= Xihu East railway station =

Railway station in Huizhou, Guangdong, China

Xihudong 西湖东
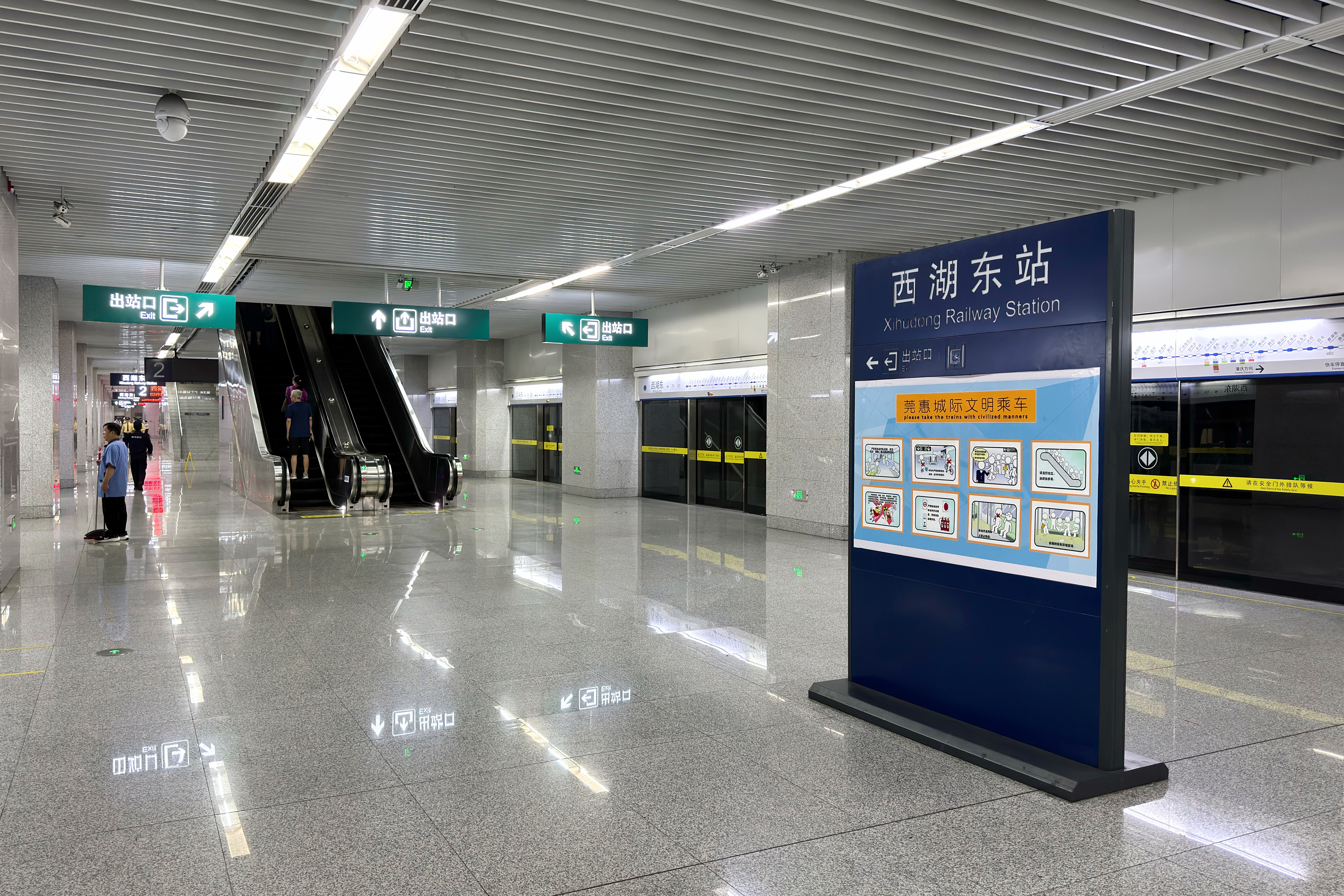
- Platform

Chinese name
- Simplified Chinese: 西湖东站
- Traditional Chinese: 西湖東站
Transcriptions
Standard Mandarin
- Hanyu Pinyin: Xīhú Dōng Zhàn
Yue: Cantonese
- Jyutping: Sai^{1}wu^{4} Dung^{1} Zaam^{6}

General information
- Location: West Huancheng Road (环城西路), Qiaoxi Subdistrict, Huicheng District, Huizhou, Guangdong; China
- Coordinates: 23°05′08″N 114°23′34″E
- Owner: Pearl River Delta Metropolitan Region intercity railway
- Operator: Guangdong Intercity Railway Operation Co., Ltd.
- Line: Guangzhou–Huizhou intercity railway
- Platforms: 2 (1 island platform)
- Tracks: 2

Construction
- Structure type: Underground
- Accessible: Yes

Other information
- Station code: WDQ (Pinyin: XHD)

History
- Opened: 30 March 2016; 10 years ago

Services
Preceding station	Pearl River Delta Metropolitan Region Intercity Railway	Following station
Longfeng towards Panyu	Guangzhou–Huizhou intercity railway	Yunshan towards Huizhou North
Location

Xihu East railway station (simplified Chinese: 西湖东站; traditional Chinese: 西湖東站; pinyin: Xīhú Dōng Zhàn; lit. 'West Lake East station') is a railway station in Huicheng District, Huizhou, Guangdong, China. It opened on 30 March 2016.

The station has 3 exits, lettered A-C, all of which are designed in the traditional Lingnan architectural style to showcase Huizhou's Dongjiang and Hakka culture. Exit C was opened when the station opened, and Exit B was opened on 23 July 2024.

== History ==
When the Dongguan–Huizhou Intercity Railway (now Guangzhou–Huizhou intercity railway) was originally planned, there was no Xihu Station. In order to facilitate tourists to visit the West Lake and facilitate the renovation of the old city, the Huizhou authorities had been striving to set up a station at the West Lake, but it was not determined until the construction of the line started. In 2010, after the Ministry of Railways intervened in the construction of the Pearl River Delta Metropolitan Region intercity railway, it redesigned the line scheme, and finally decided to add a new Xihu (West Lake) station near Lipu Fengqing, the former site of the Huizhou Municipal People's Government.

In March 2011, the construction of the West Lake section of the Dongguan-Huizhou Intercity officially started. The section of the line was originally planned to be constructed using shield tunneling, but the construction company said a year ago that "there is no need to worry about damaging the lakebed". However, due to the concern of the construction party about the risk of lake water pressure and leakage, the construction method was changed to the open-cut method, which required the pumping of lake water in the partial area. This has sparked concerns about the ecological damage to the scenic spot, which the authorities have said will be restored to its original state after completion. In April 2014, the tunnel broke through.

At the end of 2015, the station was named Xihu East.

== Usage ==
Xihu East Railway Station is located next to the West Lake Scenic Area in Huizhou, and there are large shopping malls around it with dense crowds. On 12 March 2024, the station was included in the Guanghui Intercity Express Stop Service. Within two months of the operation of the Guanghui Intercity and Guangzhao Intercity connection, the station had an average daily passenger flow of 3,351 passengers on weekdays and 7,154 passengers on weekends, both of which increased compared with before the through-running.

== Gallery ==
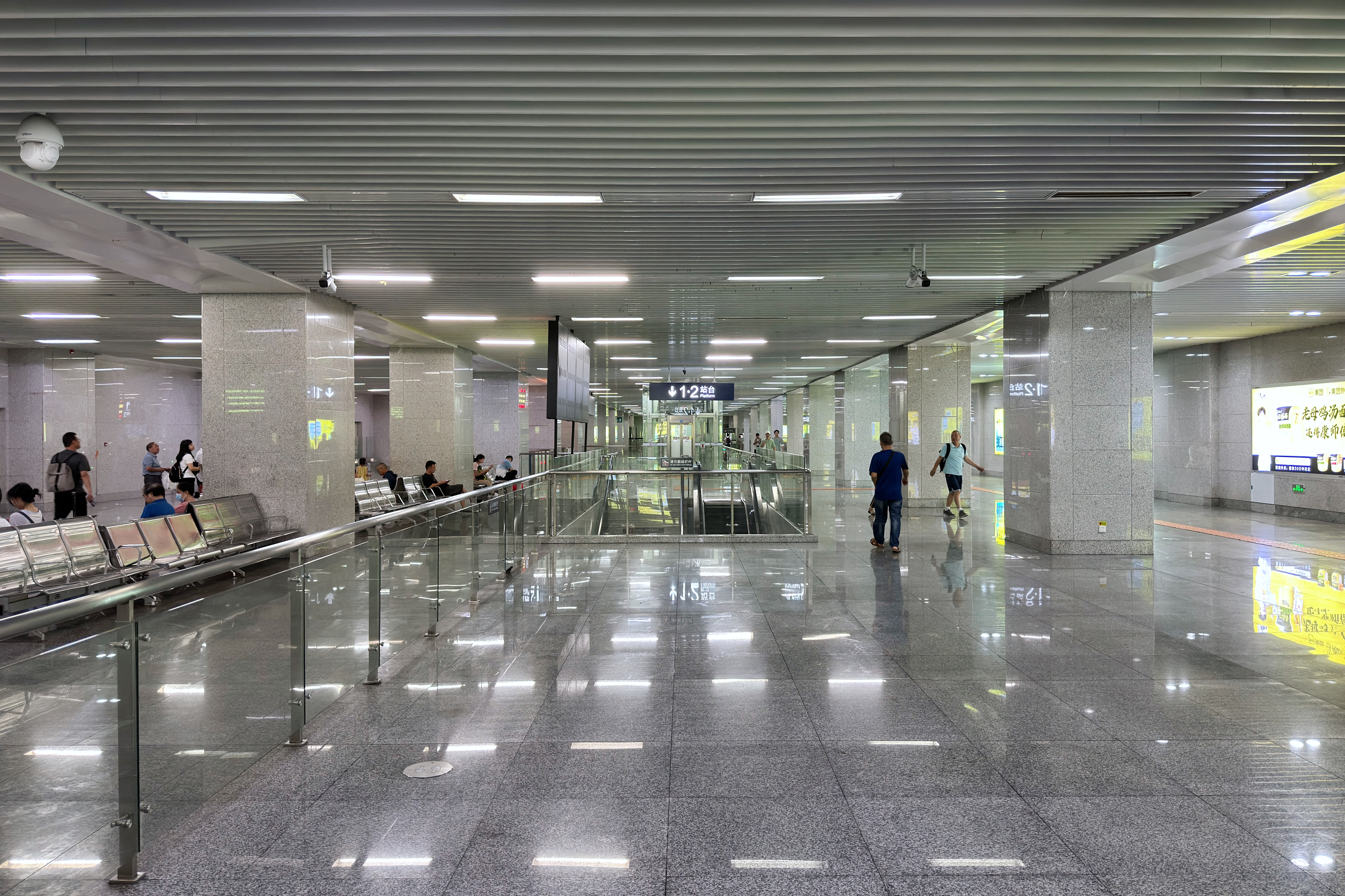
Concourse

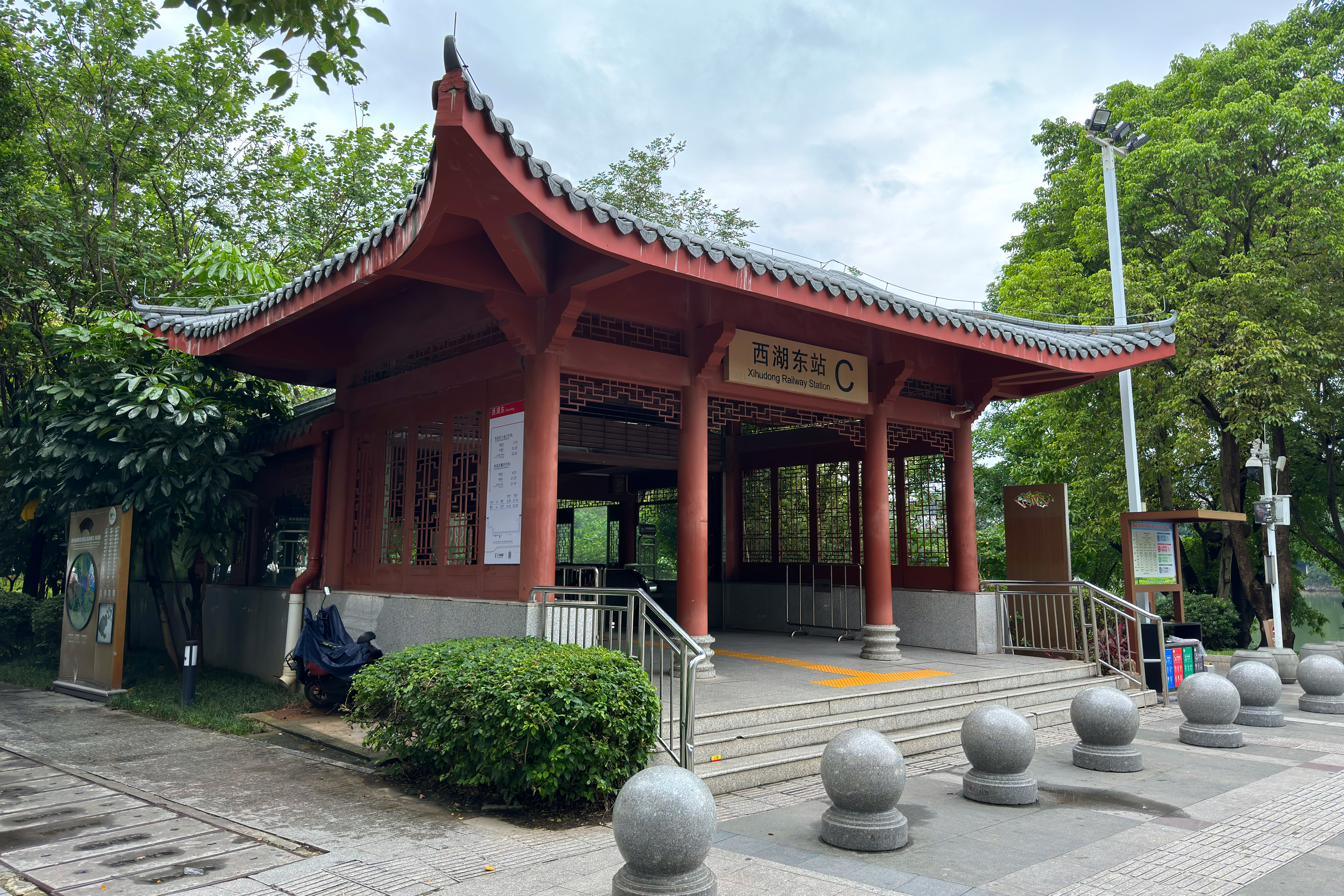
Exit C with Lingnan architectural style
