= Longfeng railway station =

Railway station in Huizhou, Guangdong, China

Longfeng 龙丰
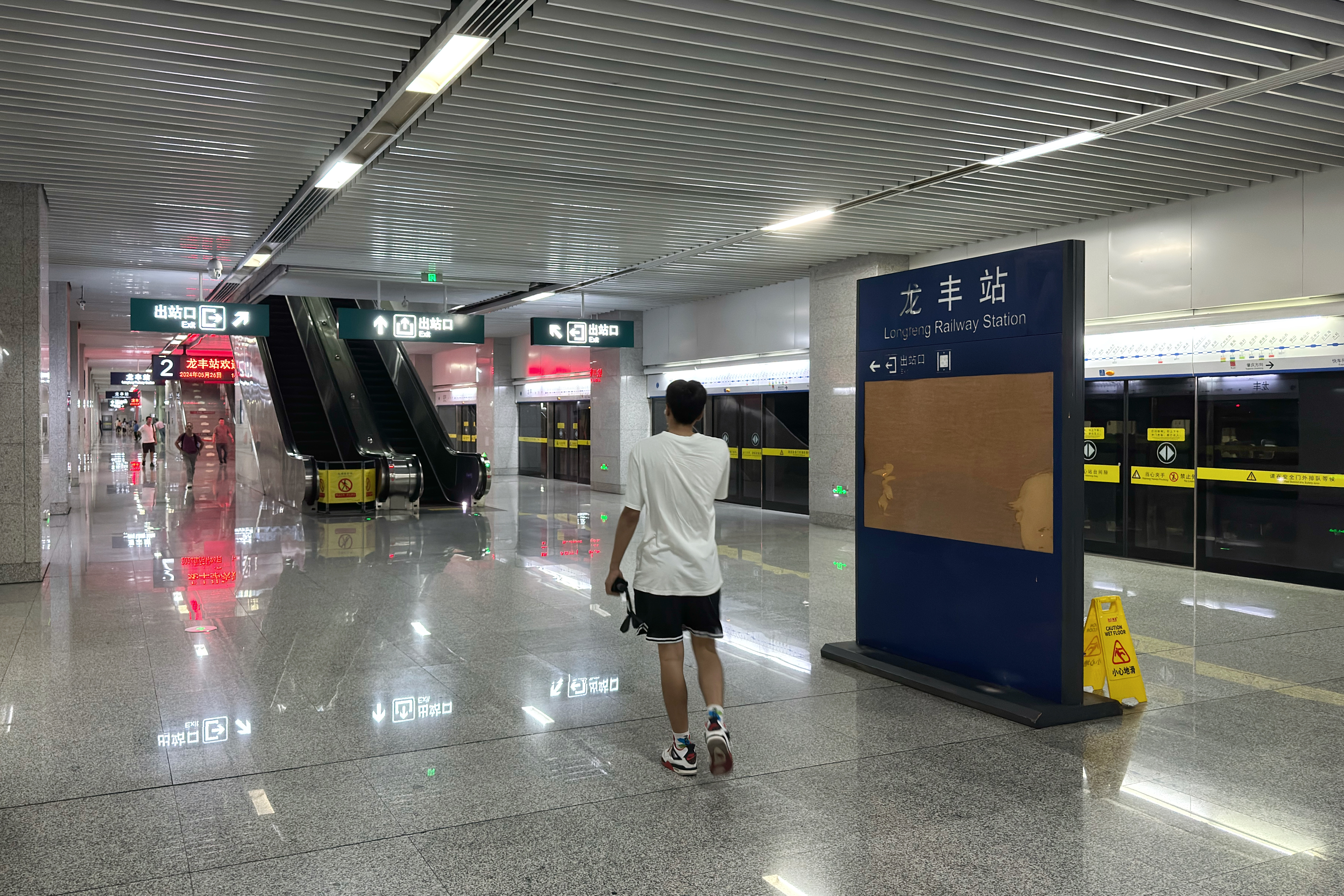
- Platform

Chinese name
- Simplified Chinese: 龙丰站
- Traditional Chinese: 龍豐站
Transcriptions
Standard Mandarin
- Hanyu Pinyin: Lóngfēng Zhàn
Yue: Cantonese
- Jyutping: Lung^{4}fung^{1} Zaam^{6}

General information
- Location: Zhongkai Boulevard (仲恺大道), Longfeng Subdistrict, Huicheng District, Huizhou, Guangdong; China
- Coordinates: 23°03′43″N 114°23′30″E
- Owner: Pearl River Delta Metropolitan Region intercity railway
- Operator: Guangdong Intercity Railway Operation Co., Ltd.
- Line: Guangzhou–Huizhou intercity railway
- Platforms: 2 (1 island platform)
- Tracks: 2

Construction
- Structure type: Underground
- Accessible: Yes

Other information
- Station code: KFQ (Pinyin: LFE)

History
- Opened: 30 March 2016; 10 years ago

Services
Preceding station	Pearl River Delta Metropolitan Region Intercity Railway	Following station
Huihuan towards Panyu	Guangzhou–Huizhou intercity railway	Xihu East towards Huizhou North
Location

Longfeng railway station (simplified Chinese: 龙丰站; traditional Chinese: 龍豐站; pinyin: Lóngfēng Zhàn) is a railway station in Huicheng District, Huizhou, Guangdong, China. It opened on 30 March 2016.

The station has 3 exits, lettered A-C. Exit C was opened when the station opened, and Exit B was opened in tandem with the Huizhou South Bus Station (Note: now known as Huizhou City Bus Station) on 21 October 2018.

== History ==
As a supporting station connecting to Huizhou South Bus Station, the station was named New South Coach Terminal in the early planning stage, and was an elevated station at that time. In 2010, after the Ministry of Railways intervened in the construction of the Pearl River Delta Metropolitan Region intercity railway, the line scheme was redesigned. Eventually, at the suggestion of the Huizhou authorities, the station was adjusted to an underground station and renamed Huizhou New South Coach Terminal.

At the end of 2015, the station was named Longfeng.
