= June 23 Huizhou bus collision incident =

2009 motor vehicle incident in China

June 23 Huizhou Shuttle Bus Collision Incident

Details
- Date: 23 June 2009; 18:31–18:38 (UTC+8)
- Country: China
- Line: Huizhou Bus Route 889
- Operator: Huizhou Chengtong Transport Co., Ltd.
- Incident type: Collision and sideswipe
- Cause: Aggressive driving by the bus driver following a dispute over substitute work arrangements during his leave.

Statistics
- Vehicles: 28
- Passengers: 0
- Deaths: 4
- Injured: 11

The June 23 Huizhou Shuttle Bus Scraping and Collision Incident, also known as the June 23 Huizhou Major Traffic Accident, refers to a series of traffic offenses that occurred on June 23, 2009, in Huicheng District, Huizhou, Guangdong Province, People’s Republic of China. The incidents included one fatal traffic offense. Between 18:31 and 18:38 that day, Li Guoqing, the driver of Route 889 operated by Huizhou Chengtong Transportation Co., Ltd., drove a Route 889 bus with the license plate “Yue L·36217” along the route’s normal operating path and collided with vehicles along the way. The incident caused 4 deaths, 11 injuries, damage to 28 motor vehicles and 2 non-motor vehicles, and economic losses of more than RMB 560,000. Huizhou police intercepted the vehicle involved at 18:38 that day and arrested the driver. Two days after the incident, at 17:00 on June 25, the driver was formally approved for arrest by the Huizhou procuratorial authorities.

== Background ==
=== Driver Involved ===
The driver involved, Li Guoqing, was male, born on April 27, 1963, and was from Laohekou, Hubei Province. He obtained his motor vehicle driver’s license on August 30, 1996, and drove buses in Hubei until 2000. In 2001, during a fight with another person, he was struck on the head with a brick, resulting in a concussion. Afterward, he was involved in a dispute with another person over borrowing a vehicle and injured the borrower with a knife.

On May 12, 2008, Li Guoqing joined Huizhou Yuntong Industrial Co., Ltd. as a driver on Route 889. On July 23 of the same year, following a change in the operating rights of Route 889, he transferred to Huizhou Chengtong Transportation Co., Ltd., and renewed his contract in May 2009. During his first contract period with Yuntong and Chengtong, he had seven traffic violation records, including four cases of speeding, one case of overloading, one case of violating a traffic prohibition sign, and one case of violating traffic signals. He also had three accident records, including two ordinary traffic accidents and one incident in which he damaged parts of a fuel dispenser. Nevertheless, Chengtong agreed to renew his contract after the first contract period expired.

Other employees of Chengtong, when interviewed by the media, said that Li was introverted, bad-tempered, had poor relationships with colleagues, and was often the subject of passenger complaints. Before the incident, he had taken 11 days of leave from Chengtong and later extended the leave by another week. He did not return to Huizhou for work until June 21, 2009. Some employees believed that something had happened in his family, which had affected him emotionally.

On June 22, 2009, Li Guoqing again requested several days of leave from the bus fleet due to physical discomfort, and the request was approved. However, at around 16:30 on the day of the incident, the fleet captain called Li and asked him to substitute for another driver. Li refused. The fleet captain later called Li again and required him to take over the shift. Li reluctantly agreed, brought all the required work documents, and went to Huizhou Railway Station Square to wait. It was not until around 18:24 that the vehicle he was supposed to drive, namely the vehicle involved in the incident, entered the station.

The dispatcher on duty said that, while waiting, Li “squatted on the ground, held his head with both hands, and remained silent.” He did not respond to greetings. The dispatcher also stated that Li’s mental state at the time did not meet the company’s conditions for allowing a driver to operate a vehicle. However, other colleagues all believed that Li was not scheduled to work that day, so they did not pay attention. After the original driver of the vehicle involved got off the bus, Li directly boarded the vehicle and drove the empty bus away. Some media reports, however, quoted the dispatcher on duty as saying that after Li Guoqing drove the vehicle about 30 meters, he asked the conductor assigned to the vehicle to get off. After the conductor got off, Li drove the empty bus out of the station.

=== Bus Route Involved ===
The bus route involved was Route 889, operated by Huizhou Chengtong Transportation Co., Ltd. It is now Route 208, operated by Huizhou Dongjiang Public Bus Transportation Co., Ltd. The route ran from Huizhou Railway Station to Tangxia Village in Xinxu. The route had previously been operated by Huizhou Yuntong Industrial Co., Ltd. On July 23, 2008, Yuntong transferred the route to the newly established Chengtong company for operation.

Before the incident, several internet users had posted on local forums complaining about the poor service quality of the route. One user commented in a reply that “a major accident is bound to happen on this route sooner or later”.

== Course of Events ==
The following table records the sequence of the incident in chronological order:

After receiving 110 emergency calls from members of the public, the Huizhou Public Security Bureau immediately deployed traffic patrol police along the route to intercept the vehicle involved. After the first accident occurred, a patrol officer attempted to intercept the vehicle by riding a police motorcycle, but was unsuccessful.

After the final accident mentioned above, Li Guoqing first got out of the bus to check the situation, then reversed the vehicle and drove away. Shortly afterward, when the bus nearly collided with a taxi at the Tianyuan Road intersection, its engine stalled. Police officers then rushed onto the bus involved in the incident and subdued Li Guoqing.

Subsequently, the police closed the relevant section of Ehu Road and reopened it at 20:30 that evening.

== Aftermath ==
Time	Location	Description
18:31	Intersection of Huizhou Avenue and Sanxin North Road	The bus collided with a silver sedan and a blue sedan. The silver sedan was pushed several hundred metres, while the blue sedan was forced into the opposite lane and struck a taxi. An agricultural vehicle also overturned. Four people were injured.
The bus sideswiped several other vehicles while continuing along the route.
18:33	Outside the Huizhou Municipal Government, Yunshan West Road	The bus collided with a minivan travelling in the same direction before sideswiping an oncoming sedan. No casualties were reported.
18:34	Outside the Jiangbei Branch of Liri Shopping Plaza	The bus struck two bicycles, both of which were almost completely crushed. Two cyclists were injured.
18:35	Northern approach to Huizhou Bridge	The bus drove into the opposite lane and collided with a black sedan. No casualties were reported.
18:36	Huizhou Bridge	The bus struck a Guangzhou-registered sedan twice. The sedan spun approximately 720 degrees, mounted the sidewalk, and damaged the bridge railing. No one was injured.
18:37	Xiajiao South Road / Ehu Road	The bus collided with a sedan waiting at a traffic light, causing secondary collisions with another sedan and a bicycle. It then struck an oncoming van. Five people were injured, including the cyclist and a pregnant woman.
18:37	Near the PLA Unit 75200	The bus collided with two oncoming sedans and a truck, leaving the three vehicles wedged together. No casualties were reported.
18:38	Intersection of Ehu Road and Chengqu Government Road	The bus drove into the opposite lane and collided with taxi "粤L·A8480". The taxi was then rear-ended by a truck and crushed between a sedan and two trucks. Four occupants of the taxi, including the driver, died at the scene.

=== Official Response ===
After the incident, Huang Yebin, secretary of the Huizhou Municipal Committee of the Chinese Communist Party, and Li Ruqiu, mayor of the Huizhou Municipal People’s Government, issued instructions. Li Dawen, a member of the Standing Committee of the CCP Huizhou Municipal Committee, secretary of the Political and Legal Affairs Commission of the CCP Huizhou Municipal Committee, and director of the Huizhou Public Security Bureau, together with Lin Tianhao, vice mayor of the Huizhou Municipal People’s Government, quickly organized and directed the rescue of the injured and the management of traffic. They immediately convened leaders from the Huizhou Public Security Bureau, the municipal transportation bureau, the CCP Huicheng District Committee of Huizhou, and the Huicheng District People’s Government to study and arrange follow-up handling and investigation work. A press conference was also held to brief the public on the incident. After the press conference, Li Dawen and Lin Tianhao visited the injured in hospital on behalf of the CCP Huizhou Municipal Committee and the Huizhou Municipal Government.

Liang Weifa, a member of the Standing Committee of the CCP Guangdong Provincial Committee, secretary of the Political and Legal Affairs Commission of the CCP Guangdong Provincial Committee, and director of the Guangdong Provincial Public Security Department, as well as Luo Juan, executive deputy director of the department, successively issued instructions. They required the public security authorities to ascertain the basic facts of the case as soon as possible, work with relevant departments to properly handle follow-up matters, and promptly release information to the public. Later, Deng Zhengyu, deputy director of the Traffic Management Bureau of the Guangdong Provincial Public Security Department, and Ou Guisheng, a criminal investigation expert from the Criminal Investigation Bureau, led a team to Huizhou overnight to guide the investigation.

On the day after the incident, the Traffic Police Detachment of the Huizhou Public Security Bureau deployed a large number of additional officers to major intersections along the affected road section. Several traffic assistants were also assigned to smaller intersections along the route to help direct traffic.

== News Releases ==
=== First and Second Press Conferences ===
At 22:00 on the night of the incident, the Huizhou Public Security Bureau held its first press conference, where it reported the basic facts of the incident. The press conference was chaired by the bureau’s deputy director in charge of the Traffic Police Detachment.

At 15:00 on June 24, the day after the incident, the Huizhou Public Security Bureau held its second press conference. The conference was chaired by Cai Rongyang, the bureau’s deputy director in charge of the Criminal Police Detachment. It reported the preliminary investigation results and explained several points of controversy. According to the briefing, the driver involved, Li Guoqing, had been on sick leave when he was asked by the fleet captain to return to work and substitute for another driver. After collecting all the required work documents, Li waited at Huizhou Railway Station Square for more than an hour. The longer he waited, the angrier he became. At around 18:24, the vehicle involved finally entered the station. After the vehicle arrived, Li, in a state of rage, directly drove it away, proceeded along the normal operating route of Route 889, and caused the incident.

Earlier media reports had quoted witnesses as saying that the incident occurred because the driver had received a phone call saying that his daughter had been killed by her husband, and that he lost control because he was anxious to return home. In response, Cai Rongyang stated that this claim was false. He said that the driver had two daughters, one working in his hometown in Hubei and the other living in Huizhou, and that the police had already contacted both of them. In addition, the police conducted a blood test on the driver and ruled out drunk driving. The Huizhou Public Security Bureau was also carrying out the judicial procedure for a psychiatric evaluation of the driver. Regarding inconsistent media reports about the number of deaths, Cai Rongyang stated that the number of deaths in the incident had been confirmed as four, all of whom were occupants of the taxi struck in the final accident.

=== Third Press Conference ===
At 17:30 on June 25, 2009, the Huizhou Public Security Bureau held its third press conference. The conference was again chaired by Cai Rongyang, the bureau’s deputy director in charge of the Criminal Police Detachment. It reported that the driver involved, Li Guoqing, was suspected of committing the crime of endangering public security by dangerous means and had been formally approved for arrest at 17:00 that afternoon. It also stated that the Route 889 bus involved, with the license plate “Yue L·36217,” was functioning normally in all respects. In addition, the bureau provided explanations on further points of controversy surrounding the incident.

Regarding earlier media reports claiming that “the driver drove passengers off the bus after the first accident occurred” Zheng Zefeng, another deputy director of the Huizhou Public Security Bureau, said that this claim was “only a speculation.” He also stated that, after investigation, the bureau had confirmed that the driver was the only person on the bus from beginning to end. As for whether the woman struck near Huizhou Bridge had died, Zheng said that the woman had been sent to hospital for treatment after being knocked down. She was the most seriously injured among all the injured persons in the incident, but her life was not in danger, contrary to online claims that she had been “killed”.

In addition, in response to public questioning of the Huizhou Public Security Bureau’s use of the term “collision and scraping” to describe the incident, Zheng Zefeng said that the term included both “collision” and “scraping.” Since the bus involved collided with 16 motor vehicles and scraped against 12 motor vehicles, the term was used to describe the incident. He also said that the term complied with the Road Traffic Safety Law of the People’s Republic of China. Regarding earlier media reports claiming that Chengtong had “not been registered,” meaning that it had no road passenger transport operating qualifications, Chen Zhenxiang, deputy director of the Huizhou Transportation Bureau, stated that the company had been established in July 2008 and held a road transport operating permit. In addition, relevant departments also responded at the press conference to public doubts about the transparency of the government’s handling of the incident.

== Casualties ==
The accident caused a total of 4 deaths and 11 injuries. The four deceased were Peng Xinfa, a Huizhou-born driver of the taxi with the license plate “Yue L·A8480,” and three passengers from Taihe, Anhui: Zhao Liang, Ma Yingbiao, and Ma Congjin. The latter two were uncle and nephew. The families of the deceased were deeply grief-stricken when identifying the bodies at the funeral home. The Huizhou Transportation Bureau also established an accident follow-up handling team to comfort the families of the deceased.

Huizhou Huikang Hospital, Huizhou Hospital of Traditional Chinese Medicine, and the 173rd Hospital of the Chinese People’s Liberation Army treated all the injured persons from the accident. Their conditions were generally stable, with three requiring hospitalization. Some of the injured were frightened after the accident, appeared mentally dazed, and needed psychological treatment. Several others suffered skin abrasions or soft-tissue contusions. The most seriously injured person had meningeal bleeding and multiple fractures of varying degrees in several parts of the body, and also had two front teeth knocked out.

== Trial ==
On August 7, 2009, the Huizhou Intermediate People’s Court publicly heard the case of Li Guoqing, the driver involved, who was suspected of committing the crime of endangering public security by dangerous means. The Huizhou Municipal People’s Procuratorate described the entire course of the incident in its charges. Li Guoqing denied all charges brought by the procuratorial authority and responded to each piece of evidence by saying, “I don’t know anything!” He claimed that his “brain was out of control at the time”.

The prosecution and Li Guoqing’s defense lawyer also argued over Li’s mental state at the time of the incident. The prosecution provided testimony from Li’s family members about his personality, certification from the public security authorities in Laohekou regarding Li’s previous act of injuring another person with a knife, and testimony from Chengtong employees about Li’s usual work condition and his state before the incident. The prosecution argued that these testimonies proved that Li’s mental state was normal. The defense, however, argued that Li’s behavior of “squatting beside a flower bed, holding his head and saying nothing, then getting on the vehicle, starting it, and driving away” proved that his mental state was abnormal at the time. This argument was rejected by the prosecution. The two sides later debated whether certain driving behaviors by Li during the incident could prove that his mental state was normal. Afterward, the defense requested that relevant authorities conduct a judicial psychiatric evaluation of Li Guoqing. The court stated that it would study the matter during collegiate panel deliberation and announce the verdict at a later date.

On August 24, the Huizhou Public Security Bureau commissioned the Guangdong Mental Health Institute to conduct a judicial evaluation of Li Guoqing’s mental state at the time of the incident. On September 6 and October 10, the Guangdong Mental Health Institute conducted two psychiatric examinations of Li Guoqing. On November 27, the institute issued its evaluation result, stating that although Li had a history of head trauma and abnormal speech and behavior, there was insufficient evidence to prove that he had a mental disorder at the time of the crime. In December, Li Guoqing again applied for a judicial evaluation [19], but the request was not accepted by the Huizhou Intermediate People’s Court.

On December 10, the Huizhou Intermediate People’s Court held a second hearing of the case. On December 30, the court delivered its first-instance judgment, finding Li Guoqing guilty of endangering public security by dangerous means and sentencing him to death with deprivation of political rights for life. Li Guoqing stated in court that he would appeal. His wife, Huang Wenjie, also told the media, “I guarantee with my life that my husband really is ill”.

On March 15, 2010, the Guangdong Higher People’s Court accepted Li Guoqing’s appeal for filing. Later, the court issued a criminal ruling rejecting the appeal and upholding the original judgment, and submitted the death sentence to the Supreme People’s Court of the People’s Republic of China for approval. After the Supreme People’s Court approved the relevant criminal ruling of the Guangdong Higher People’s Court, the Huizhou Intermediate People’s Court held a public sentencing announcement meeting on January 12, 2012. It publicly announced three cases, including Li Guoqing’s case, and served the criminal ruling of the Supreme People’s Court. Li Guoqing was then executed.

== Impact ==
=== Impact on the Route Involved ===
On the evening of June 23, 2009, the Huizhou Transportation Management General Station issued a rectification order to Huizhou Chengtong Transportation Co., Ltd. It later dispatched a working group to Chengtong to investigate the thoughts of cadres and employees and to determine whether there were loopholes in the company’s management. From the morning of the next day, Route 889 suspended service, and the depot gate remained closed. An employee told the media that the route might be permanently discontinued. Since the route was the only bus route connecting Huizhou urban area and Xinxu Town, Chen Zhenxiang, deputy director of the Huizhou Transportation Bureau, stated at the third press conference that the bureau was also considering adjusting other bus routes to ensure travel for affected residents.

On August 28, Route 889 was renamed Route 699 and resumed operation. However, it no longer used Huizhou Bridge, instead switching to Hesheng Bridge. In addition, except for the vehicle involved in the incident, all vehicles formerly assigned to Route 889 were put into operation on Route 699. Each vehicle was equipped with four cameras

=== Mental Health Issues ===
The incident also drew public attention to the mental health of workers in the passenger transport industry. On June 25, 2009, the New Express published a commentary stating that the handling of such public safety incidents should not only emphasize regulating the behavior of relevant personnel, but should also pay attention to building an environment that helps people maintain psychological health. In addition, Cai Songhua, a counselor at the Huizhou Anying Psychological Counseling Center, believed that the driver involved had an aggressive personality tendency and felt dissatisfaction toward society.

From June 30 to July 1, relevant departments in Huizhou convened more than 20 road passenger transport operators, including Chengtong, which was involved in the incident, to conduct large-scale psychological crisis intervention for workers in the passenger transport industry. During the intervention, counselors conducted questionnaire surveys among Chengtong drivers who participated. Preliminary results showed that the psychological pressure on the company’s drivers mainly came from work pressure and interpersonal pressure. The Dongjiang Times also conducted a random survey of bus and shuttle bus drivers in Huizhou urban area. The results showed that 86% of drivers said their companies had never arranged psychological counseling.

=== Impact on the Passenger Transport Industry ===
On July 14, the Huizhou Transportation Bureau launched a citywide rectification campaign for the road passenger transport industry and established a special working group to take charge of it. The campaign lasted two months. It focused on Huicheng District and covered various road passenger transport businesses, including road passenger transport, taxi passenger transport, public bus transport, and road passenger transport stations.

In addition, some internet users suggested that public transport operators should pay attention to the mental health development of workers in the passenger transport industry and improve employee treatment. After the rectification campaign began, some operators had already changed their wage model from “basic salary plus commission” to a “two-shift work system plus hourly wages.” They also paid overtime wages to drivers who worked overtime, while discouraging drivers from working extra shifts or substituting for others. Because this measure significantly increased drivers’ average monthly wages, it was welcomed by drivers.
