= Huihuan railway station =

Railway station in Huizhou, Guangdong, China

Huihuan 惠环
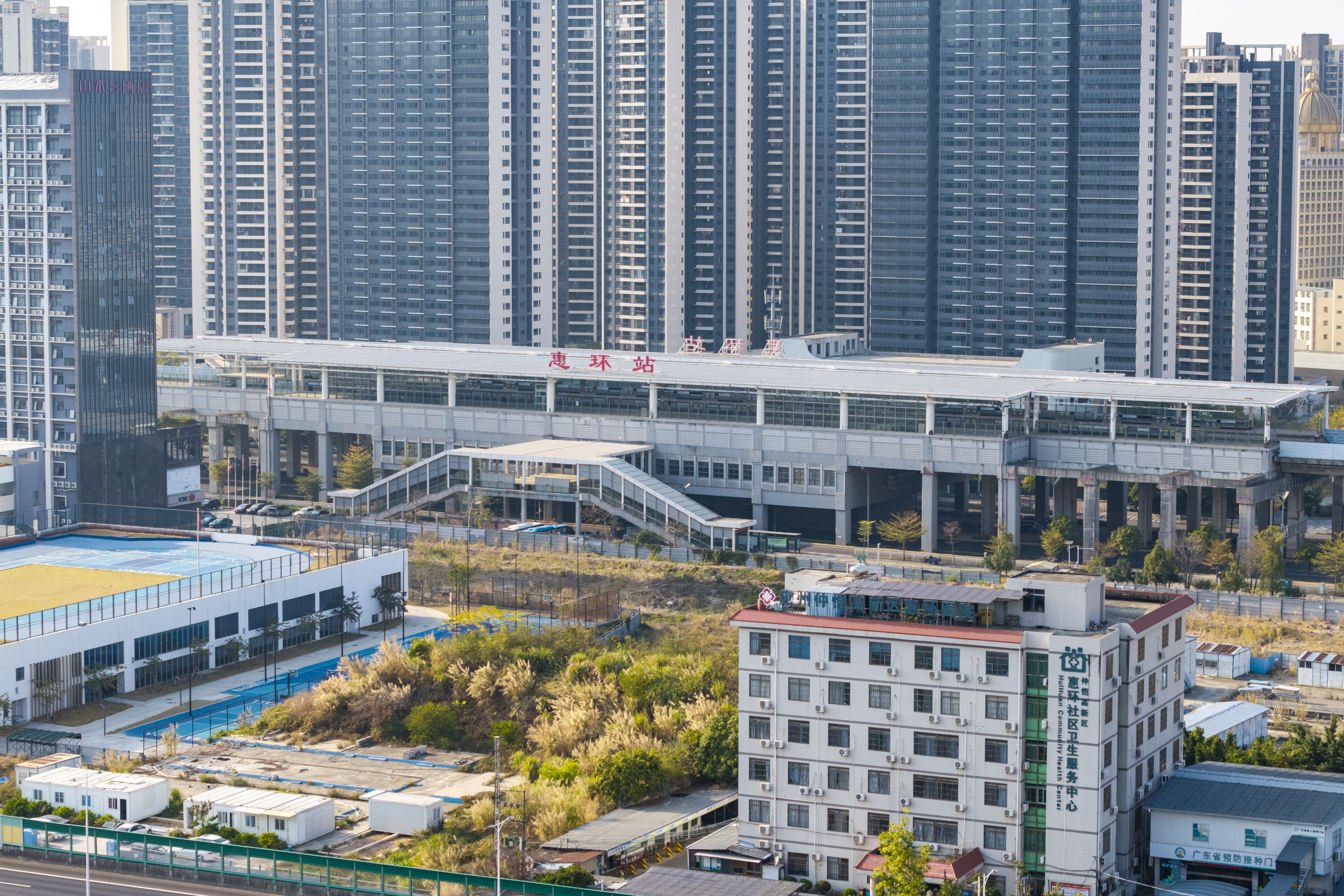
- Exterior

Chinese name
- Simplified Chinese: 惠环站
- Traditional Chinese: 惠環站
Transcriptions
Standard Mandarin
- Hanyu Pinyin: Huìhuán Zhàn
Yue: Cantonese
- Jyutping: Wai^{6}waan^{4} Zaam^{6}

General information
- Location: Zhongkai Boulevard (仲恺大道), Huihuan Subdistrict, Huicheng District, Huizhou, Guangdong; China
- Coordinates: 23°02′12″N 114°21′48″E
- Owner: Pearl River Delta Metropolitan Region intercity railway
- Operator: Guangdong Intercity Railway Operation Co., Ltd.
- Line: Guangzhou–Huizhou intercity railway
- Platforms: 2 (2 side platforms)
- Tracks: 4

Construction
- Structure type: Elevated
- Accessible: Yes

Other information
- Station code: KHQ (Pinyin: HHU)

History
- Opened: 30 March 2016; 10 years ago

Services
Preceding station	Pearl River Delta Metropolitan Region Intercity Railway	Following station
Chenjiang South towards Panyu	Guangzhou–Huizhou intercity railway	Longfeng towards Huizhou North
Location

Huihuan railway station (simplified Chinese: 惠环站; traditional Chinese: 惠環站; pinyin: Huìhuán Zhàn) is a railway station in Huicheng District, Huizhou, Guangdong, China. It opened on 30 March 2016. It is located above Zhongkai Boulevard.

== History ==
The station has an elevated double-island platform during the planning and construction stage. In 2010, after the Ministry of Railways intervened in the construction of the Pearl River Delta Metropolitan Region intercity railway, the line scheme was redesigned. The station was adjusted to a side-platform layout, and the location was also shifted.
