= Yunshan railway station =

Railway station in Huizhou, Guangdong, China

Yunshan 云山
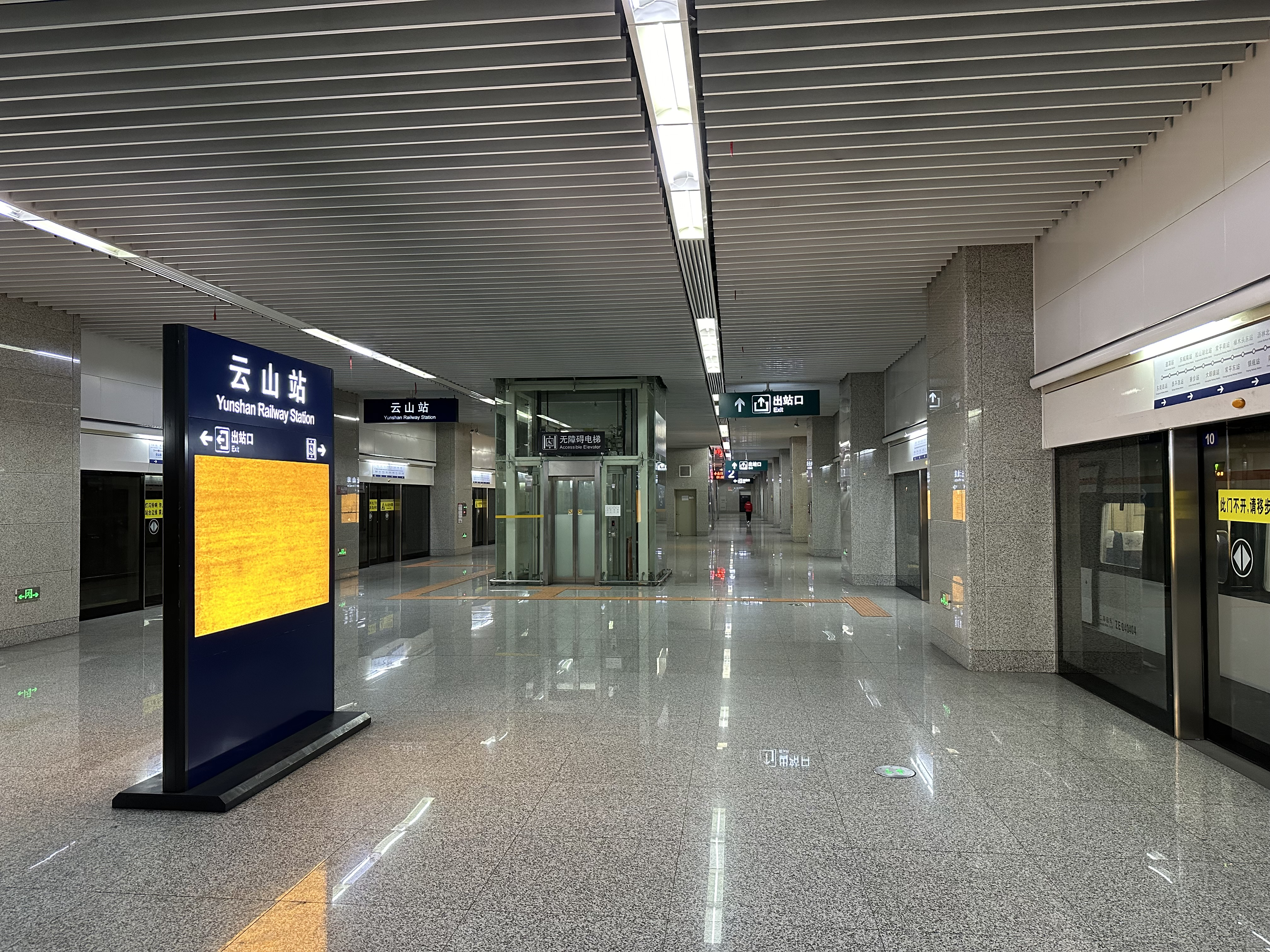
- Platform

Chinese name
- Simplified Chinese: 云山站
- Traditional Chinese: 雲山站
Transcriptions
Standard Mandarin
- Hanyu Pinyin: Yúnshān Zhàn
Yue: Cantonese
- Jyutping: Wan^{4}saan^{1} Zaam^{6}

General information
- Location: No. 2 West Yunshan Road (云山西路2号), Jiangbei Subdistrict, Huicheng District, Huizhou, Guangdong; China
- Coordinates: 23°06′32″N 114°24′43″E
- Owner: Pearl River Delta Metropolitan Region intercity railway
- Operator: Guangdong Intercity Railway Operation Co., Ltd.
- Line: Guangzhou–Huizhou intercity railway
- Platforms: 2 (1 island platform)
- Tracks: 2

Construction
- Structure type: Underground
- Accessible: Yes

Other information
- Station code: KZQ (Pinyin: YSH)

History
- Opened: 30 March 2016; 10 years ago

Services
Preceding station	Pearl River Delta Metropolitan Region Intercity Railway	Following station
Xihu East towards Panyu	Guangzhou–Huizhou intercity railway	Xiaojinkou towards Huizhou North
Location

Yunshan railway station (simplified Chinese: 云山站; traditional Chinese: 雲山站; pinyin: Yúnshān Zhàn) is a railway station in Huicheng District, Huizhou, Guangdong, China. It opened on 30 March 2016.

The station has 4 exits, lettered A, B, C1 and C2. When the station opened, only Exits C1 and C2 are used.

== History ==
In the early planning stage, the station was named Huizhou Dadao (Boulevard) Station, which was the near-term terminus of the Dongguan-Huizhou Intercity Railway (now Guangzhou–Huizhou intercity railway) and was located on Huizhou Boulevard.

In 2010, after the Ministry of Railways intervened in the construction of the Pearl River Delta Metropolitan Region intercity railway, the line scheme was redesigned. Eventually, at the suggestion of the Huizhou authorities, the station was adjusted to West Yunshan Road, which is closer to the administrative center of Huizhou, and renamed West Yunshan Road. Because the station is close to the Huizhou Municipal People's Government, the station is also known as the Municipal Government Station.

At the end of 2015, the station was named Yunshan.

== Usage ==
Yunshan Station is located in the core area of Huizhou Jiangbei CBD, with dense traffic. The station has an average daily passenger flow of about 2,000 passengers, including 3,000 passengers on weekends and holidays. On 1 July 2024, the station was included in the Guanghui Intercity Express Stop Service.

== Gallery ==
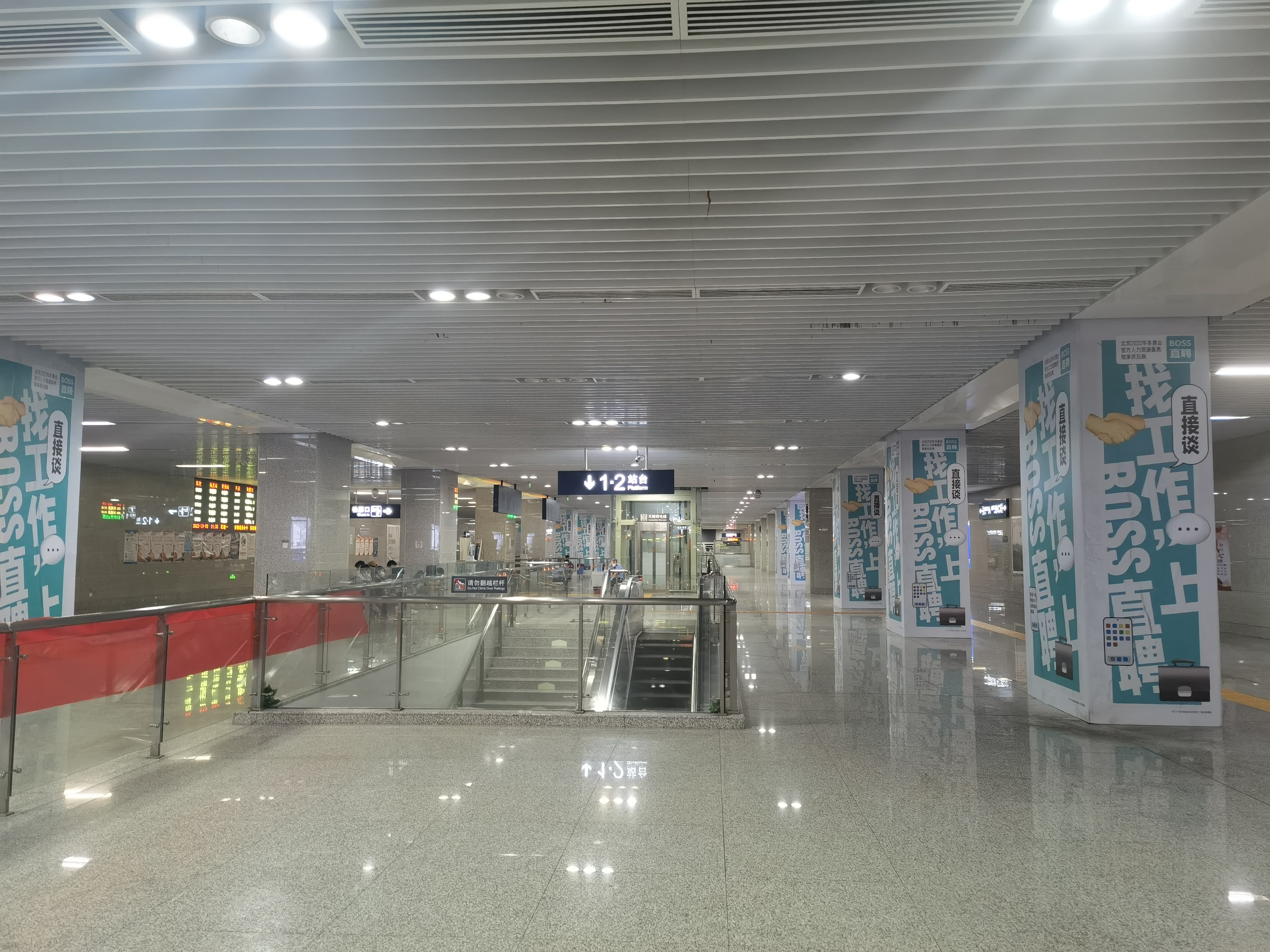
Concourse

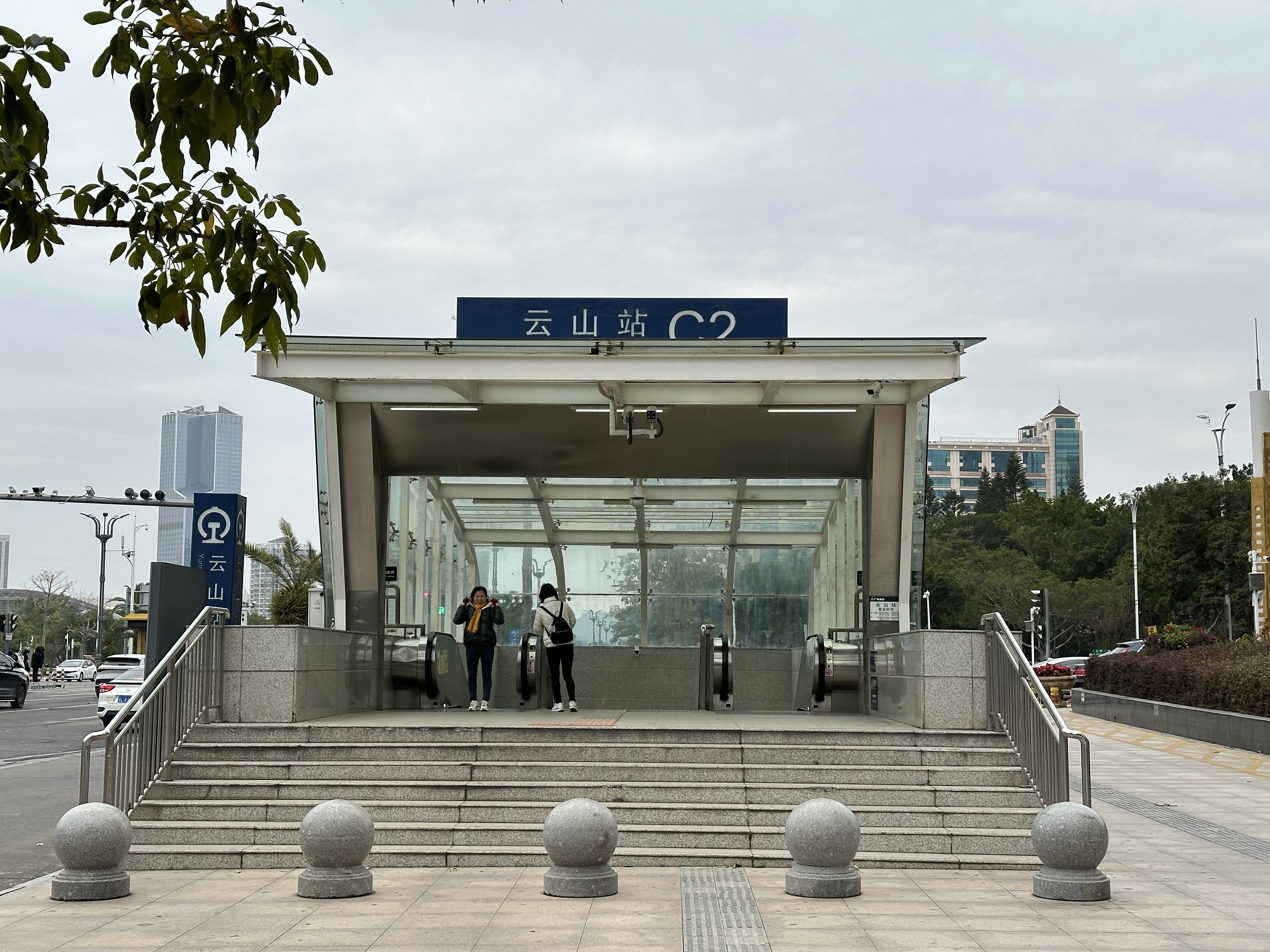
Exit C2
