= Xiaojinkou railway station =

Intercity railway station in Huizhou, Guangdong, China

Xiaojinkou 小金口
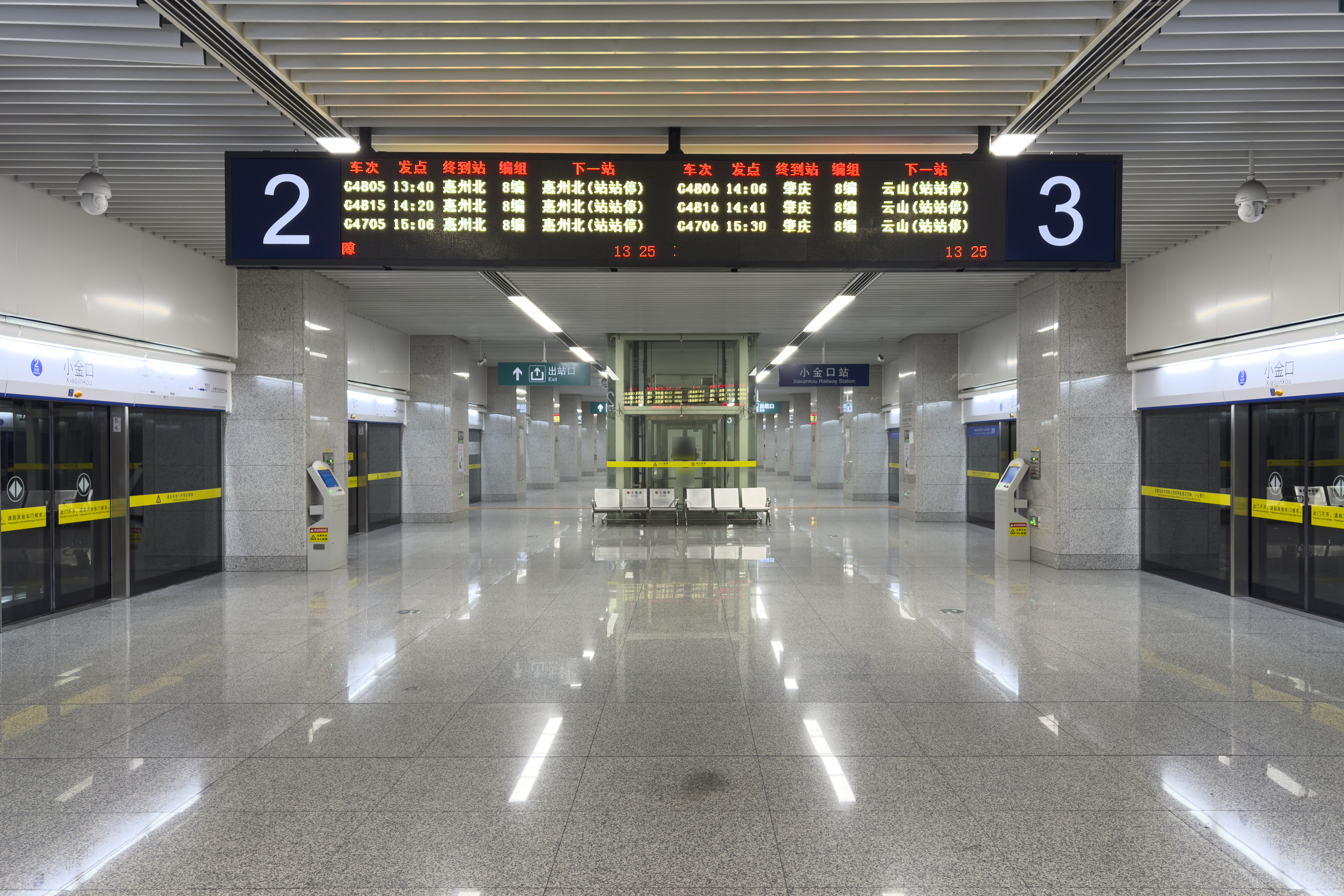
- Platform 2&3

Chinese name
- Chinese: 小金口站
Transcriptions
Standard Mandarin
- Hanyu Pinyin: Xiǎojīnkǒu Zhàn
Yue: Cantonese
- Yale Romanization: Síugāmháu Jaahm
- Jyutping: Siu^{2}gam^{1}hau^{2} Zaam^{6}

General information
- Location: Xiaojinkou Subdistrict, Huicheng District, Huizhou, Guangdong; China
- Coordinates: 23°9′12.57″N 114°24′47.37″E
- Owner: Pearl River Delta Metropolitan Region intercity railway
- Operator: Guangdong Intercity Railway Operation Co., Ltd.
- Line: Guangzhou–Huizhou intercity railway
- Platforms: 4 (1 island platform and 2 side platforms)
- Tracks: 4
- Connections: Huizhou railway station

Construction
- Structure type: Underground
- Accessible: Yes

Other information
- Station code: NKQ (Pinyin: XJK)

History
- Opened: 30 March 2016; 10 years ago

Services
Preceding station	Pearl River Delta Metropolitan Region Intercity Railway	Following station
Yunshan towards Panyu	Guangzhou–Huizhou intercity railway	Huizhou North Terminus
Location

Xiaojinkou railway station (Chinese: 小金口站; pinyin: Xiǎojīnkǒu Zhàn) is a railway station in Huicheng District, Huizhou, Guangdong, China. It opened on 30 March 2016. The station is located on Huizhou Avenue, and has an island and two side platforms. The station was the eastern terminus of the Guangzhou–Huizhou intercity railway until the section to Huizhou North railway station opened on 29 September 2025.

The station has 4 points of entry/exit, lettered A-D. Exit D was used in the past when the station first opened, but was later changed to only use Exit C. On 2 July 2025, Exit B was reopened.

== History ==
As a supporting station connecting to Huizhou North railway station (Note: Now known as Huizhou Railway Station. From 1990 to 2003, the station was known as Huizhou North Railway Station), this station was named North Coach Terminal in the early planning stage, but at that time, it was only reserved for the long term and was planned as an elevated station. After the construction of the Huizhou Boulevard section of the Dongguan–Huizhou Intercity Railway (now Guangzhou–Huizhou intercity railway) started in 2009, the Huizhou Municipal Government continued to strive to adjust the line underground in order to avoid the elevated line cutting the city and the construction of the elevated line affecting urban traffic.

In 2010, after the Ministry of Railways intervened in the construction of the Pearl River Delta Metropolitan Region intercity railway, the line scheme was redesigned, and the line through Huizhou Boulevard was changed to underground, and the station was also changed to a non-reserved underground station and named Huizhou North Coach Terminal.

At the end of 2015, the station was named Xiaojinkou. On 30 March 2016, the station opened along with the line between this station and Changping East. The station was operated by China Railway Guangzhou Group when it was opened, and was transferred to Guangdong Intercity on 23 January 2024.

== Gallery ==
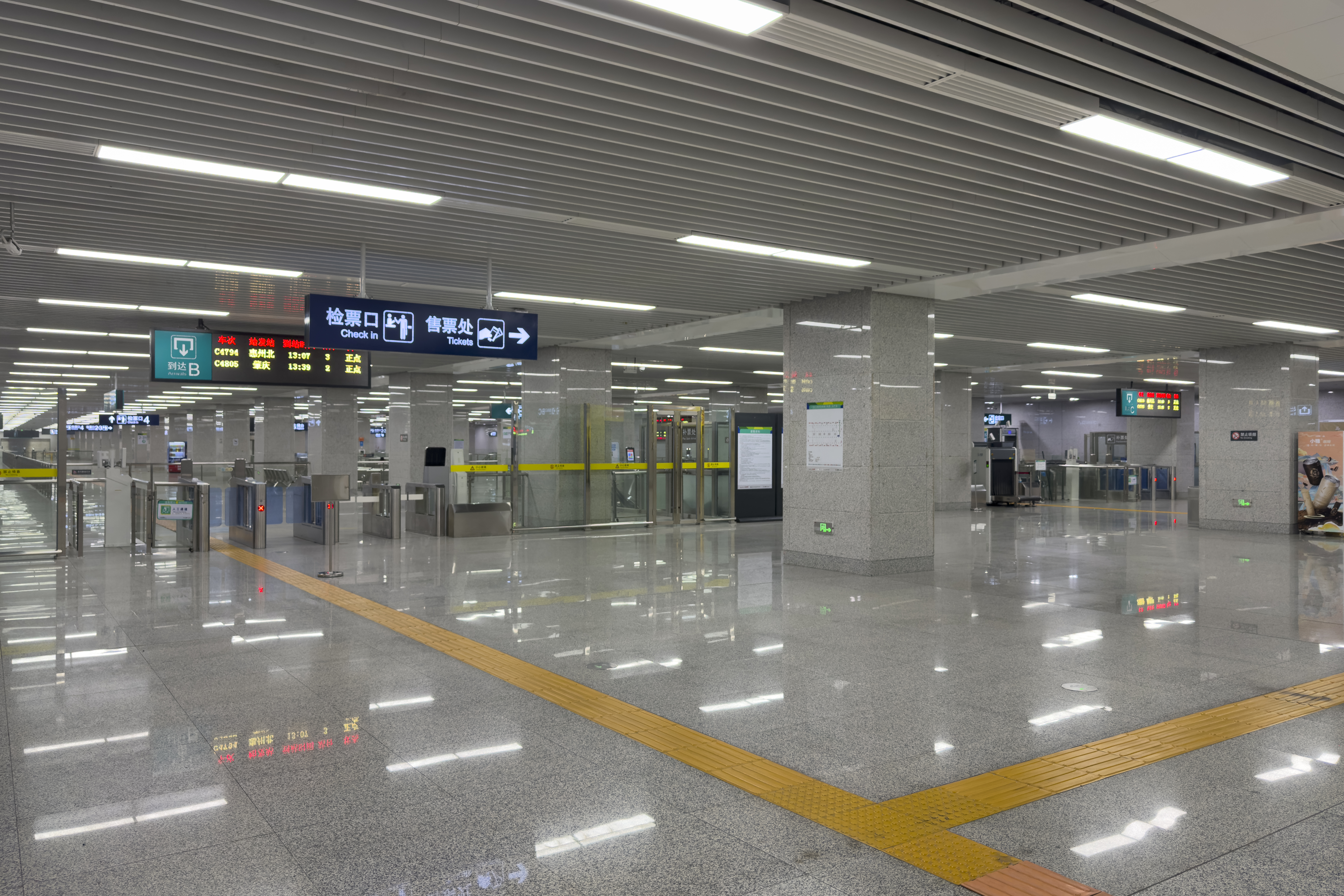
Concourse

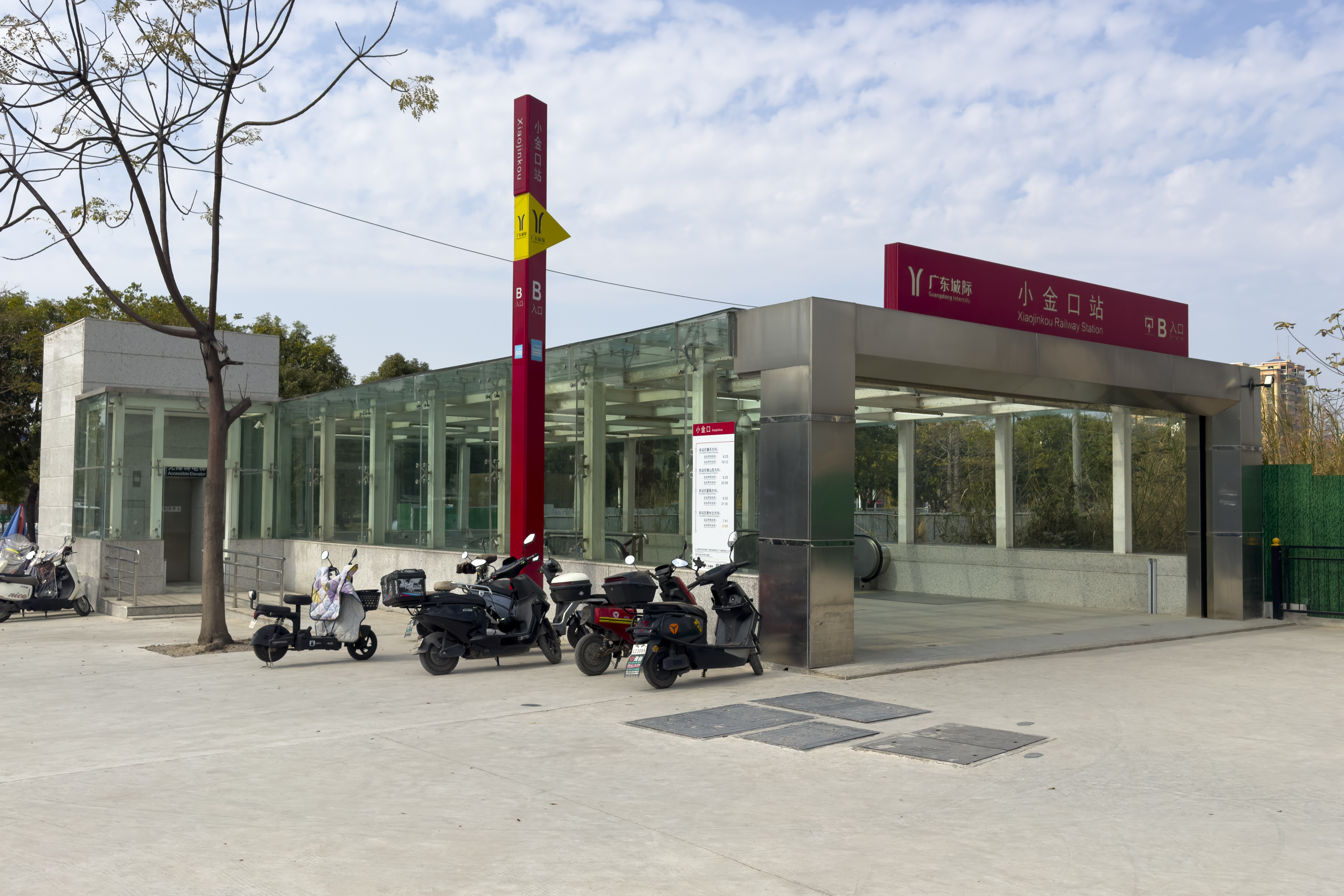
Exit B
