= Chenjiang South railway station =

Railway station in Huizhou, Guangdong, China

Chenjiangnan 陈江南
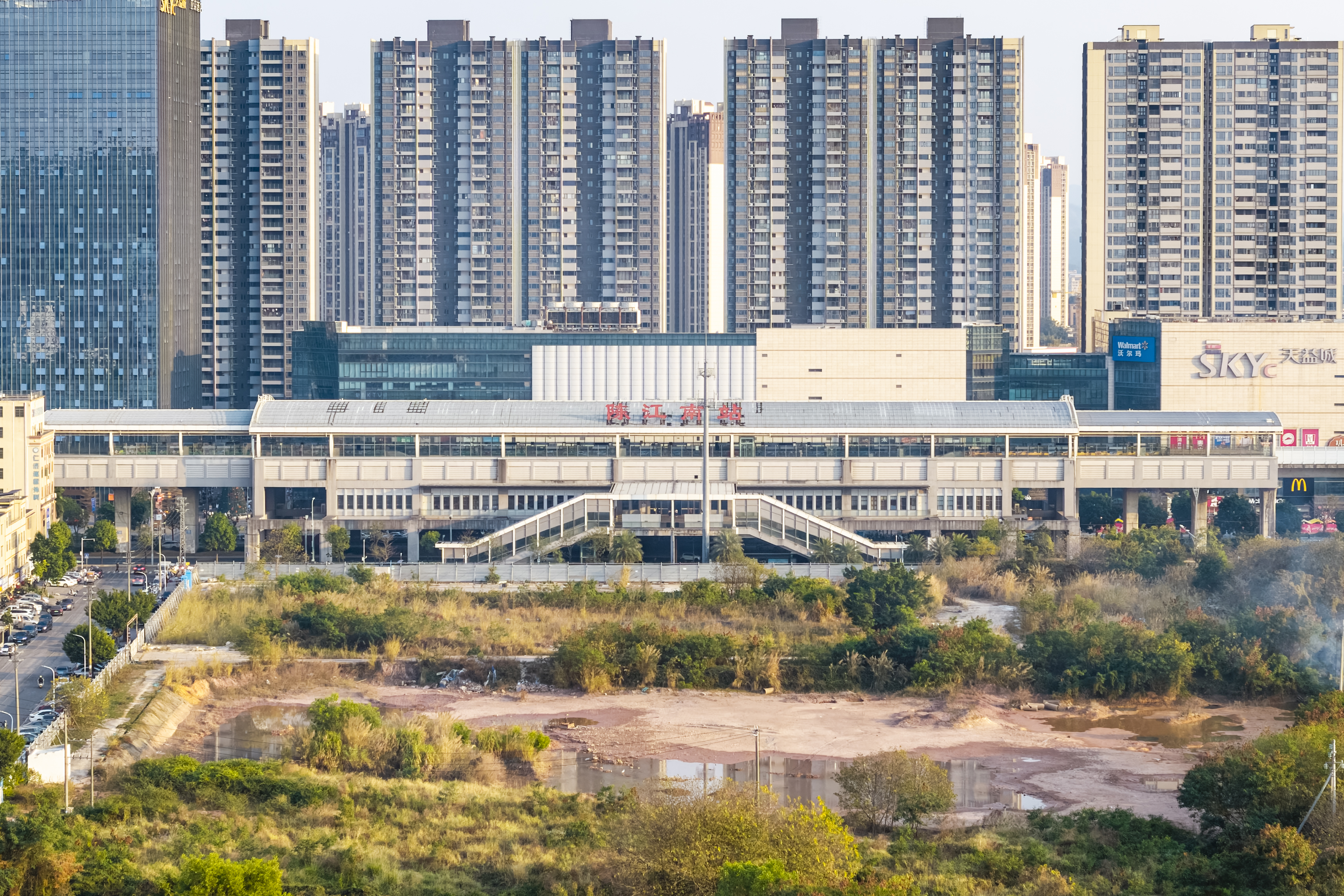
- Exterior

Chinese name
- Simplified Chinese: 陈江南站
- Traditional Chinese: 陳江南站
Transcriptions
Standard Mandarin
- Hanyu Pinyin: Chénjiāng Nán Zhàn
Yue: Cantonese
- Jyutping: Can^{4}gong^{1} Naam^{4} Zaam^{6}

General information
- Location: Zhongkai Boulevard (仲恺大道), HZZK Hi-tech Industrial Development Zone, Huizhou, Guangdong; China
- Coordinates: 23°00′31″N 114°19′19″E
- Owner: Pearl River Delta Metropolitan Region intercity railway
- Operator: Guangdong Intercity Railway Operation Co., Ltd.
- Line: Guangzhou–Huizhou intercity railway
- Platforms: 2 (2 side platforms)
- Tracks: 2

Construction
- Structure type: Elevated
- Accessible: Yes

Other information
- Station code: KKQ (Pinyin: CJN)

History
- Opened: 30 March 2016; 10 years ago
- Former names: Zhongkai (仲恺) (2016-2021)

Services
Preceding station	Pearl River Delta Metropolitan Region Intercity Railway	Following station
Lilin North towards Panyu	Guangzhou–Huizhou intercity railway	Huihuan towards Huizhou North
Location

Chenjiang South railway station (simplified Chinese: 陈江南站; traditional Chinese: 陳江南站; pinyin: Chénjiāng Nán Zhàn; Jyutping: Can^{4}gong^{1} Naam^{4} Zaam^{6}) is a railway station within the Huizhou Zhongkai Hi-tech Industrial Development Zone in Huizhou, Guangdong, China. It opened on 30 March 2016.

== History ==
The station is named Chenjiang during the planning and construction stage, and was located near Chenjiang Boulevard in the early planning stage. In 2010, after the Ministry of Railways intervened in the construction of the Pearl River Delta Metropolitan Region intercity railway, the line scheme was redesigned. Eventually, at the suggestion of the Huizhou authorities, in order to avoid cutting the urban planning, the station was adjusted to the southeast to the current site of Zhongkai Boulevard.

At the end of 2015, the station was named Zhongkai. It opened on 30 March 2016.

On 25 April 2021, the Huizhou Port, Aviation and Railway Affairs Center announced the "Plan for Naming and Naming Some Rail Stations in Huizhou", planning to rename the station to Chenjiang South to prevent the same name as the station under construction on the Ganzhou–Shenzhen high-speed railway. On September 30 of the same year, the station was renamed.

== Usage ==
The station is located in the core area of Chenjiang (Zhongkai) business district, with dense crowds. It has the second largest passenger flow on the Guangzhou-Huizhou intercity Guanhui section and the largest flow on the Huizhou section.

== Gallery ==
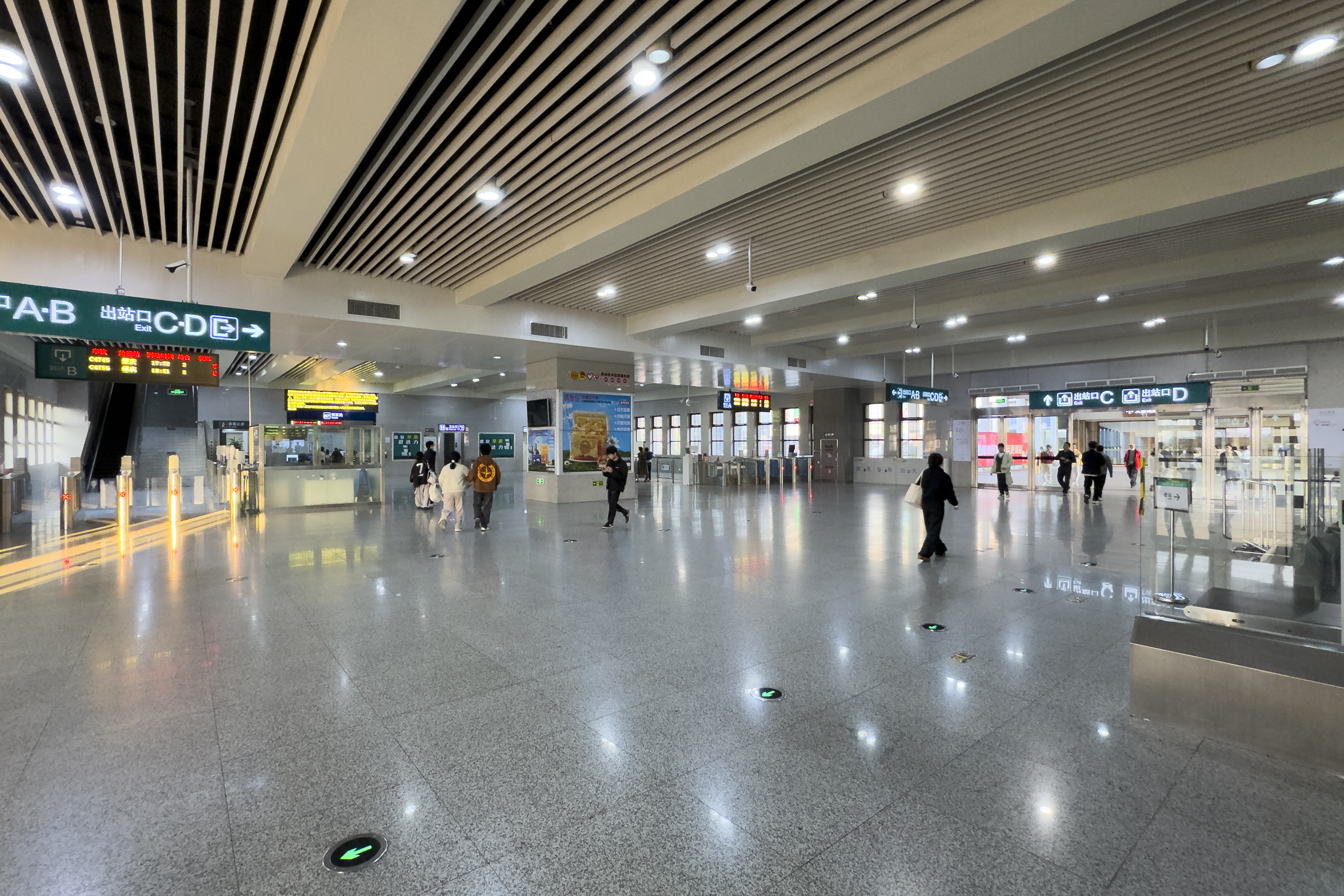
Concourse

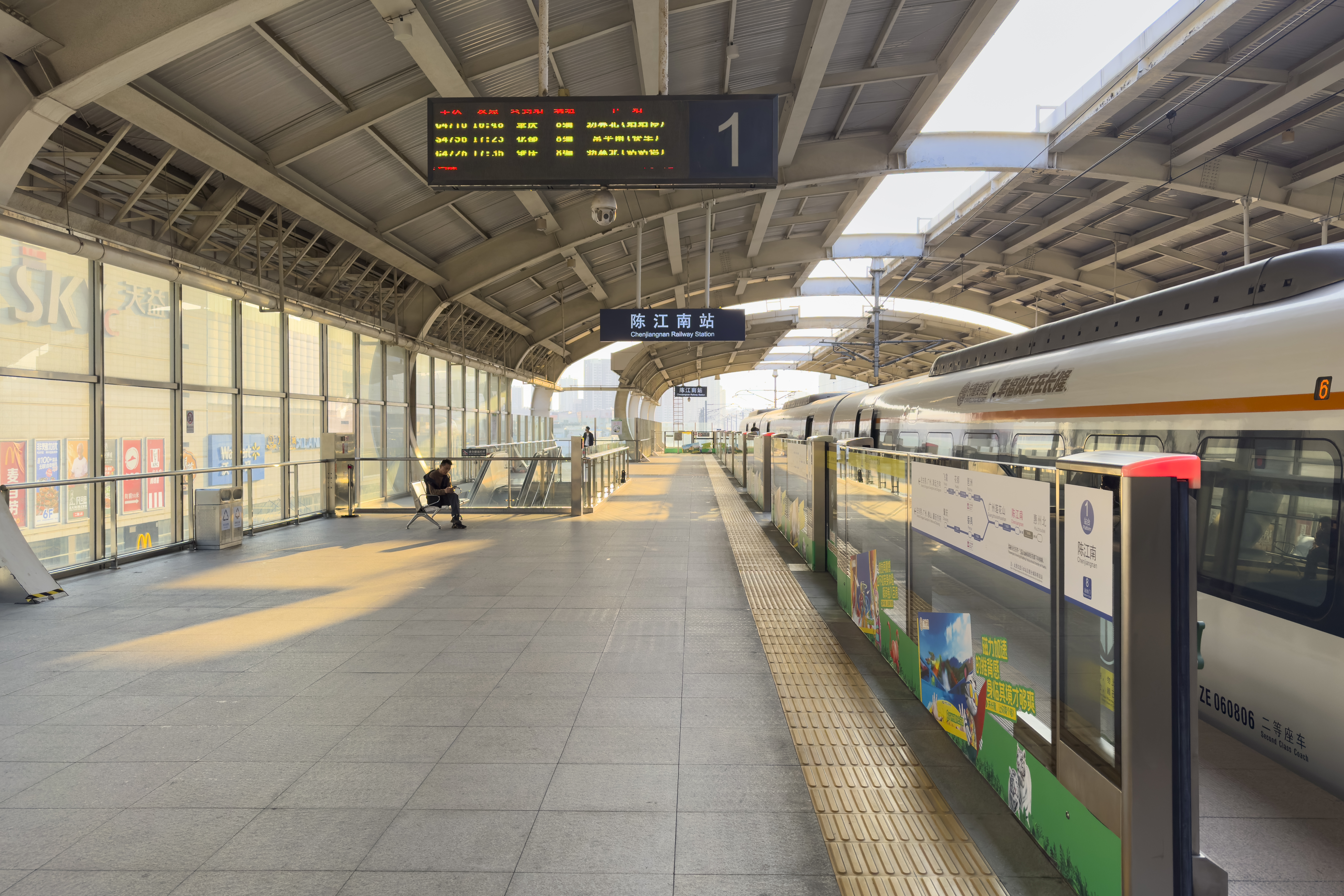
Platform

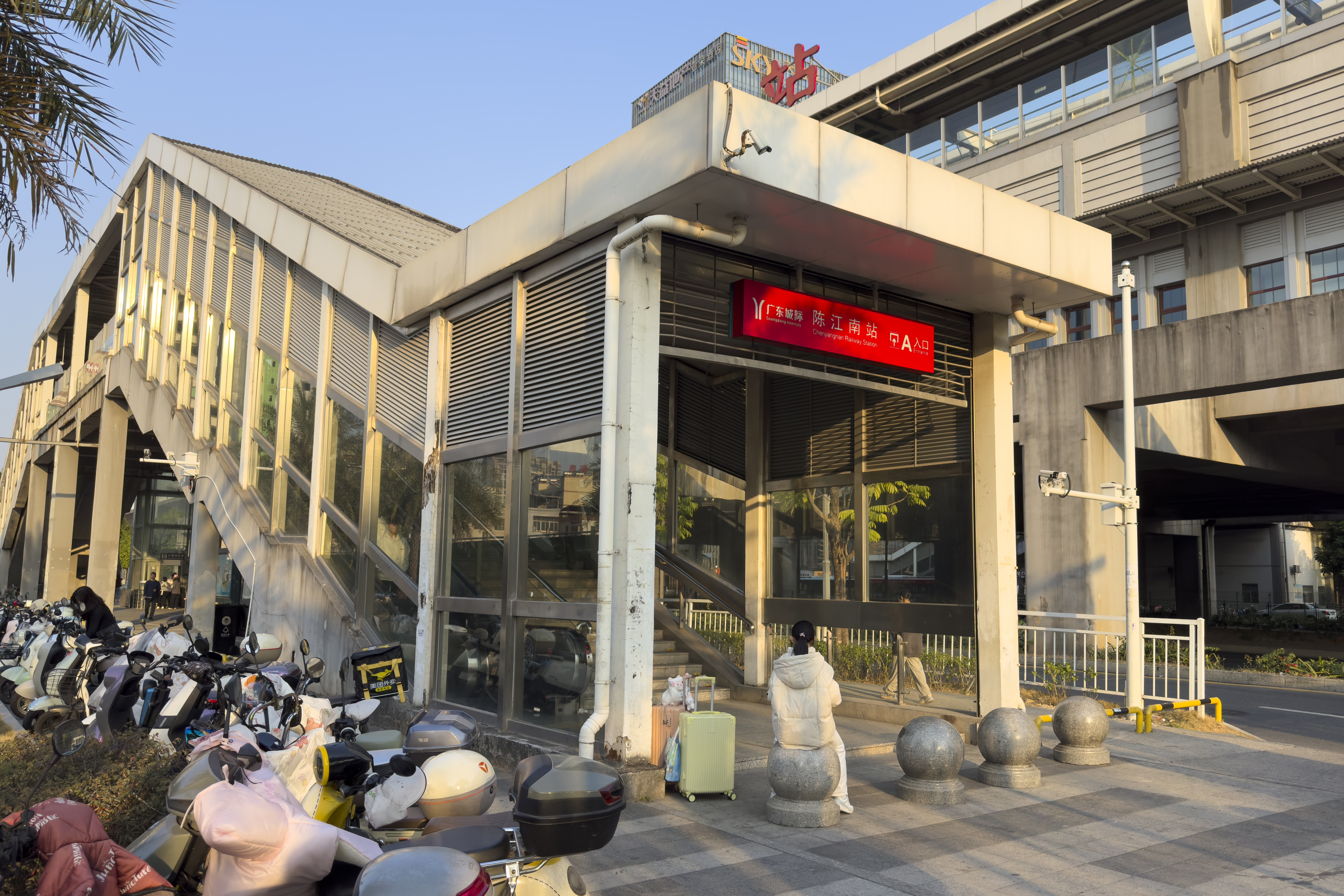
Exit A

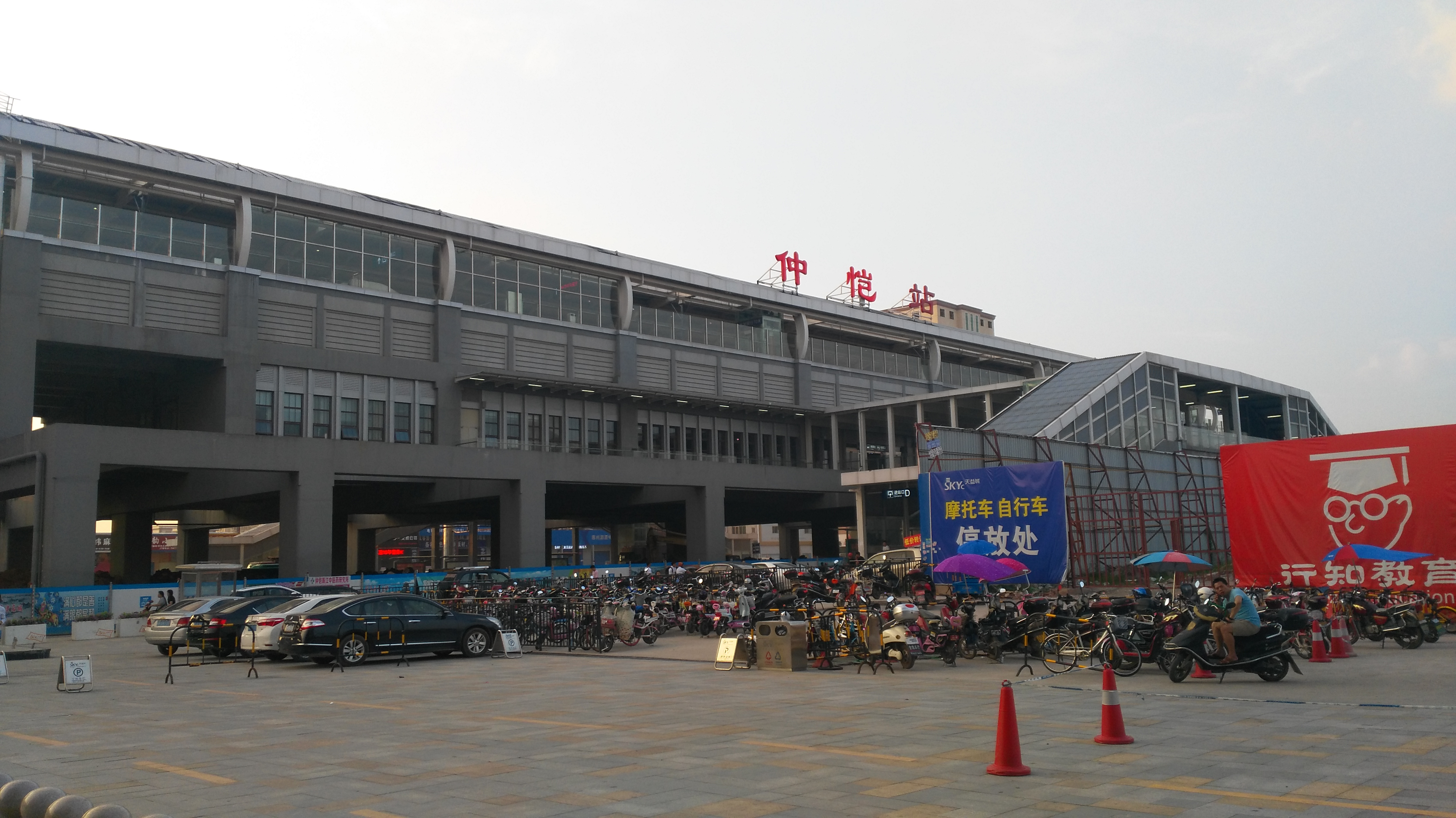
Station front in 2017, then known as Zhongkai
