= HCQ (disambiguation) =

HCQ is hydroxychloroquine, a medication for malaria, rheumatoid arthritis, lupus and porphyria cutanea tarda.

HCQ may also refer to:

- Halls Creek Airport (IATA code), Australia
- Huizhou railway station (telegram code), China
