= Luzhou, Guangdong =

Luzhou 芦洲镇
- Town
- Location in Guangdong
- Coordinates: 23°22′7″N 114°31′10″E
- Country: People's Republic of China
- Province: Guangdong
- Prefecture-level city: Huizhou
- District: Huicheng District
- Time zone: UTC+8 (China Standard)

Luzhou (simplified Chinese: 芦洲; traditional Chinese: 蘆洲; pinyin: Lúzhōu) is a town under the administration of Huicheng District, Huizhou, Guangdong, China. As of 2018, it has two residential communities and 19 villages under its administration.
