= West Lake (Huizhou) =

- 西湖 (Chinese)
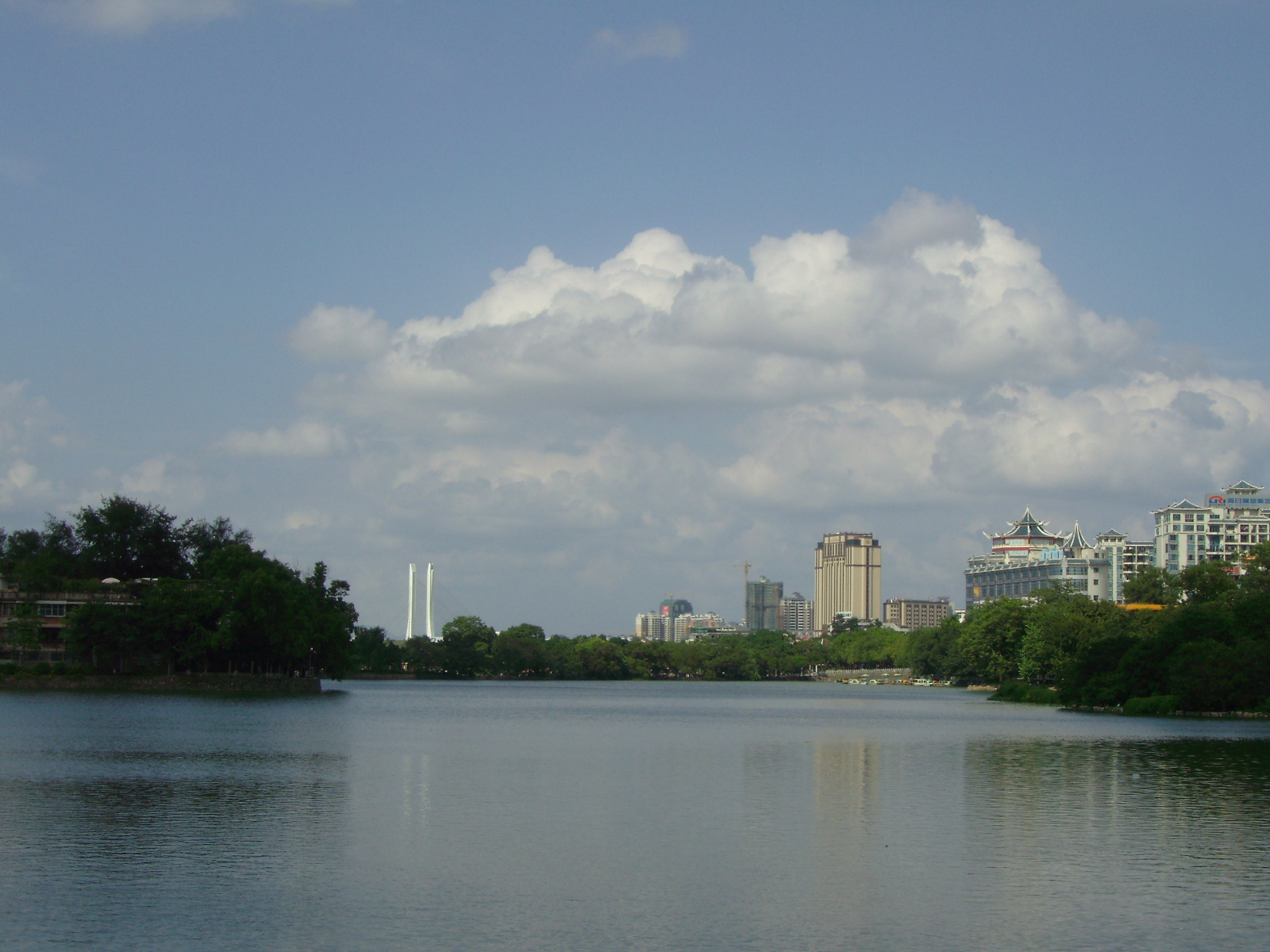
- West Lake in Huizhou, Guangdong, China.

- Location within Guangdong
- Location: Huicheng District, Huizhou, Guangdong, China
- Coordinates: 23°05′44″N 114°24′17″E
- Type: Lake
- Primary inflows: Shuilianshui (水帘水)
- Basin countries: China
- Built: 1991
- First flooded: 1991
- Surface area: 3.13 square kilometres (770 acres)
- Max. depth: 1.5 m (4.9 ft)

West Lake (Chinese: 西湖; pinyin: Xī Hú) is a man-made recreational lake in Huicheng District of Huizhou, Guangdong, China. West Lake has a combined area of 20.91 square kilometres (8.07 sq mi), of which 3.13 square kilometres (1.21 sq mi) is covered by water. It has been designated as a National AAAAA-level Scenic Spot.

== History ==
During the Eastern Han dynasty (25–220), West Lake is a field of wilderness.

In the Eastern Jin dynasty (317–420), a Buddhist temple named "Longxing Temple" (龙兴寺) was built near the lake.

Emperor Xuanzong (712–756) changed Longxing Temple to "Kaiyuan Temple" (开元寺) in the Tang dynasty (618–907). During the reign of Emperor Zhongzong (684), Sizhou Tower was completed in West Mountain.

In the Northern Song dynasty (960–1127), General Zhang Zhaoyuan (张招远) honored the lake as "Langguan Lake" (郎官湖). In 1066, Magistrate Chen Cheng (陈称) enlarged the lake and added several bridges, towers and pavilions, during that time, the lake more commonly known as "Feng Lake" (丰湖; Feng means a bumper harvest.) In 1094, Su Shi was exiled to Huizhou, where he lived for three years. Su Shi wrote a lot of poetry about West Lake. In his poem Presenting Tanxiu (赠昙秀), he compared Feng Lake to West Lake in Hangzhou, which became the earliest record of the name of West Lake. In 1096, the locals erected causeway named "Su Causeway" (苏堤) and the Xixin Bridge (西新桥) in memory of Su Shi. That same year, Wang Zhaoyun, the most beloved concubine of Su Shi, was buried in the side of West Lake. Su Shi established a pavilion named "Liuru Pavilion" (六如亭) to commemorate her.

In 1244, in the 4th year of Chunyou period of the Southern Song dynasty (1127–1279), locals founded the Juxian Hall (聚贤堂) within the West Lake, which was renamed "Fenghu Academy" (丰湖书院) later. It is the highest school during the Ming (1368–1644) and Qing dynasties (1644–1911). Now the Fenghu Academy was rebuilt in 1801 by Magistrate Yi Bingshou (伊秉绶).

From the 1950s to the 1980s, the area of the West Lake has been reduced by 46% because of real estate development. In 2007, the Huizhou Municipal Government has allocated 150 million yuan for the reconstruction project. Starting from the 1970s the water quality of the lake has deteriorated due to sewage flowing into its basin, resulting in high concentration of nutrients and eutrophication. However, in 2018 a basin of the lake has been successfully restored, using the method of biomanipulation.

== Geography ==
The West Lake is divided into the South Lake (南湖), Feng Lake (丰湖), Ping Lake (平湖), E Lake (鳄湖) and Ling Lake (菱湖).

The West Lake is in the subtropical monsoon climate zone, enjoying ample sunshine and abundant precipitation. The highest temperature is 22.5 °C (72.5 °F), and the lowest temperature is 19.5 °C (67.1 °F). Its total annual rainfall of 1,731-millimetre (68.1 in).

== Tourist attractions ==
=== Six lakes ===
- South Lake (南湖)
- Feng Lake (丰湖)
- Ping Lake (平湖)
- E Lake (鳄湖)
- Ling Lake (菱湖)
- Honghua Lake (红花湖)

=== Nine bridges ===
- Gongbei Bridge (拱北桥)
- Xixin Bridge (西新桥)
- Mingsheng Bridge (明圣桥)
- Yuantong Bridge (圆通桥)
- Yanxia Bridge (烟霞桥)
- Yingxian Bridge (迎仙桥)
- Jiuqu Bridge (九曲桥)
- Pipa Bridge (枇杷桥)
- Huazhou Bridge (花洲桥)

== Natural history ==
As of 2004, West Lake has 117 species of phytoplankton, 127 species of plants, 50 species of birds, 50 species of reptiles and amphibians, and over 50 species of fish.

== Gallery ==
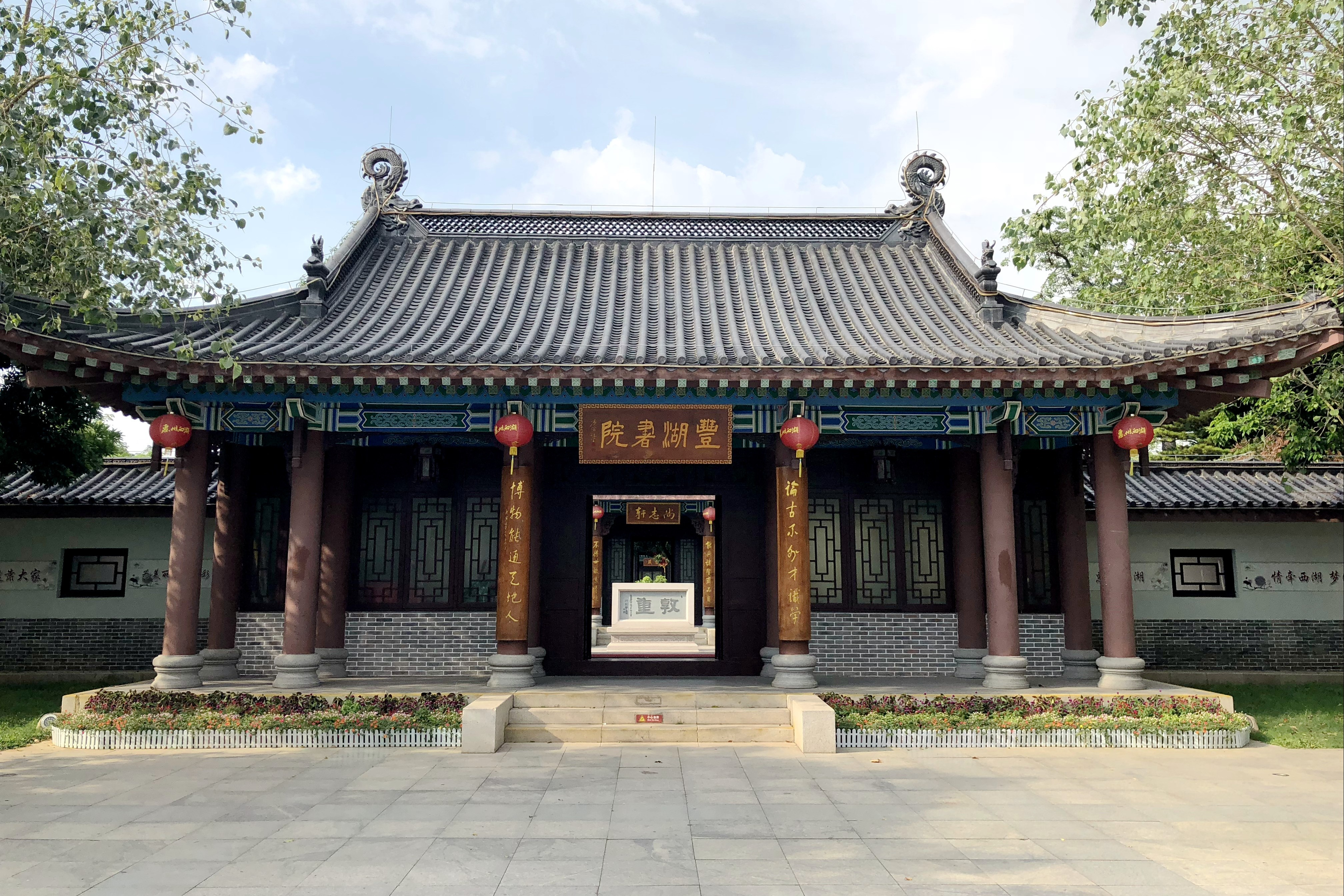
Fenghu Academy.

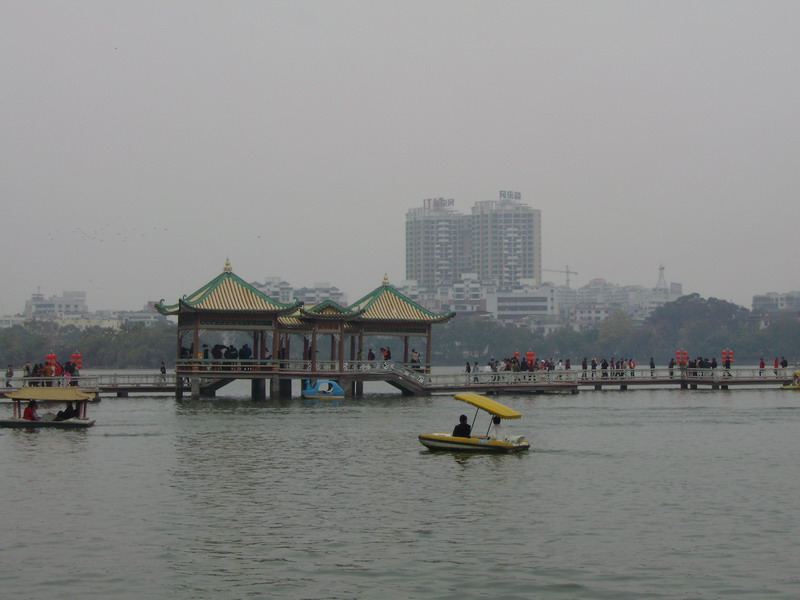
Jiuqu Bridge.

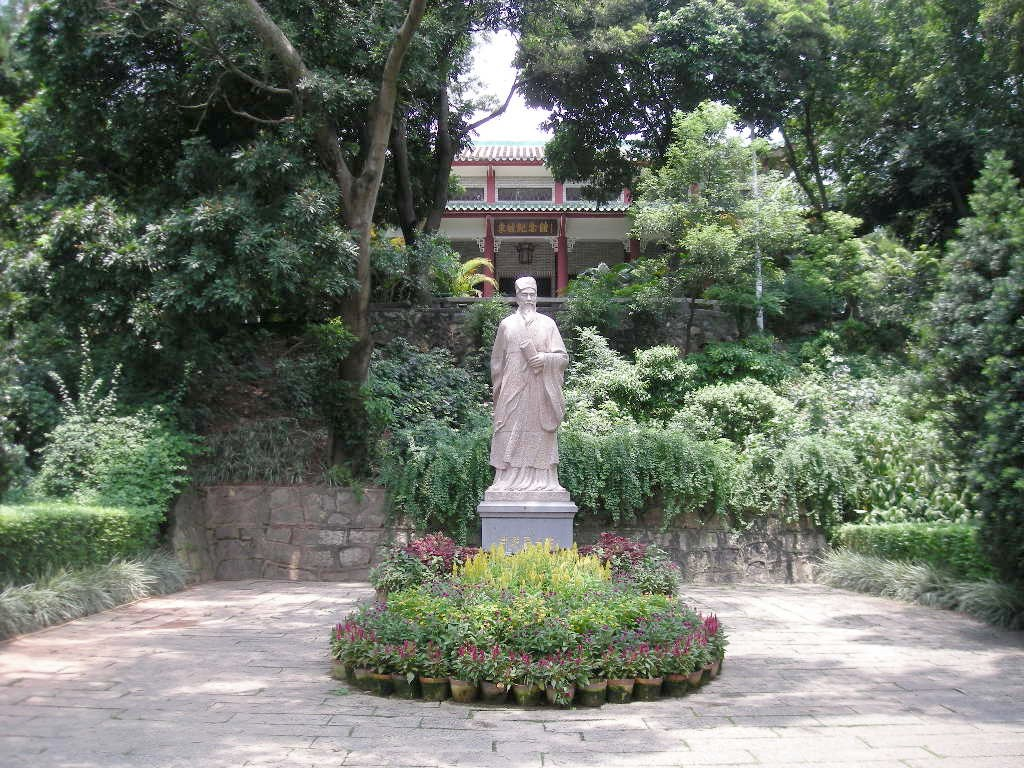
Memorial Hall of Su Dongpo.

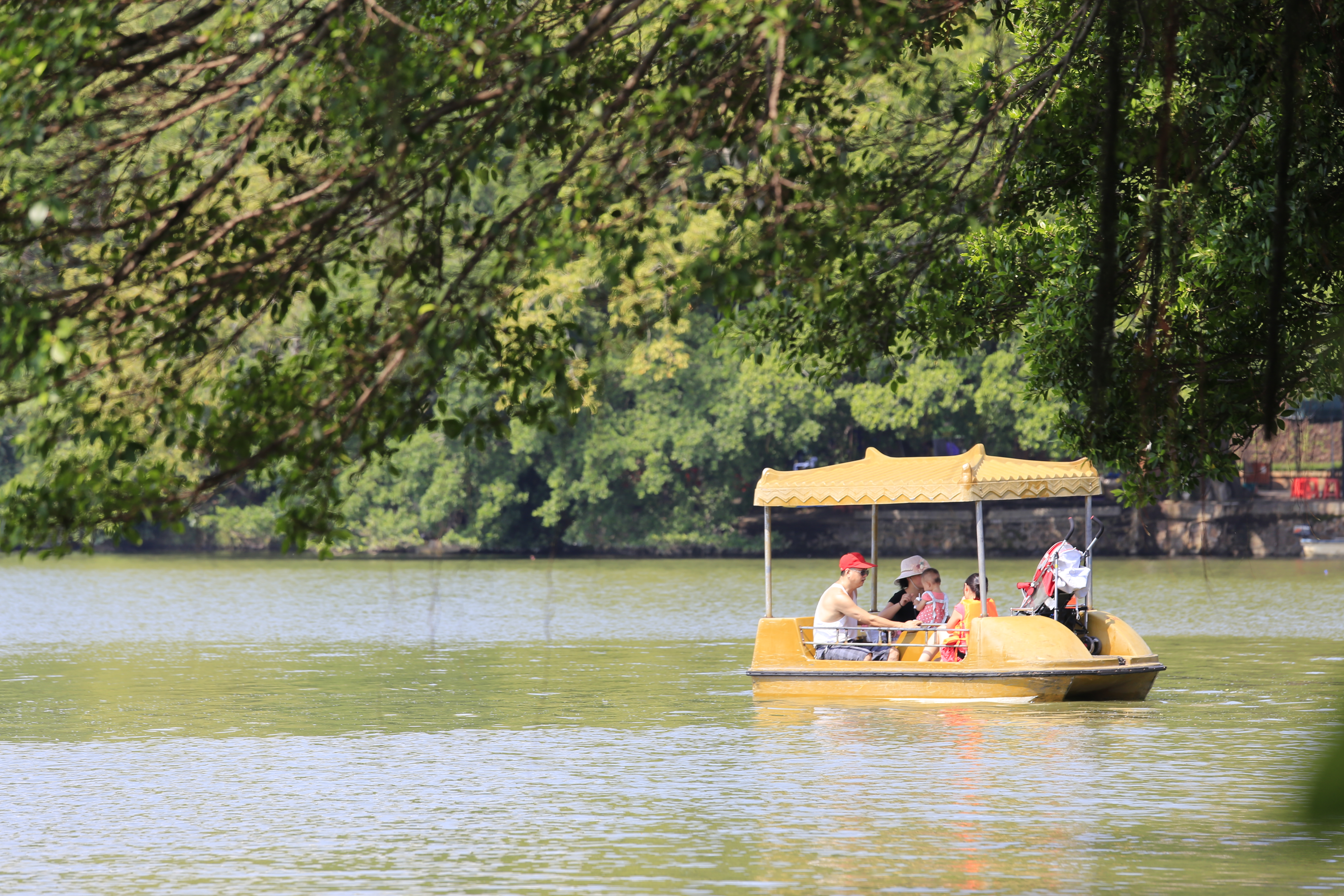
View of West Lake (1).

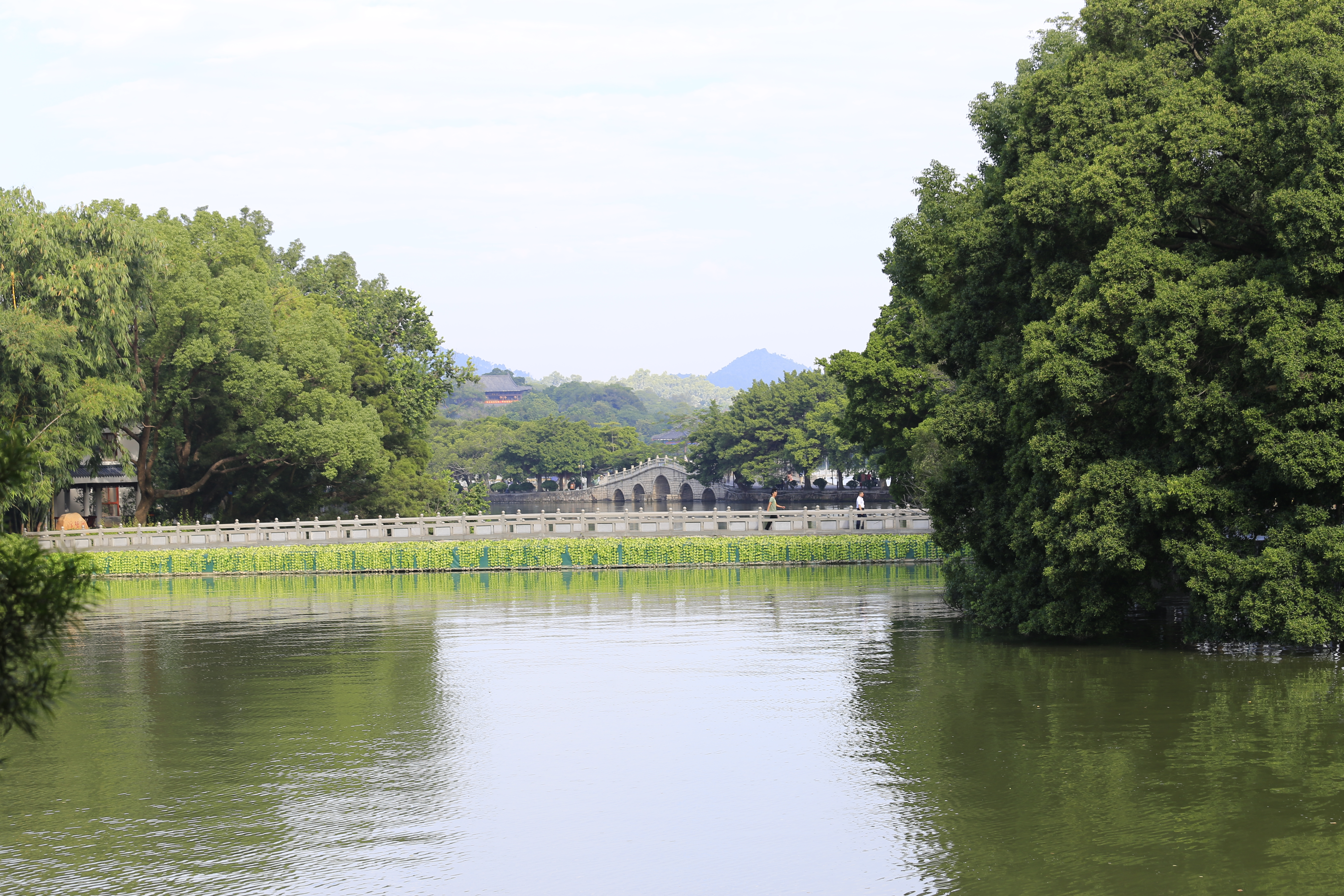
View of West Lake (2).

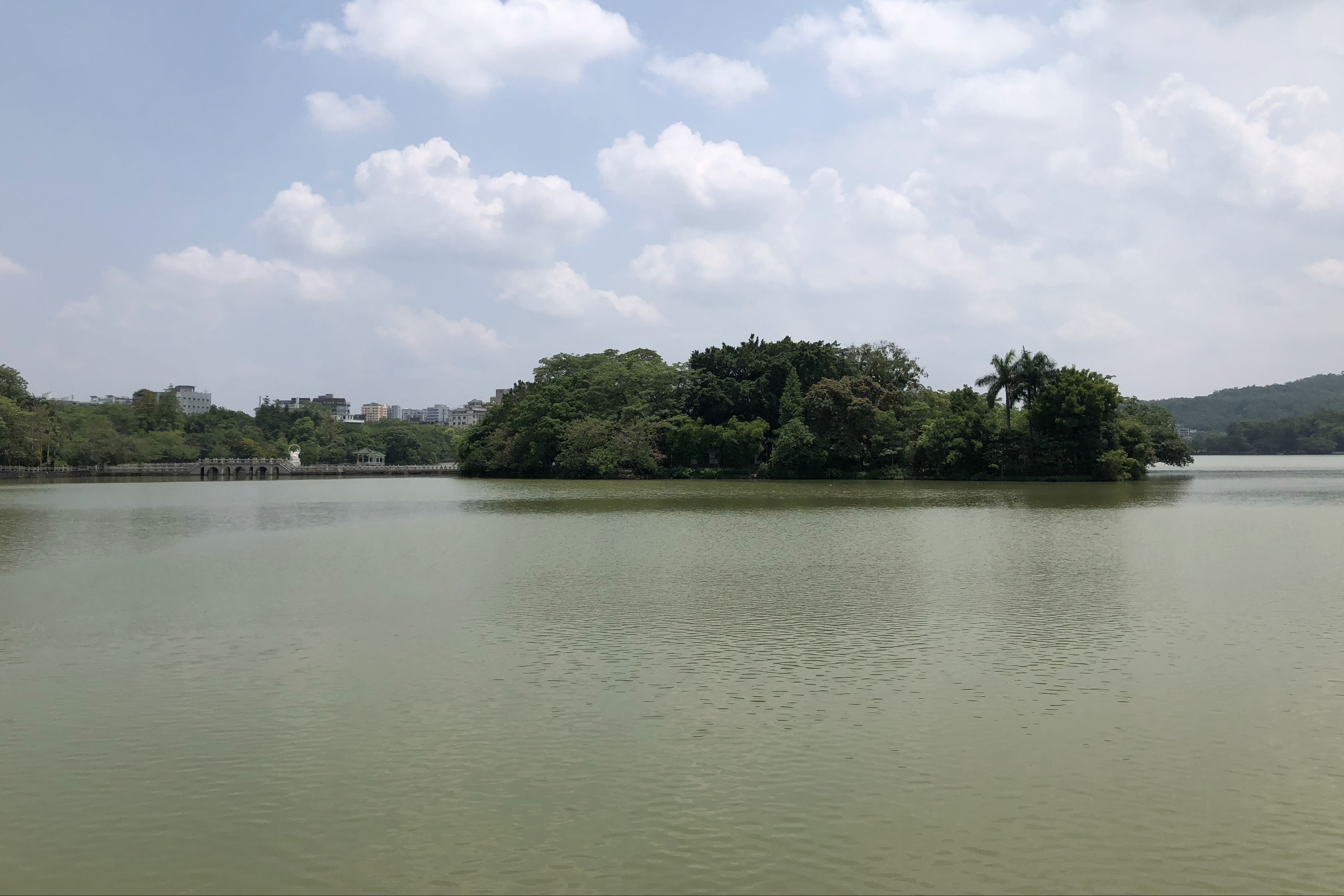
Baihuazhou or Hundred Flowers Islet (百花洲).
