= Huizhou railway station =

Railway station in Guangdong, China

Huizhou 惠州
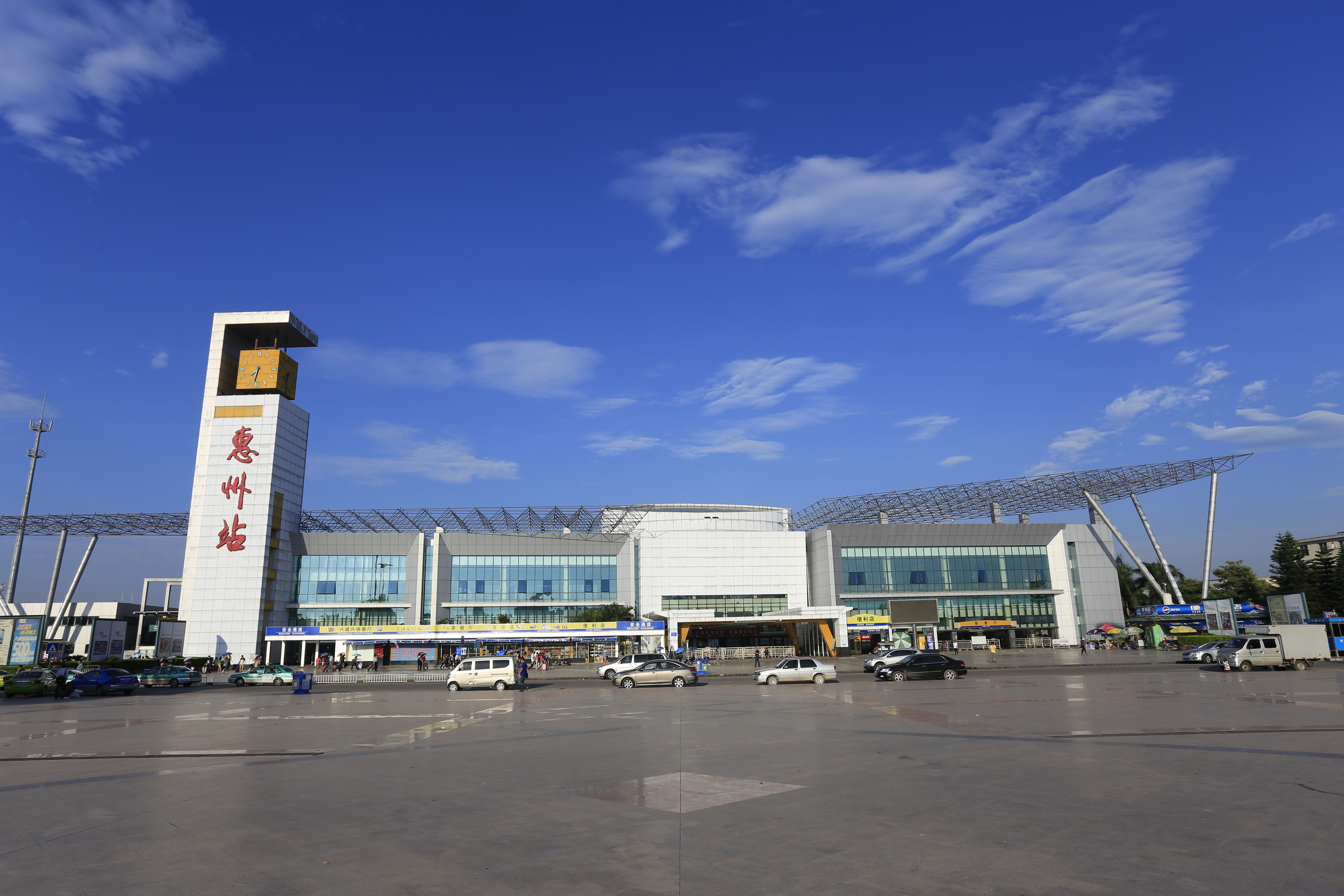
- Exterior

General information
- Location: China
- Coordinates: 23°09′15″N 114°24′40″E
- Lines: Beijing-Kowloon railway; Guangzhou–Meizhou–Shantou railway
- Platforms: 3 (1 island platform and 1 side platform)
- Tracks: 6
- Connections: Xiaojinkou

Construction
- Structure type: At-grade
- Accessible: Yes

Other information
- Station code: HCQ (PInyin: HZH)

History
- Opened: 1990; 36 years ago
- Former names: Huizhou North (1990-2003)
Location

Huizhou railway station (Chinese: 惠州站) is a railway station on the Beijing–Kowloon railway located in Huicheng District, Huizhou, Guangdong, China. Opened in 1990, it was previously known as Huizhou North railway station until it was given its current name in 2003. It is operated by China Railway Guangzhou Group. The station offers a connection to Xiaojinkou railway station on the Guangzhou–Huizhou intercity railway.

== History ==
- 1990: Huizhou North Station was completed and opened, and it was a fourth-class station.
- On January 10, 2003, the Beijing-Kowloon Railway double line opened to traffic, and the new station building of Huizhou North Station was officially opened. On June 1 of the same year, it was renamed Huizhou Station and the original Huizhou Station was renamed Huizhou West Station.
- On June 27, 2020, the improvement project of the passenger transportation facilities of Huizhou Station officially started, including raising the platform, adding a pedestrian bridge across the platform, and adding an escalator and elevator to the station building. The improvement project was completed in December of the same year and officially opened on January 10, 2021.

== Usage ==
Huizhou Station is serviced by the Beijing-Kowloon railway. About 50 passenger trains are handled daily.

Preceding station	China Railway	Following station
Heyuan towards Beijing West	Beijing–Kowloon railway	Huizhou West towards Hung Hom
