= Huizhou North railway station =

Railway station in Huizhou, Guangdong

Huizhoubei 惠州北
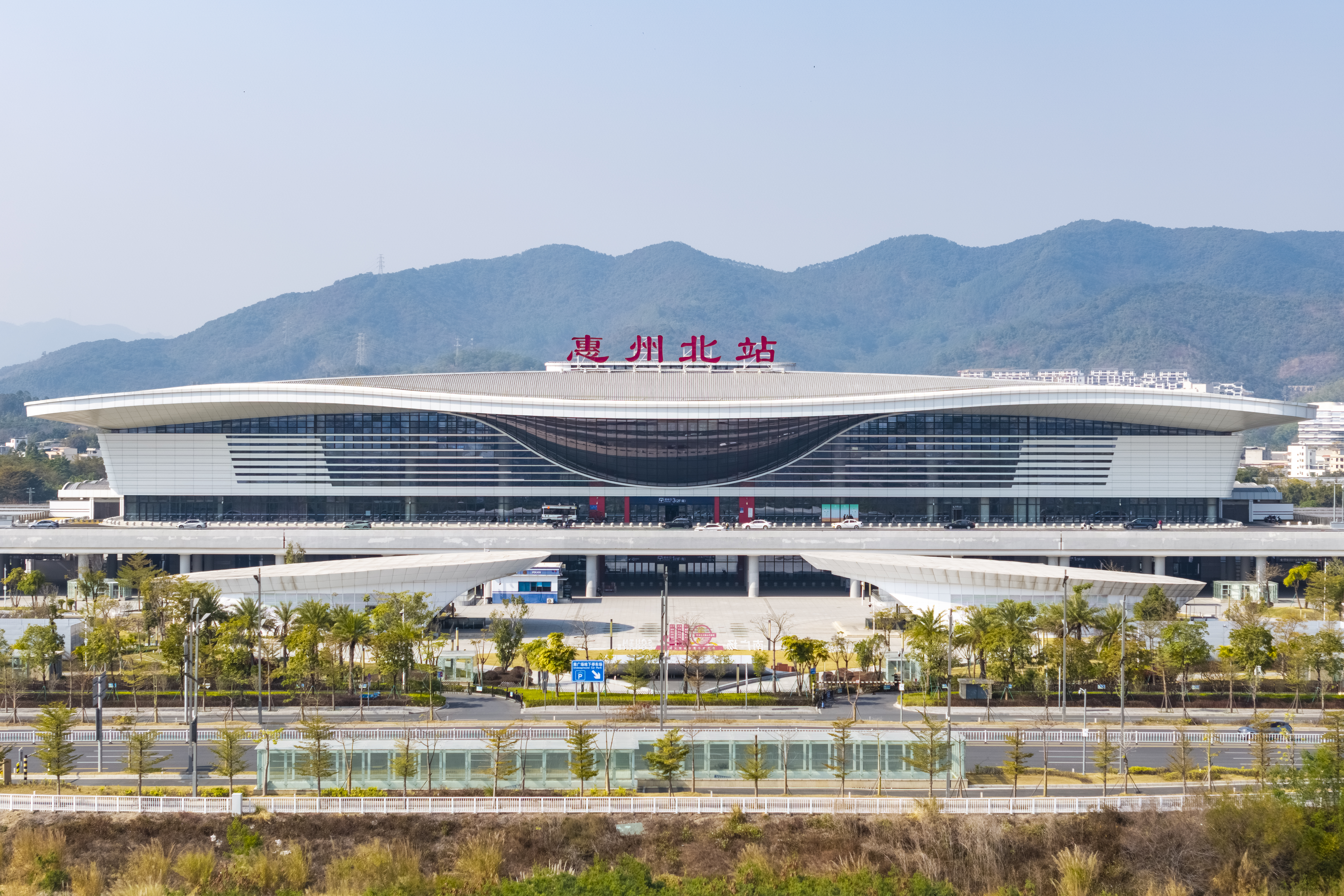
- Exterior

Chinese name
- Chinese: 惠州北站
Transcriptions
Standard Mandarin
- Hanyu Pinyin: Huìzhōu Běi Zhàn
Yue: Cantonese
- Yale Romanization: Waih-jāu Bāk Jaahm
- Jyutping: Wai^{6}zau^{1} Bak^{1} Zaam^{6}

General information
- Location: Baishi Village (白石村), Xiaojinkou Subdistrict, Huicheng District, Huizhou, Guangdong; China
- Coordinates: 23°11′04″N 114°22′32″E
- Operated by: CR Guangzhou; Pearl River Delta Metropolitan Region intercity railway
- Lines: Ganzhou–Shenzhen high-speed railway Guangzhou–Huizhou intercity railway
- Platforms: 14 (7 island platforms)
- Tracks: 14

Construction
- Structure type: Elevated
- Accessible: Yes

Other information
- Station code: HUA (Pinyin: HZB)

History
- Opened: 10 December 2021 (4 years ago) ( station); 29 September 2025 (9 months ago) ( station)

Services
Preceding station	China Railway High-speed	Following station
Boluo North towards Ganzhou West	Ganzhou–Shenzhen high-speed railway	Zhongkai towards Shenzhen North
Preceding station	Pearl River Delta Metropolitan Region Intercity Railway	Following station
Xiaojinkou towards Panyu	Guangzhou–Huizhou intercity railway	Terminus
Location

Huizhou North railway station (Chinese: 惠州北站; pinyin: Huìzhōu Běi Zhàn) is a railway station in Huicheng District, Huizhou, Guangdong, China. This station opened in 2021 with the Ganzhou–Shenzhen high-speed railway. Guangzhou–Huizhou intercity railway was extended to this station from Xiaojinkou on 29 September 2025. A spur to the Guangzhou–Shanwei high-speed railway allows southbound trains to continue to Guangzhou.

== See also ==
- Huizhou railway station
- Huiyang railway station
- Huizhou South railway station
