= Huicheng, Huizhou =

Huicheng 惠城区
- District
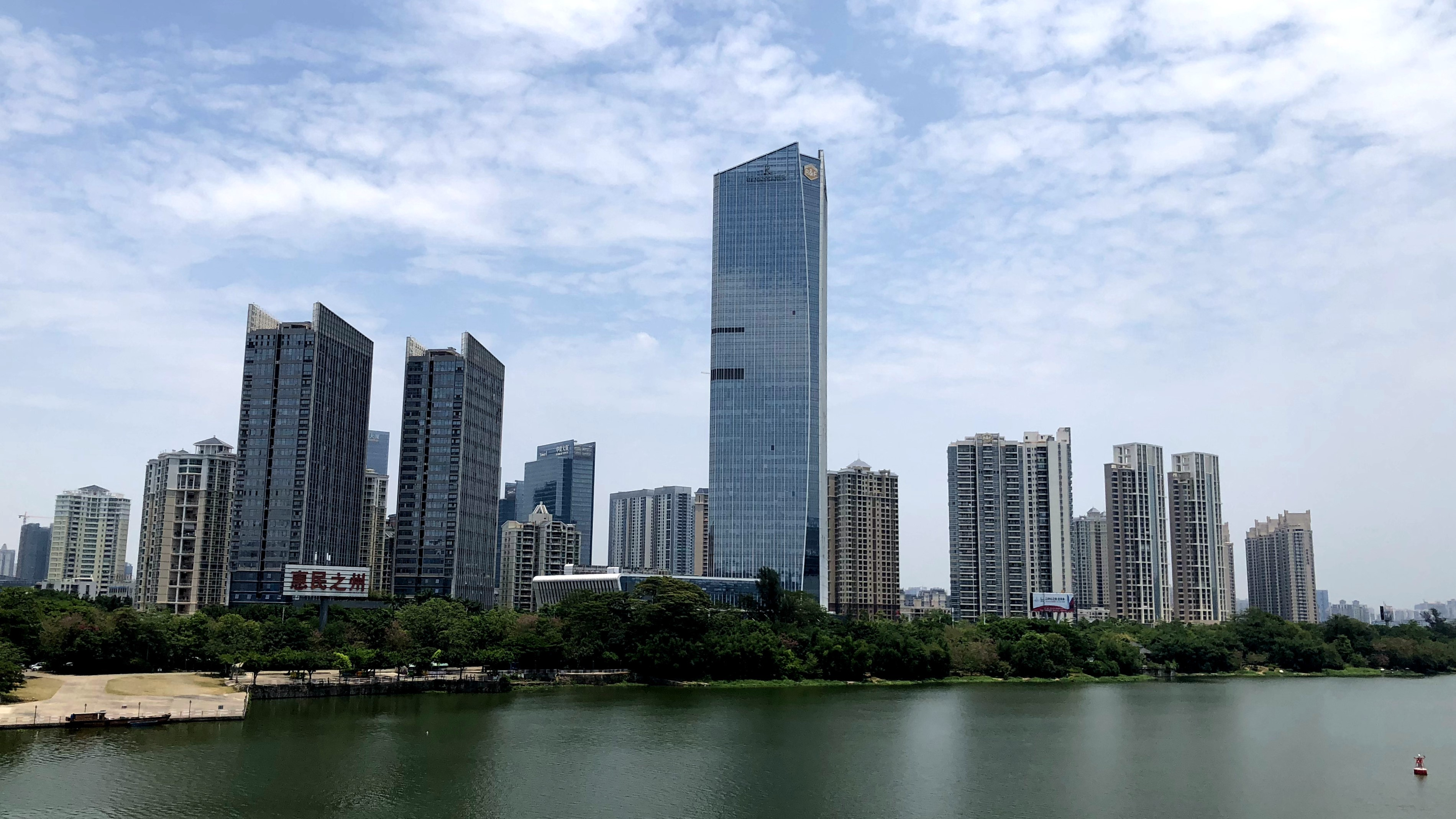
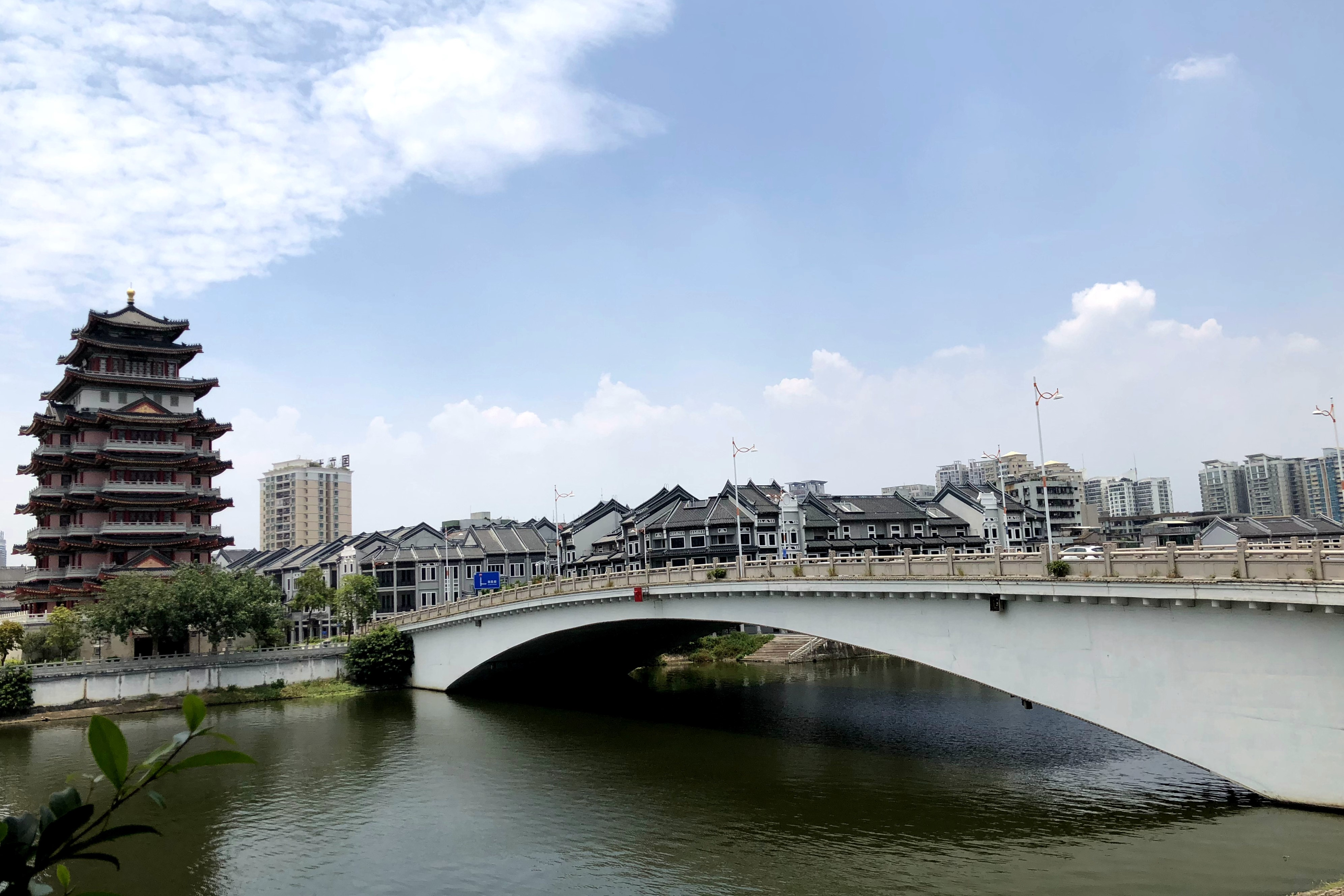
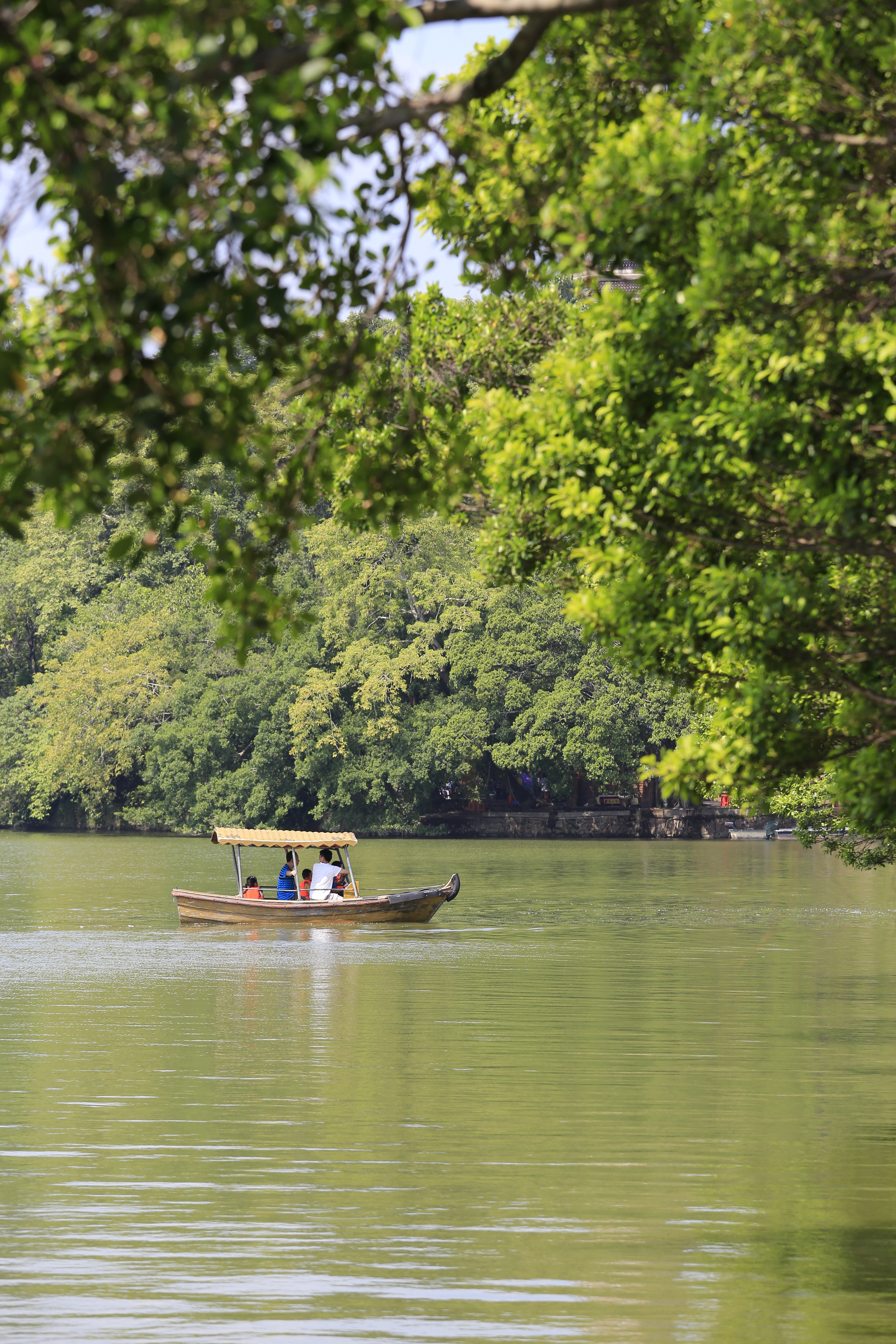
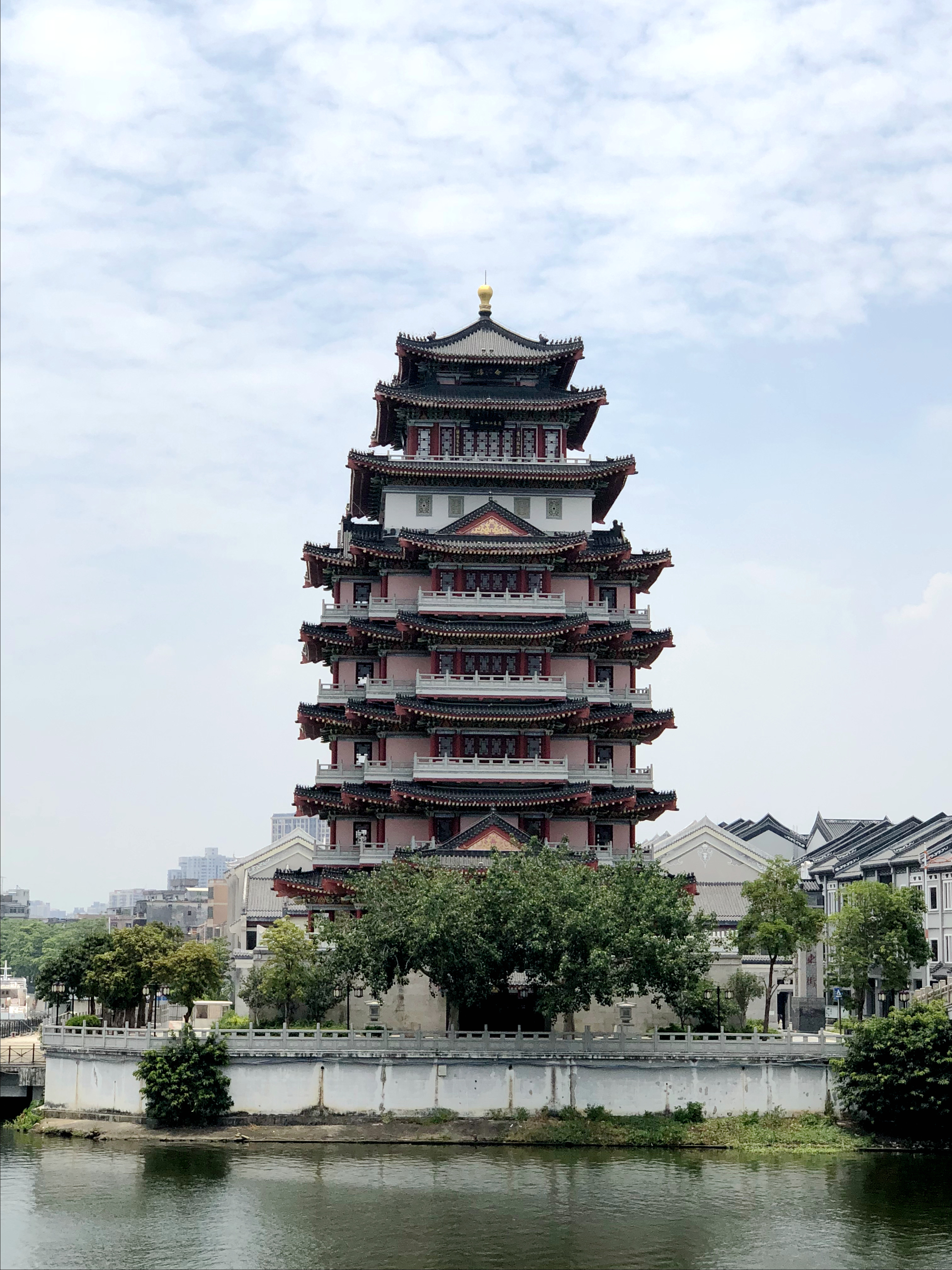
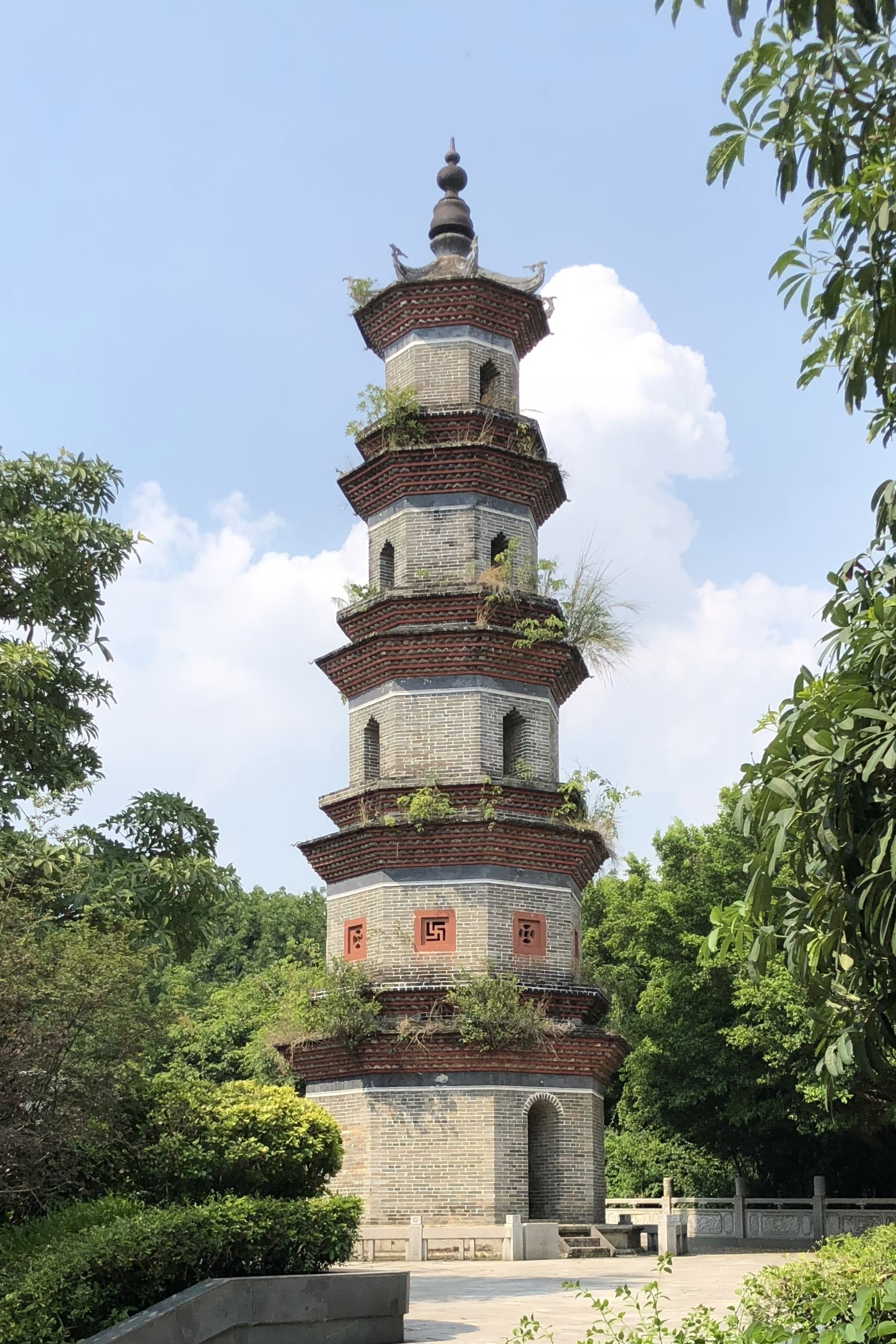
- Jiangbei CBD Dongxin Bridge West Lake Hejiang Tower Wenbi Pagoda

- Location in Guangdong
- Coordinates: 23°04′40″N 114°23′07″E
- Country: People's Republic of China
- Province: Guangdong
- Prefecture-level city: Huizhou

Area
  - Total: 1,410 km^{2} (540 sq mi)

Population (2020)
  - Total: 2,090,578
  - Density: 1,480/km^{2} (3,840/sq mi)
- Time zone: UTC+8 (China Standard)

Huicheng District (Chinese: 惠城区; pinyin: Huìchéng Qū) is a district of Huizhou City, Guangdong Province, China. Huicheng is the northern urban center of Huizhou along with Huiyang as the southern urban center.

== Administrative divisions ==
Huicheng is responsible for the administration of ten subdistricts and eight towns.

Name	Chinese (S)	Hanyu Pinyin	Population (2010)	Area (km^{2})
Qiaodong Subdistrict	桥东街道	Qiáodōng Jiēdào	100,374	13.57
Qiaoxi Subdistrict	桥西街道	Qiáoxī Jiēdào	159,591	8.8
Jiangnan Subdistrict	江南街道	Jiāngnán Jiēdào	74,602	28
Jiangbei Subdistrict	江北街道	Jiāngběi Jiēdào	104,494	15
Longfeng Subdistrict	龙丰街道	Lóngfēng Jiēdào	81,053	46
Henan'an Subdistrict	河南岸街道	Hénán'àn Jiēdào	181,755	45
Huihuan Subdistrict	惠环街道	Huìhuán Jiēdào	173,852	36
Chenjiang Subdistrict	陈江街道	Chénjiāng Jiēdào	138,694	83
Shuikou Subdistrict	水口街道	Shuǐkǒu Jiēdào	137,286	120
Xiaojinkou Subdistrict	小金口街道	Xiǎojīnkǒu Jiēdào	105,554	66.7
Ruhu town	汝湖镇	Rǔhú Zhèn	45,990	173
Sandong town	三栋镇	Sāndòng Zhèn	35,410	67.8
Tonghu town	潼湖镇	Tónghú Zhèn	35,706	112.5
Lilin town	沥林镇	Lìlín Zhèn	57,476	49
Ma'an town	马安镇	Mǎ'ān Zhèn	55,414	76
Hengli town	横沥镇	Hénglì Zhèn	44,488	343
Luzhou town	芦洲镇	Lúzhōu Zhèn	15,890	160
Tongqiao town	潼侨镇	Tóngqiáo Zhèn	30,335	31

== Transportation ==
Huizhou railway station and Huizhou North railway station, 2 major railway stations of China Railway, are located in the district.
