= Guanqiao =

Guanqiao (simplified Chinese: 官桥; traditional Chinese: 官橋; pinyin: Guānqiáo) may refer to:

== Stations ==
- Guanqiao station (官桥站), future elevated station of Line 4, Guangzhou Metro, opening in 2026
- Guanqiao North railway station (官桥北站), or Guanqiaobei railway station, an intercity rail station on Foshan–Dongguan intercity railway, that opened on 26 May 2024

== Towns (官桥镇) ==
- Guanqiao, Xiao County, in Xiao County, Anhui
- Guanqiao, Anxi County, in Anxi County, Fujian
- Guanqiao, Nan'an, Fujian, in Nan'an City, Fujian
- Guanqiao, Huazhou, in Huazhou, Guangdong
- Guanqiao, Liuyang, in Liuyang City, Hunan
- Guanqiao, Jiayu County, in Jiayu County, Hubei
- Guanqiao, Tengzhou, in Tengzhou City, Shandong

== Others ==
- Guan Qiao (关桥), a Chinese engineer specializing in welding
