= Changlong station =

Changlong station or Changlong railway station may refer to:

- Hanxi Changlong station, a metro station on Guangzhou Metro Line 3 and Line 7.
- Guangzhou Changlong railway station, on Foshan–Dongguan intercity railway.
- Changlong station (Shenzhen Metro), a metro station on Shenzhen Metro Line 5.
- Zhuhai Changlong railway station
