= Guangzhou Changlong railway station =

Guangdong Intercity railway station in Guangzhou, China

Guangzhouchanglong 广州长隆
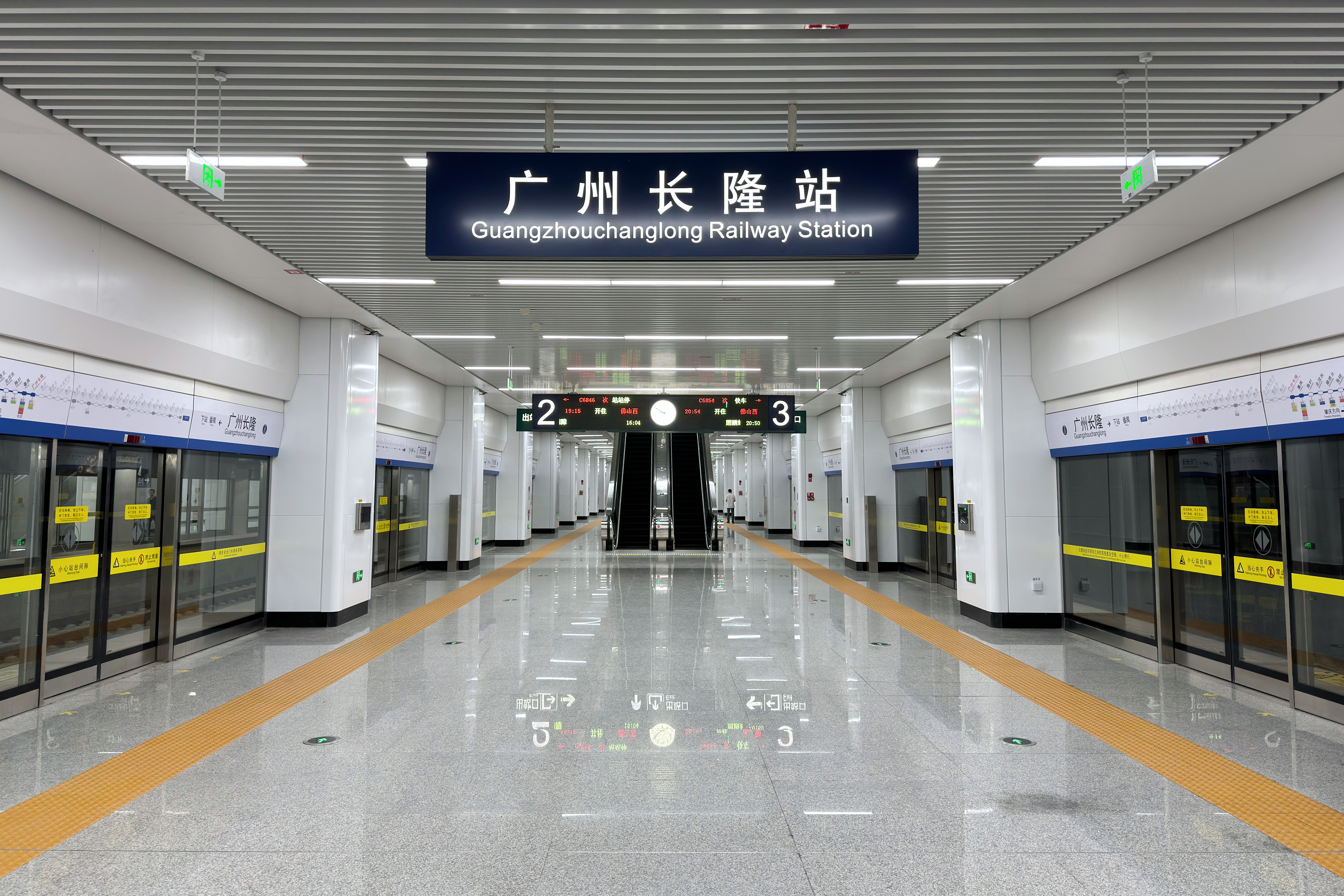
- Platform 2 and 3 of Guangzhouchanglong Railway Station

Chinese name
- Simplified Chinese: 广州长隆站
- Traditional Chinese: 廣州長隆站
- Postal: Canton Chimelong station
Transcriptions
Standard Mandarin
- Hanyu Pinyin: Guǎngzhōu Chánglóng Zhàn
Yue: Cantonese
- Yale Romanization: Gwóngjāu Chèuhnglùhng Jaahm
- Jyutping: Gwong^{2}zau^{1} Coeng^{4}lung^{4} Zaam^{6}

General information
- Location: Southeast of intersection of Hanxi Boulevard East (汉溪大道东) and Xinguang Expressway (新光快速路), Zhongcun Subdistrict, Panyu District, Guangzhou, Guangdong; China
- Coordinates: 22°59′34.84″N 113°19′29.68″E
- Owner: Pearl River Delta Metropolitan Region intercity railway
- Operator: Guangdong Intercity
- Line: Guangzhou–Huizhou intercity railway
- Platforms: 3 (1 island platform and 1 side platform)
- Tracks: 3
- Connections: 3 7 Hanxi Changlong

Construction
- Structure type: Underground
- Accessible: Yes

Other information
- Station code: GCA (Pinyin: GZL)

History
- Opened: 26 May 2024 (2 years ago)

Services
Preceding station	Pearl River Delta Metropolitan Region Intercity Railway	Following station
Panyu Terminus	Guangzhou–Huizhou intercity railway	Donghuan towards Huizhou North
Transfer at Hanxi Changlong
Preceding station	Guangzhou Metro	Following station
Shiqiao towards Haibang	Line 3 transfer at Hanxi Changlong	Dashi towards Airport North (Terminal 2) or Tianhe Coach Terminal
Zhongcun towards Meidi Dadao	Line 7 transfer at Hanxi Changlong	Nancun Wanbo towards Yanshan
Location

Guangzhouchanglong railway station (Chinese: 广州长隆站; pinyin: Guǎngzhōu Chánglóng Zhàn; Cantonese Yale: Gwóngjāu Chèuhnglùhng Jaahm) is an underground railway station on Guangzhou–Huizhou intercity railway located in Panyu District, Guangzhou, Guangdong, China. The station was officially named as Guangzhouchanglong railway station in November 2020. The railway station opened on 26 May 2024, and is operated by Guangdong Intercity Railway Operation Co., Ltd.

== Usage ==
After the opening of this station, the passenger flow has performed well, and many passengers will use this station to transfer to the subway to enter the downtown area of Guangzhou, or go to Chimelong Paradise and Guangzhou Chimelong Tourist Resort. Since the Guangzhou-Huizhou and Guangzhou-Zhaoqing intercity connections were put into operation, the station has the third largest passenger flow among the five cities on the line.

== Station structure and entrances/exits ==
The station has an underground island platform and a side platform. There are 5 points of entry/exit, lettered A-E. Currently only Exits B and E are open. Exit B is accessible via elevator.

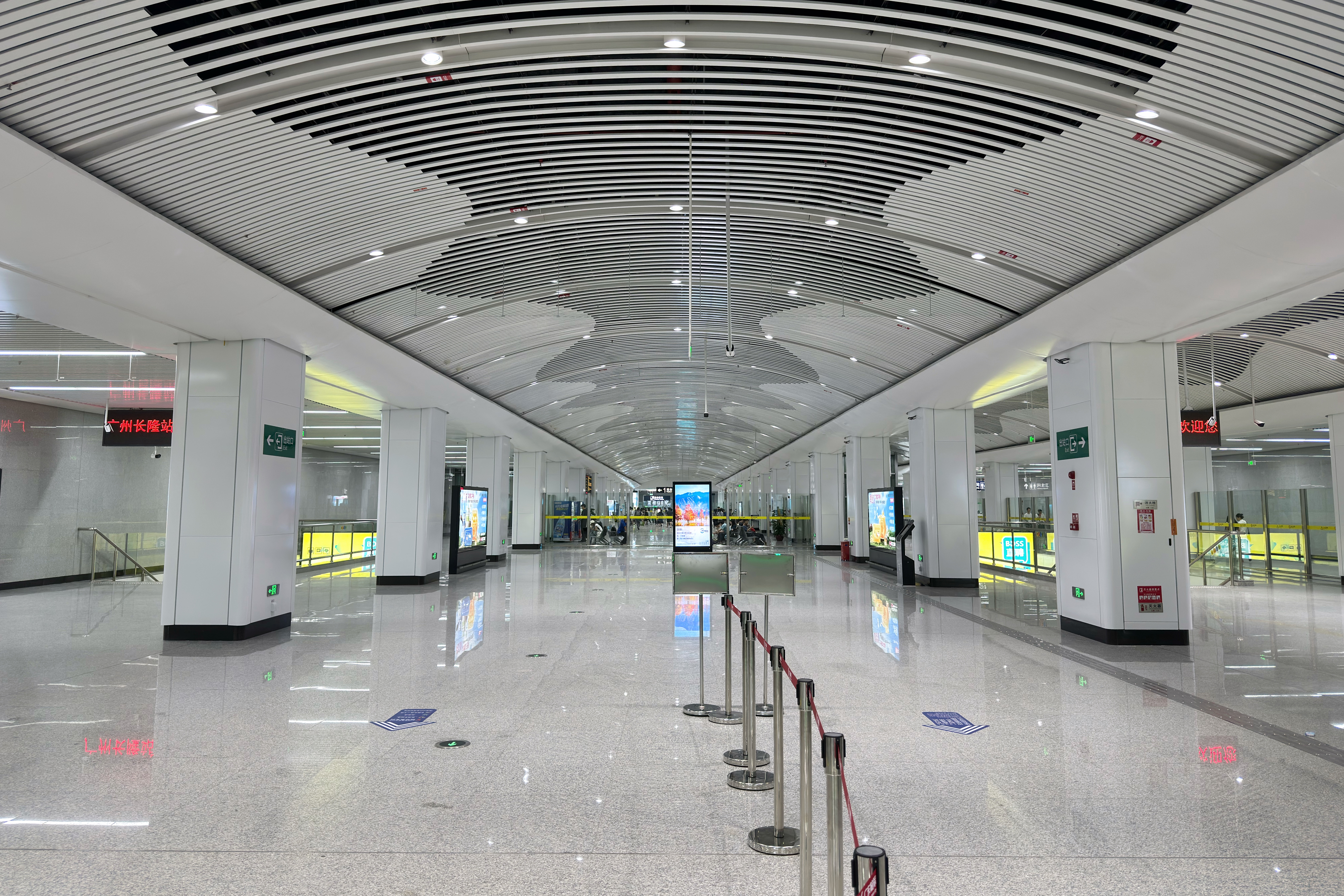
Concourse

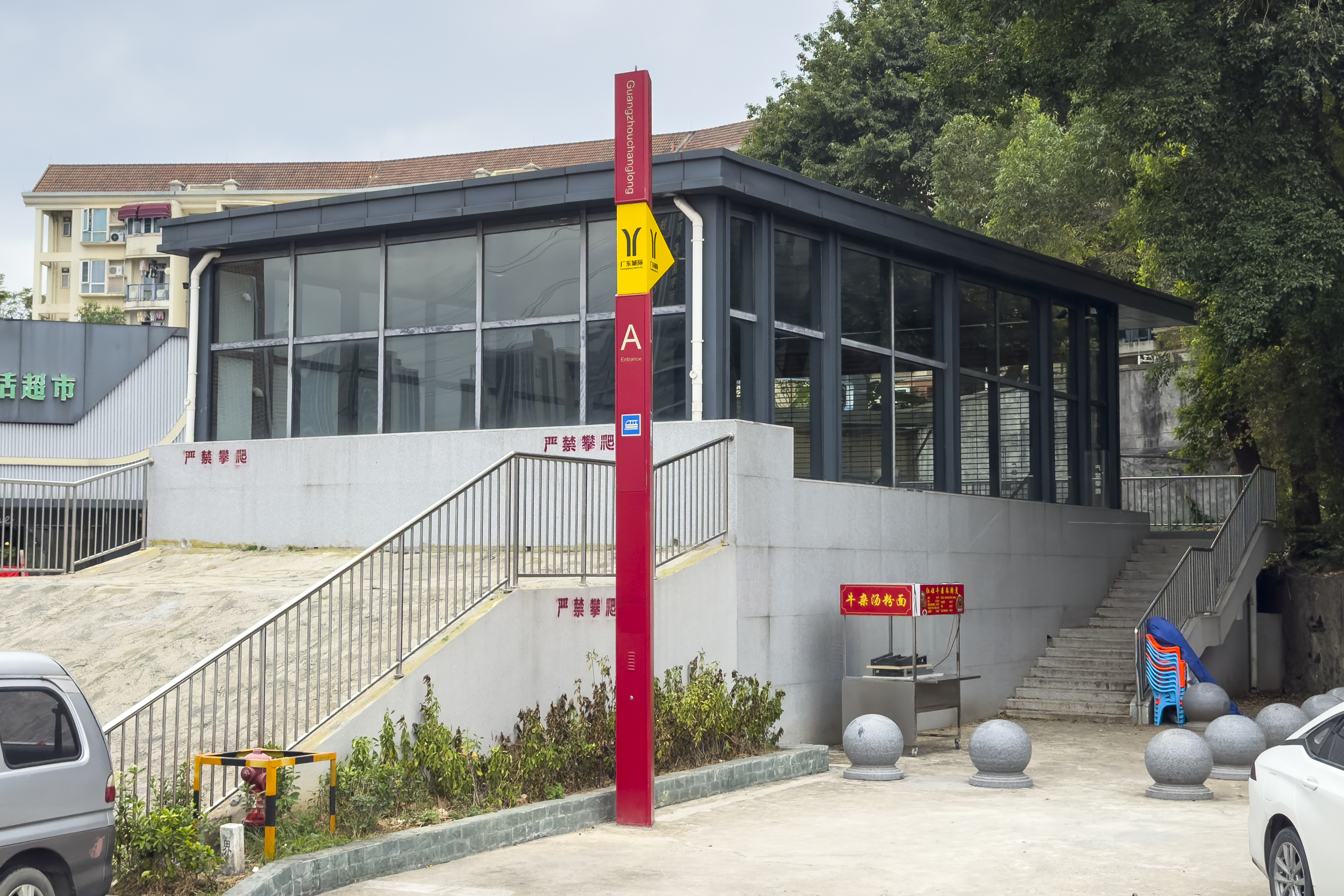
Entrance A (not open)

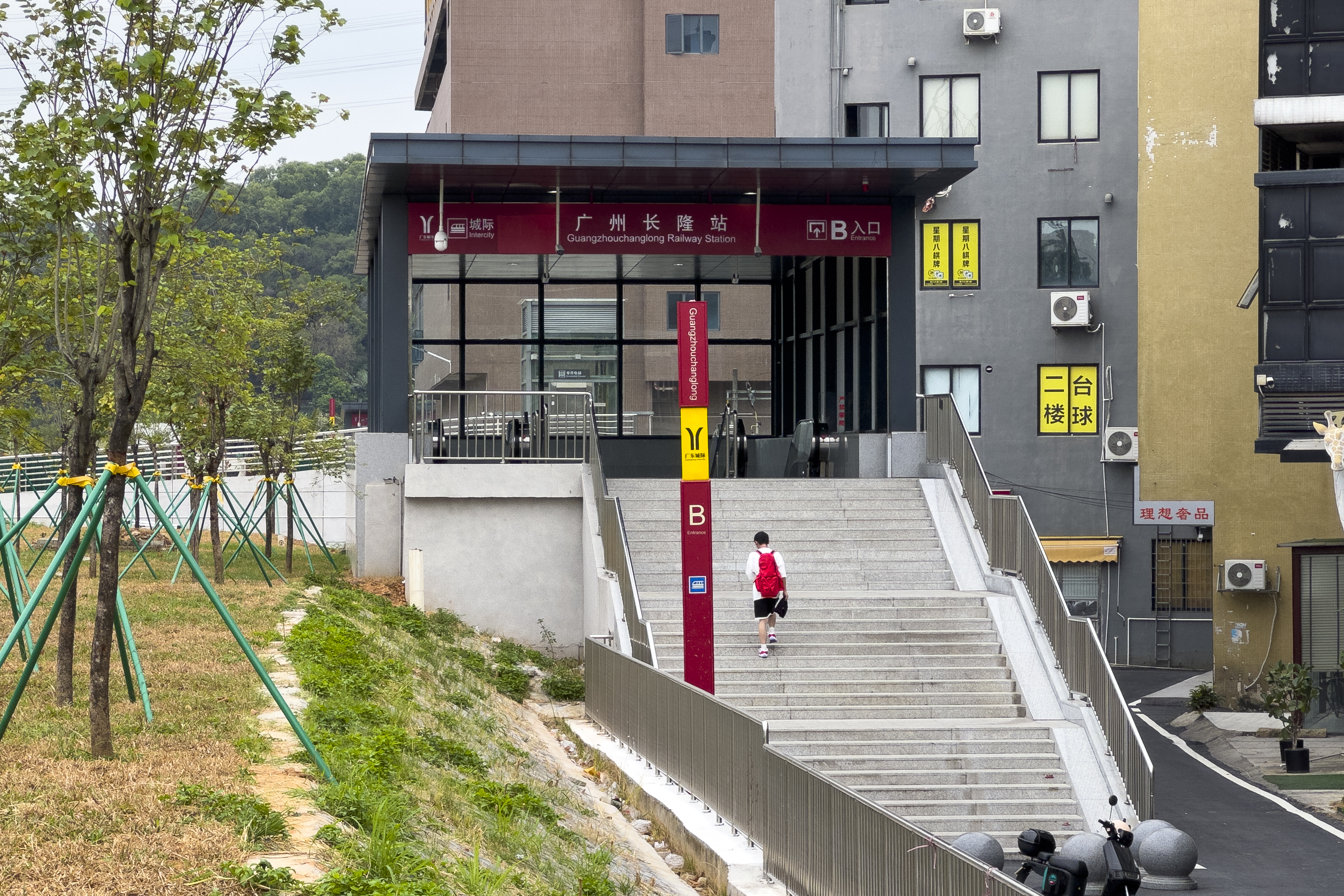
Entrance B

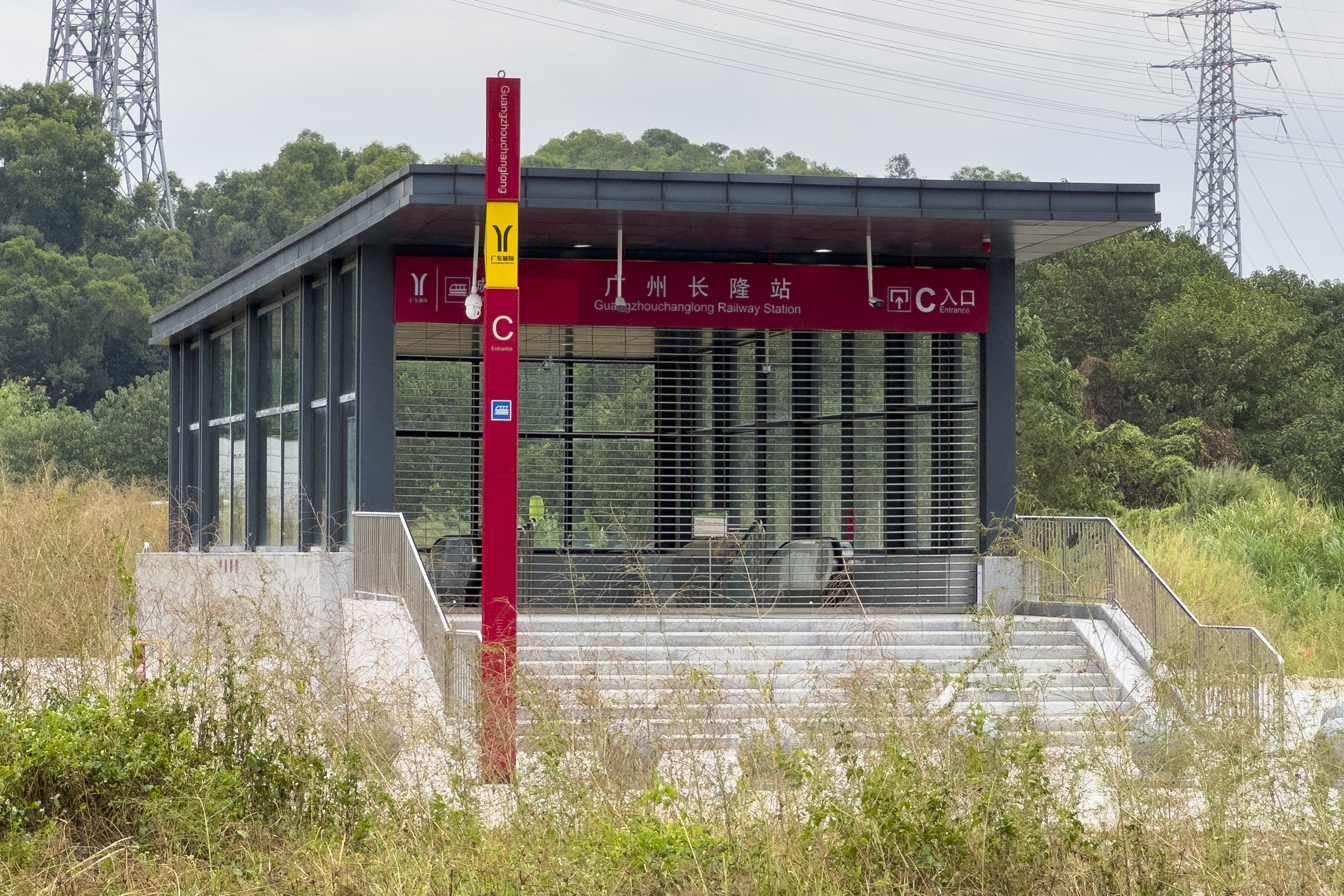
Entrance C (not open)

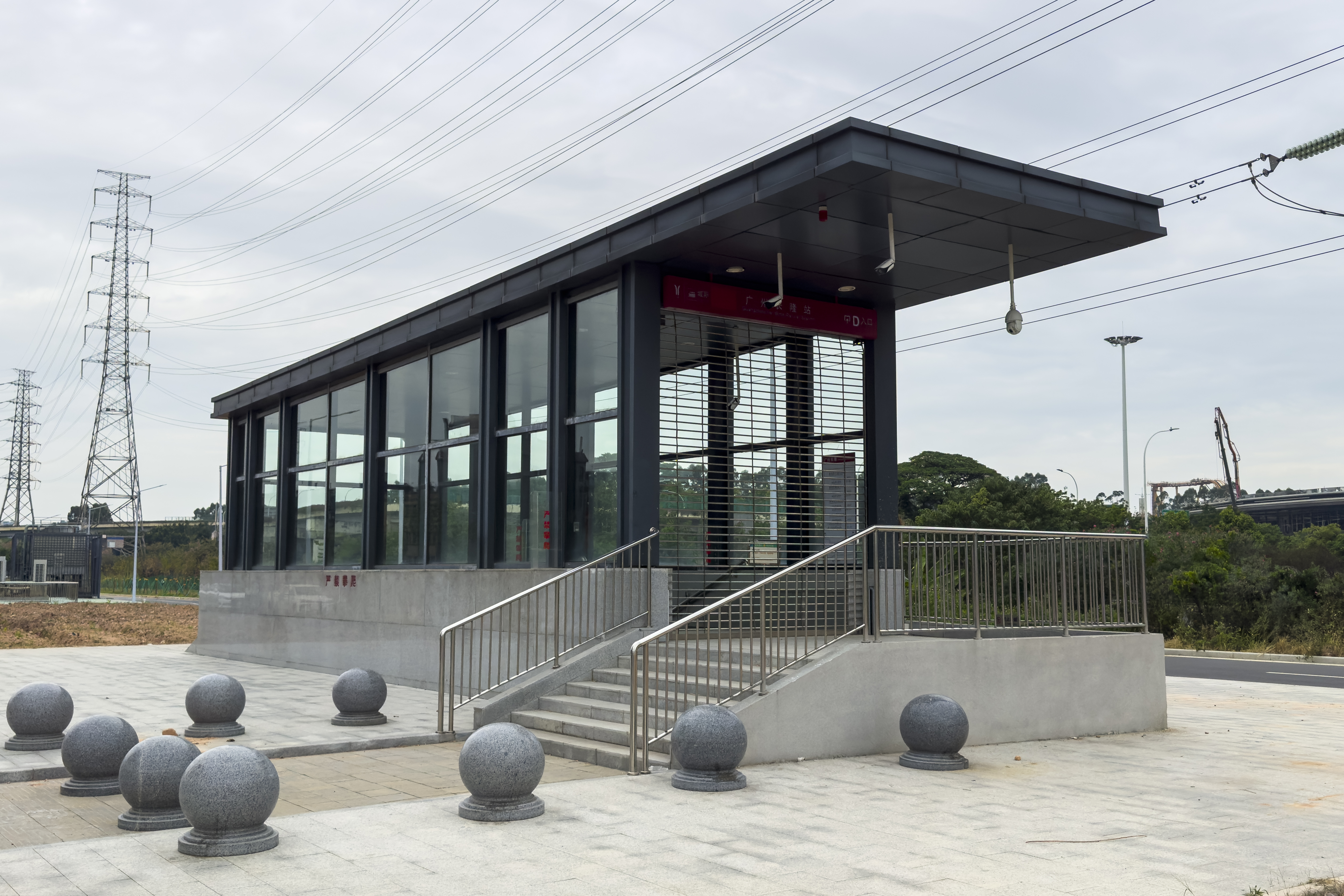
Entrance D (not open)

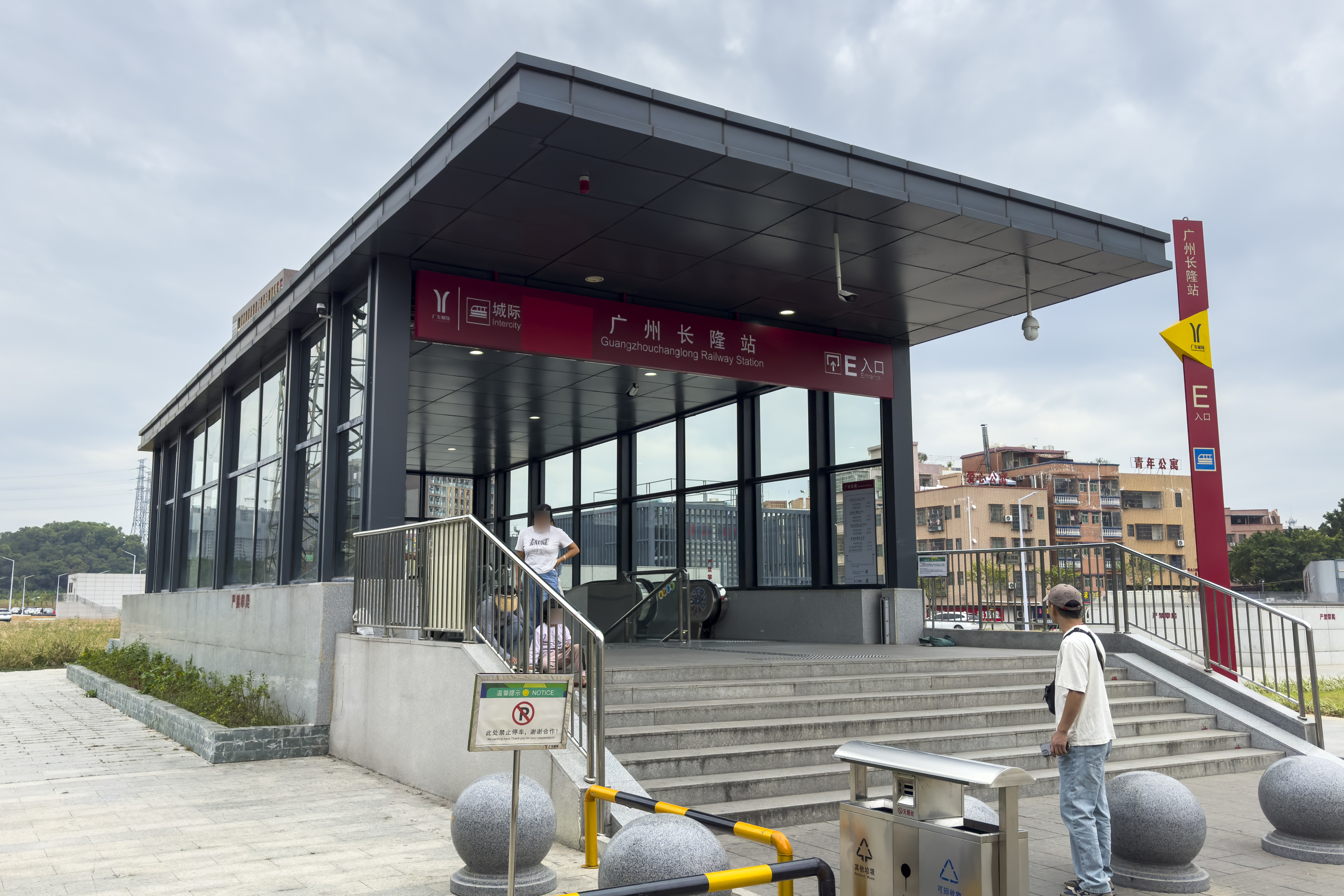
Entrance E

== Future Development ==
An underground interchange corridor between Hanxi Changlong metro station and Guangzhouchanglong railway station is under planning.
