= GQB =

GQB may refer to:

- GQB, Pinyin-derived acronym for 国务院侨务办公室 (Overseas Chinese Affairs Office), department in China
- Guerrilla Queer Bar, event organized by The Welcoming Committee, part of LGBTQ culture in Boston
- GQB, IEC 81346 code for a mechanical fan
- GQB, Pinyin code for the Guanqiao North railway station, China
