= Changlong =

Changlong may refer to:

- Chimelong Group, or Changlong in Chinese
- Changlong Subdistrict (长龙街道), Changsha County, Hunan province, China
- Changlung, or Changlong, a village in Gonjo County, Tibet Autonomous Region, China
- Changlong, the Chinese name of Chimelong Paradise

== See also ==
- Changlong Station (disambiguation)
