= Hanxi Changlong station =

Guangzhou Metro interchange station

Coordinates: 22.99306°N 113.33000°E

Hanxi Changlong 汉溪长隆
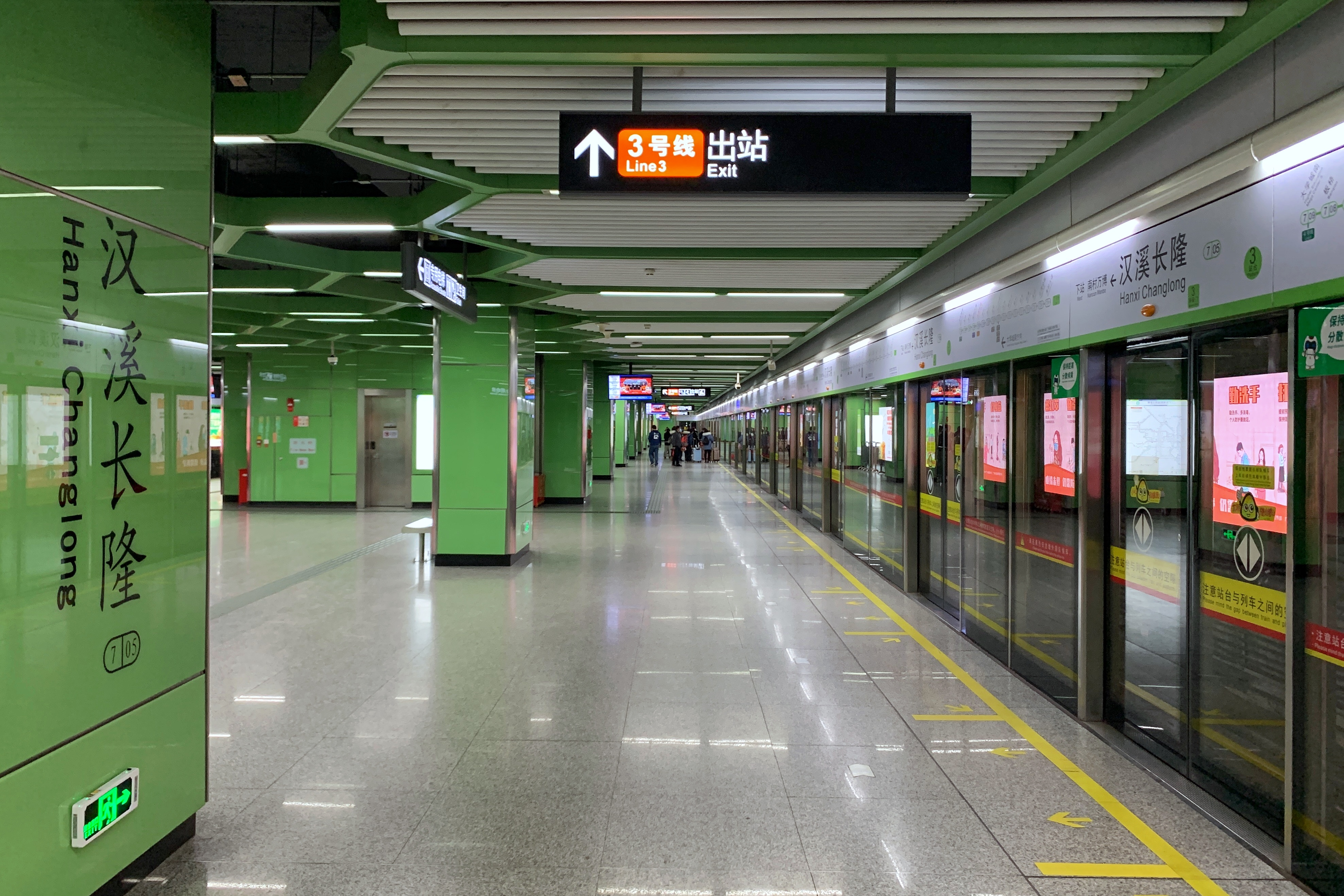
- Line 7 platform

Chinese name
- Simplified Chinese: 汉溪长隆站
- Traditional Chinese: 漢溪長隆站
Transcriptions
Standard Mandarin
- Hanyu Pinyin: Hànxī Chánglóng Zhàn
Yue: Cantonese
- Yale Romanization: Honkāi Chèuhnglùhng Jaahm
- Jyutping: Hon^{3}kai^{1} Coeng^{4}lung^{4} Zaam^{6}
- Hong Kong Romanization: Hon Kai Chimelong station

General information
- Location: Panyu District, Guangzhou, Guangdong; China
- Operator: Guangzhou Metro Co. Ltd.
- Lines: Line 3 Line 7
- Platforms: 4 (2 island platforms)
- Tracks: 4
- Connections: Guangzhou Changlong

Construction
- Structure type: Underground
- Accessible: Yes

Other information
- Station code: 303 705

History
- Opened: Line 3: 30 December 2006; 19 years ago Line 7: 28 December 2016; 9 years ago

Services
Preceding station	Guangzhou Metro	Following station
Shiqiao towards Haibang	Line 3	Dashi towards Airport North (Terminal 2) or Tianhe Coach Terminal
Zhongcun towards Meidi Dadao	Line 7	Nancun Wanbo towards Yanshan
Transfer at Guangzhou Changlong
Preceding station	Pearl River Delta Metropolitan Region Intercity Railway	Following station
Panyu Terminus	Guangzhou–Huizhou intercity railway transfer at Guangzhou Changlong	Donghuan towards Huizhou North
Location

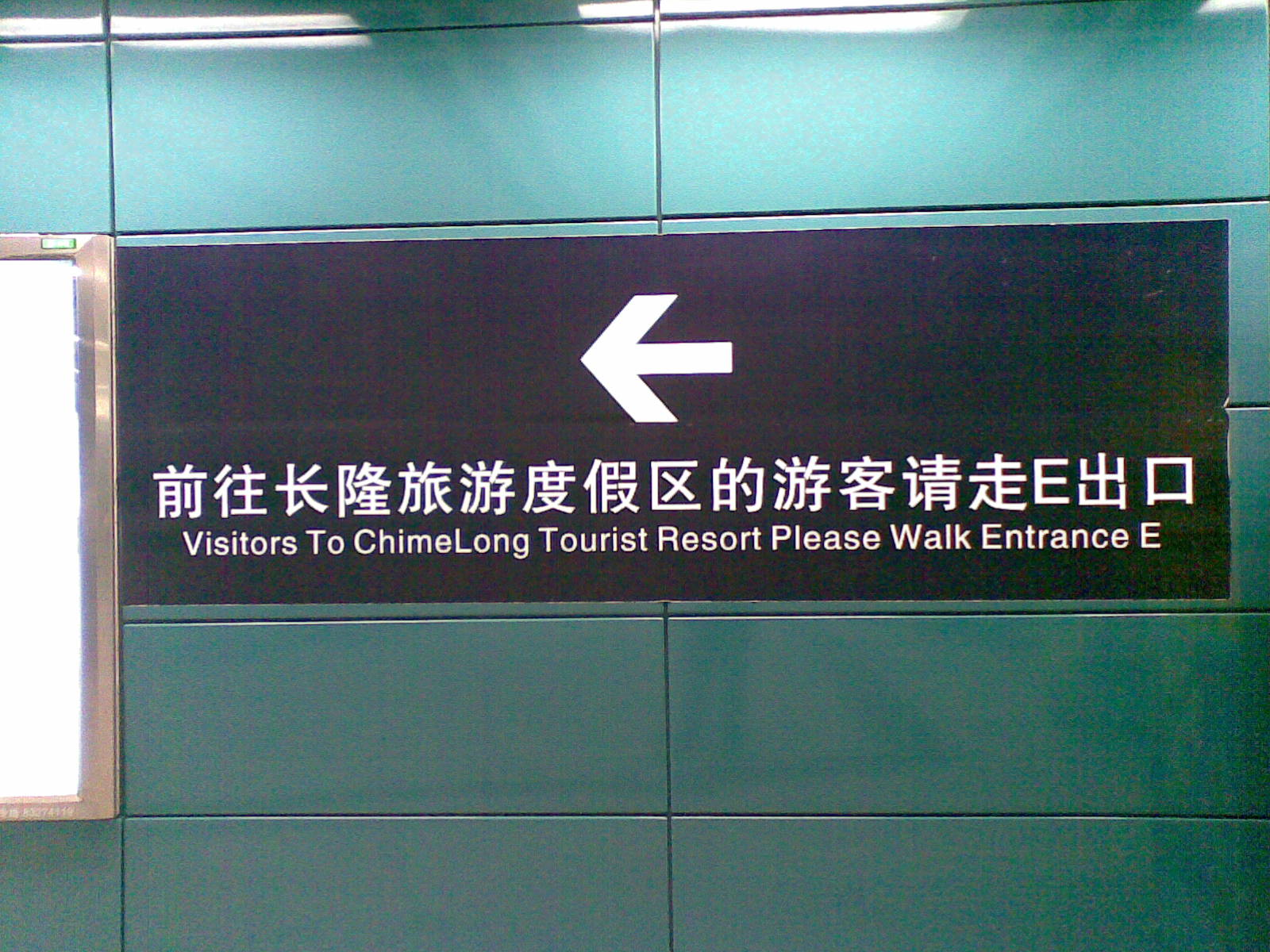
Sign pointing to Chimelong Tourist Resort

Hanxi Changlong Station (simplified Chinese: 汉溪长隆站; traditional Chinese: 漢溪長隆站; Cantonese Yale: Honkāi Chèuhnglùhng Jaahm) is an interchange station between Line 3 and Line 7 of the Guangzhou Metro. Line 3 started operation on 28 December 2006. Line 7 started operation on 28 December 2016. It is located under the east side of Hanxi Avenue (汉溪大道), Xinguang Expressway (新光快速公路), and the south of Chime-Long Paradise Amusement Park in Dashi Subdistrict (zh) of Panyu District of Guangzhou. There is a free shuttle bus connecting the station with the amusement park.

Before the station started operation, it was called "Hanxi Station" (汉溪站) and "Changlong Station" (长隆站) successively. The residents nearby were disappointed with the name "Changlong Station" because they felt that the name favoured the Chimelong Group, Chimelong Paradise's owner and operator. The Guangzhou Municipal Government later approved a change of name to "Hanxi Changlong Station" which satisfied both the residents and the enterprise.

== Station layout ==
B1; Concourse	Line 7 Lobby	Ticket Machines, Customer Service, Shops, Police Station, Safety Facilities, Exits D, E & G
B1; Concourse	Transfer Passageway	Transfer passageway between Lines 3 & 7
B1; Concourse	Line 3 Lobby	Ticket Machines, Customer Service, Shops, Police Station, Safety Facilities, Exit A
B2; Platforms	Buffer Area	Buffer area of Line 7
B2; Platforms	Platform 1	3 towards Haibang (Shiqiao)
B2; Platforms	Island platform, doors will open on the left
B2; Platforms	Platform 2	3 towards Tianhe Coach Terminal or Airport North (Dashi)
B3; Platforms	Platform 4	7 towards Meidi Dadao (Zhongcun)
B3; Platforms	Island platform, doors will open on the left
B3; Platforms	Platform 3	7 towards Yanshan (Nancun Wanbo)

== Gallery ==
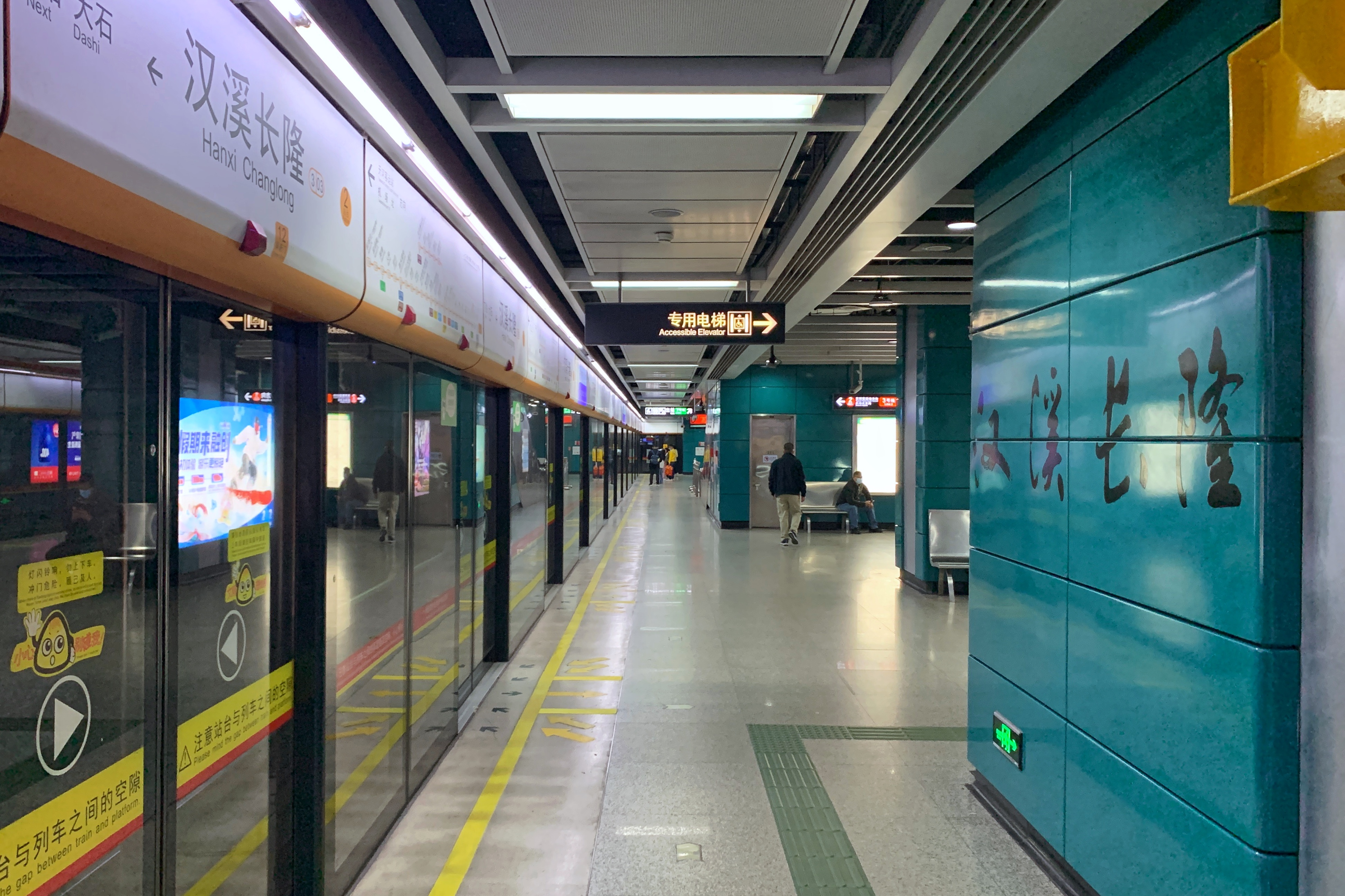
Platform 2 (Line 3 northbound platform)

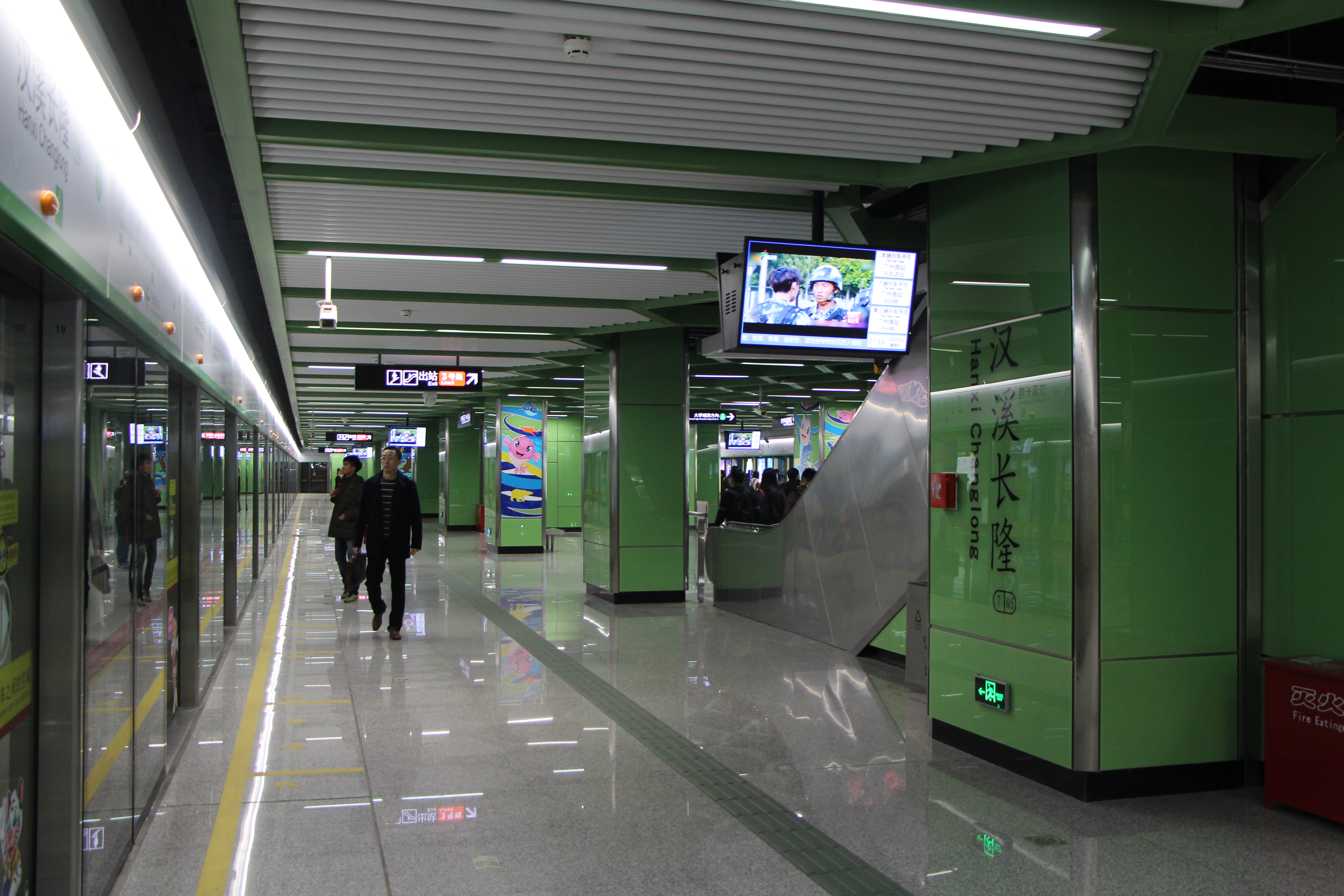
Platform 4 (Line 7 westbound platform)

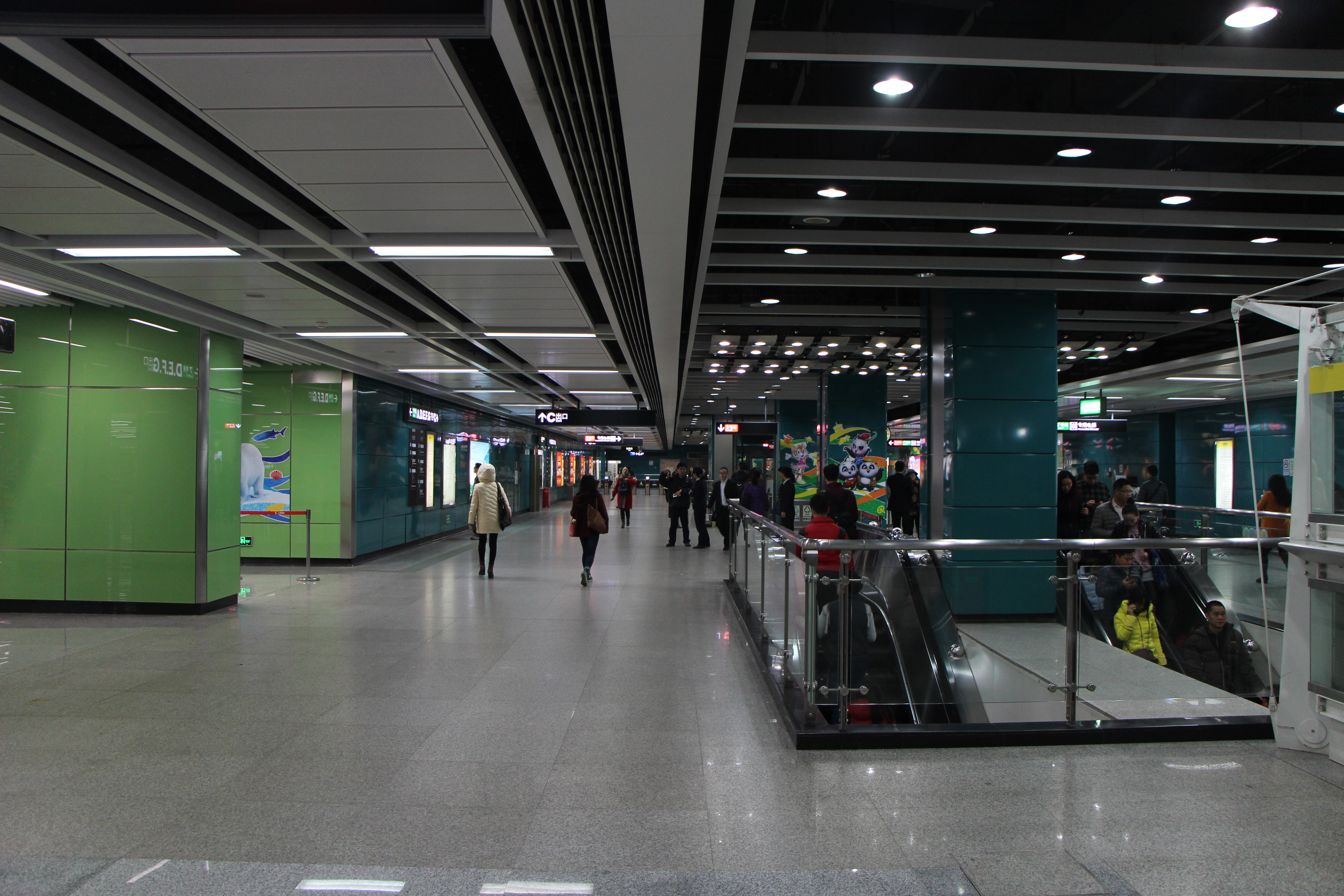
Line 3 concourse

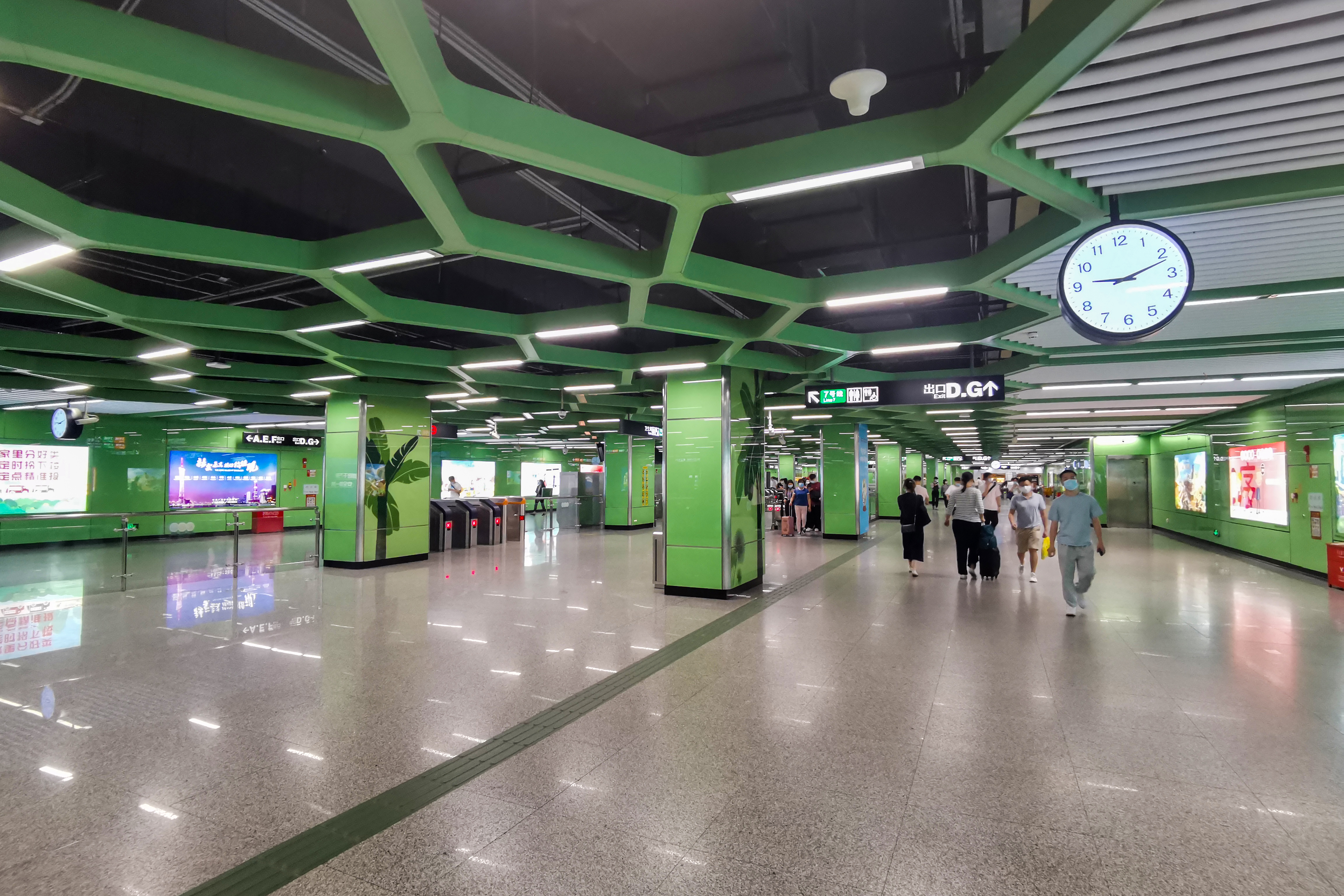
Line 7 concourse

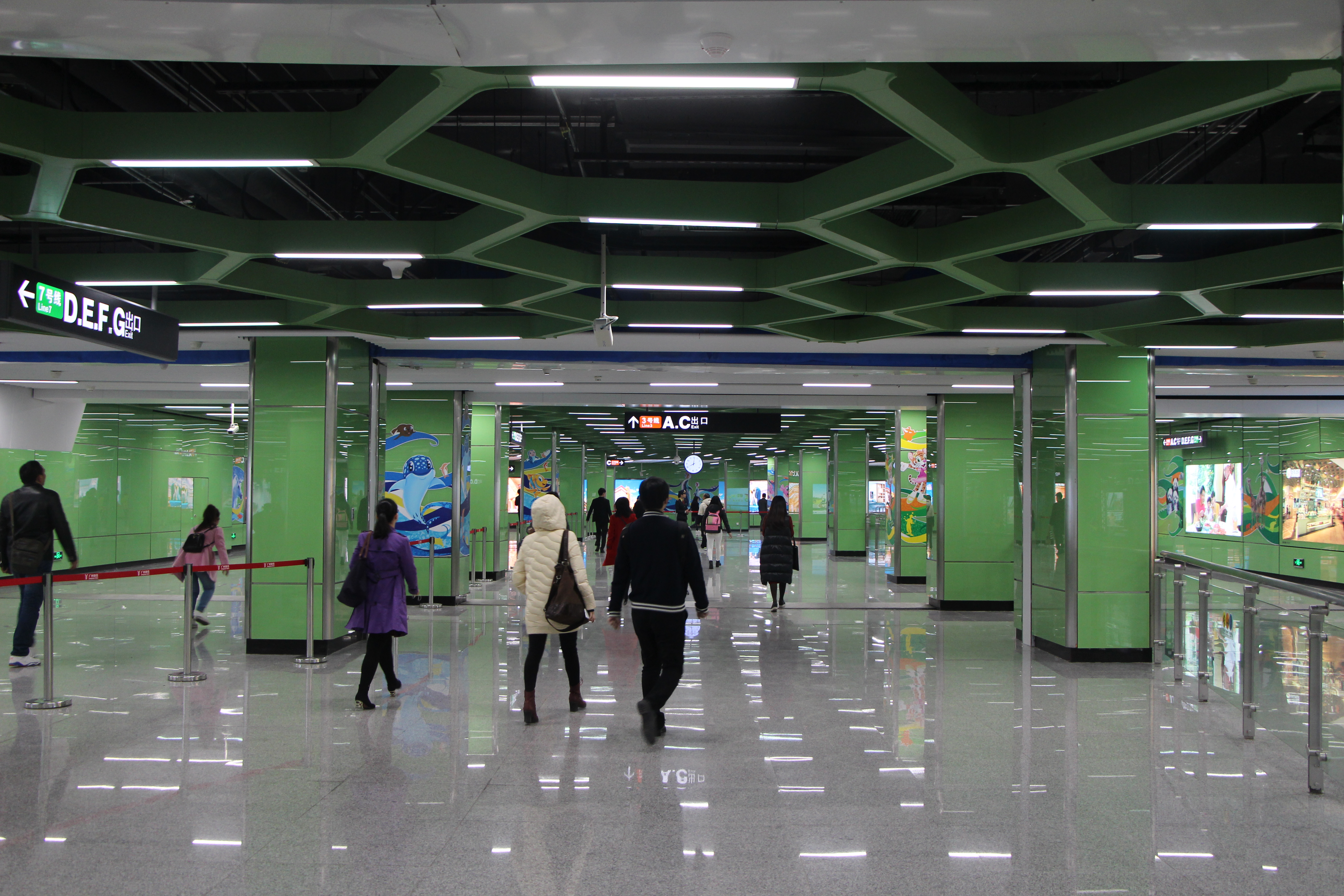
Paid transfer corridor

== See also ==
- Chimelong Paradise
