= Guanqiao station =

Future Guangzhou Metro station

Guanqiao 官桥
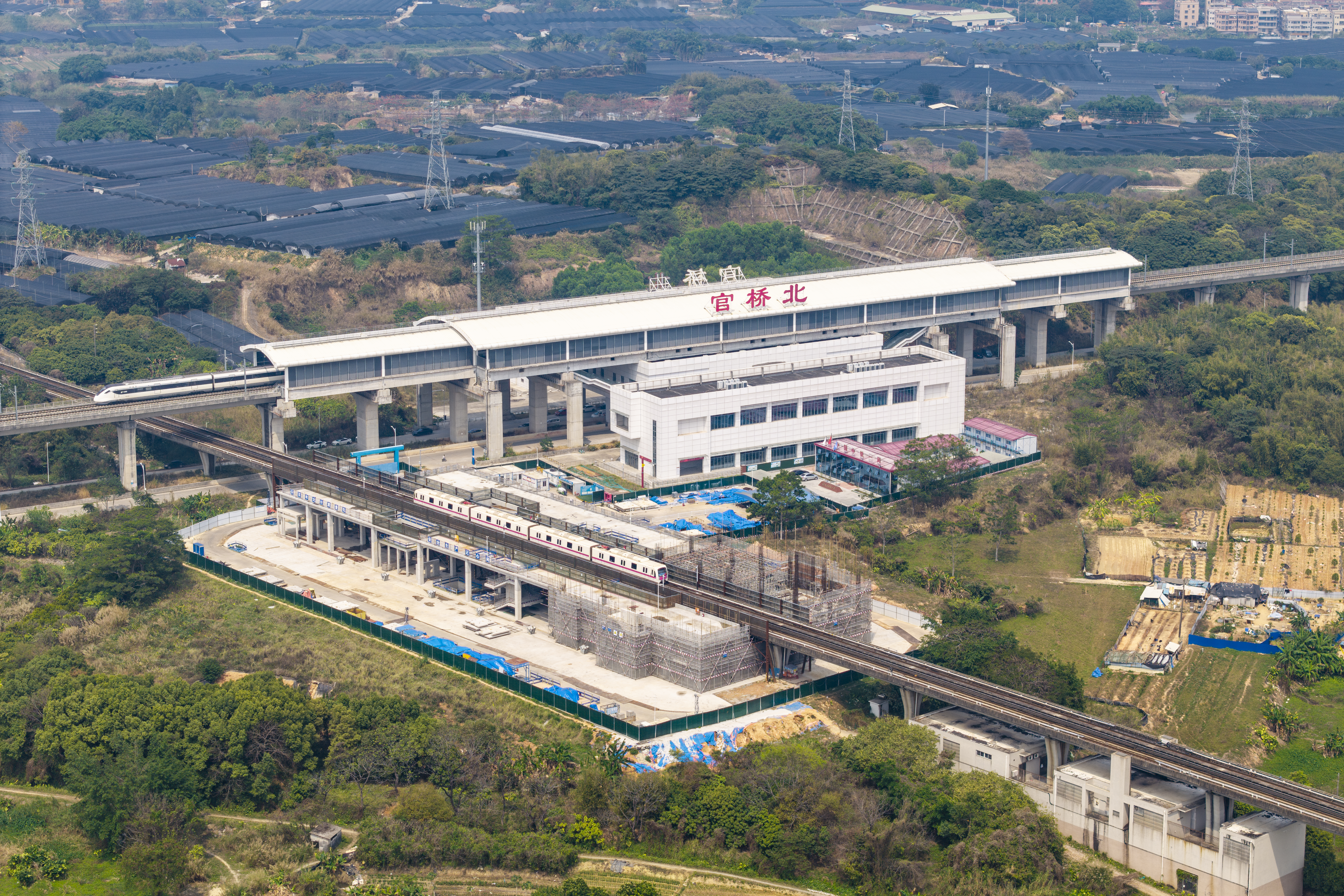
- Metro Guanqiao station under construction on the southwestern side of Guanqiao North railway station

Chinese name
- Simplified Chinese: 官桥站
- Traditional Chinese: 官橋站
Transcriptions
Standard Mandarin
- Hanyu Pinyin: Guānqiáo Zhàn
Yue: Cantonese
- Yale Romanization: Gūnkìuh Jaahm
- Jyutping: gun^{1} kiu^{4} zaam^{6}
- Hong Kong Romanization: Kwun Kiu station

General information
- Location: Intersection of Lianhua Road (莲花路) and planning Lianhua Avenue (莲花大道); Border of Shilou and Shiqi, Panyu District, Guangzhou, Guangdong; China
- Coordinates: 22.983511°N 113.438881°E
- Operated by: Guangzhou Metro Co. Ltd.
- Line: Line 4
- Platforms: 2 (2 side platforms)
- Tracks: 2
- Connections: Guanqiao North

Construction
- Structure type: Elevated
- Accessible: Yes

Other information
- Station code: 416

History
- Opening: 2026

Services
Preceding station	Guangzhou Metro	Following station
Line 4 does not stop here
Future services (2026)
Xinzao towards Huangcun	Line 4	Shiqi towards Nansha Passenger Port
Transfer at Guanqiao North
Preceding station	Pearl River Delta Metropolitan Region Intercity Railway	Following station
Donghuan towards Panyu	Guangzhou–Huizhou intercity railway	Guangzhou Lianhuashan towards Huizhou North
Location

Guanqiao station (simplified Chinese: 官桥站; traditional Chinese: 官橋站; pinyin: Guānqiáo Zhàn; Cantonese Yale: Gūnkìuh Jaahm) is a future elevated station of Line 4 of the Guangzhou Metro. It will be located at Guanqiao Village (Chinese: 官桥村), Shilou Town (Chinese: 石楼镇), Panyu District, Guangzhou. The station began construction in December 2023 and will be completed by the end of 2026.

== History ==
This station was originally a reserved station on Line 4. Because most of the surrounding areas of the station are farmland and there is no road to connect with the outside world, the station was not built simultaneously with Line 4, therefore only the equipment required for the signal system was installed at the predetermined location of the station, and no civil facilities for the station were reserved.

As construction of the Guangzhou–Huizhou intercity railway neared completion, the station started planning construction around 2020 to channel passengers onto the intercity line. The preliminary design estimate for the station project was approved in February 2021. The station was originally scheduled to start construction in the second half of 2021 and be completed and opened in 2024. As a result, the parties issued a supervision tender in October of the same year but suspended the tender ahead of schedule in March 2022. In May 2022, the construction bidding supervision bidding was restarted again. In September 2022, the relevant person in charge said in response to media and public inquiries that the station has completed the bidding for the project and is carrying out preliminary work such as land acquisition, planning and construction approval.

In February 2024, the construction of the steel structure of the station began.

== See also ==
- Guanqiao North railway station (官桥北站), an intercity rail station opened on 26 May 2024
