= Zhongcun station (Guangzhou Metro) =

Guangzhou Metro station

Coordinates: 22.986437°N 113.31698°E

Zhongcun 钟村
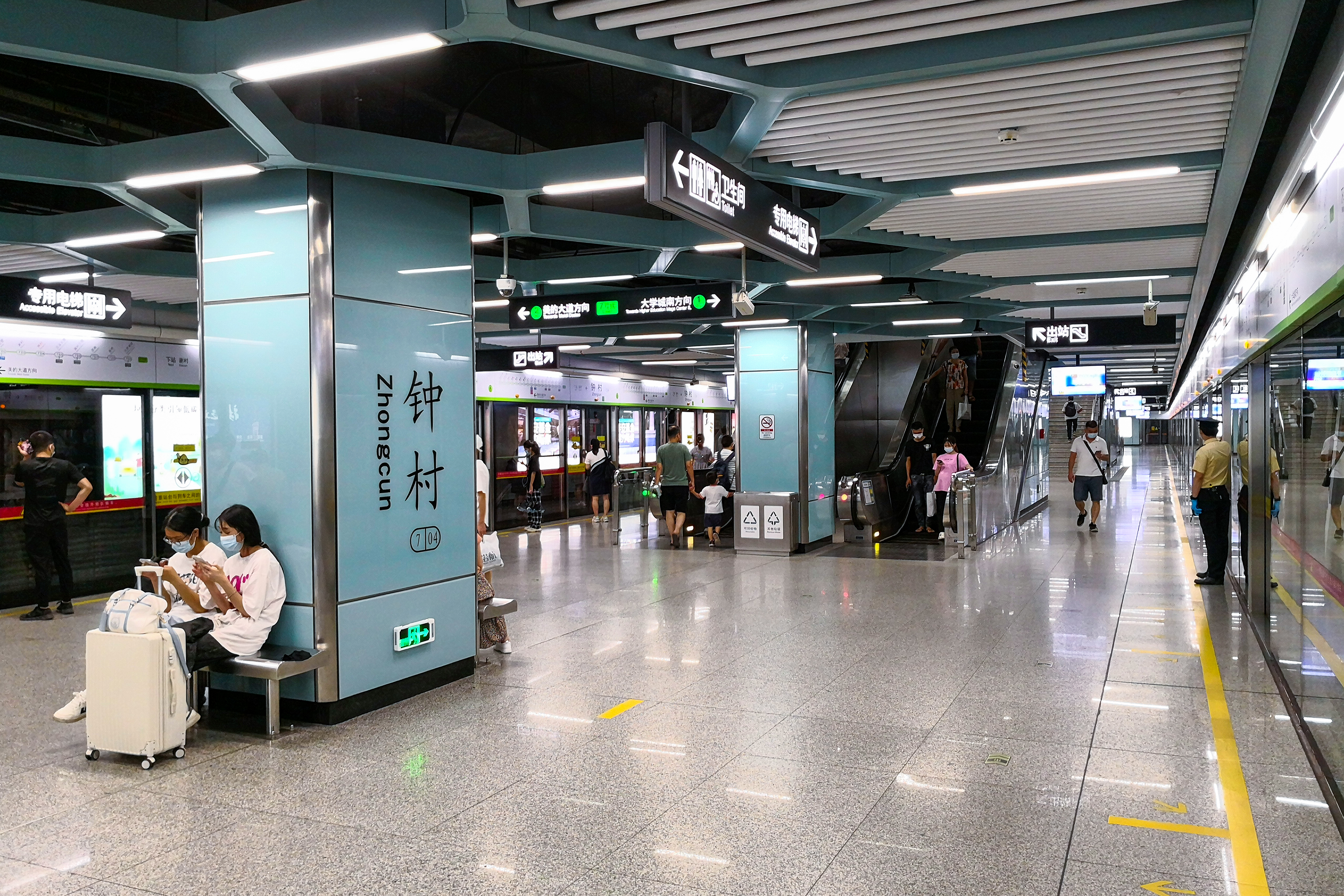

Chinese name
- Simplified Chinese: 钟村站
- Traditional Chinese: 锺村站
Transcriptions
Standard Mandarin
- Hanyu Pinyin: Zhōngcūn Zhàn
Yue: Cantonese
- Jyutping: zung^{1}cyun^{1} zaam^{6}

General information
- Location: interchange of Hanxi Avenue East (汉溪大道) and Shiguang Road (市广路); Panyu District, Guangzhou, Guangdong; China
- Operated by: Guangzhou Metro Co. Ltd.
- Line: Line 7
- Platforms: 2 (1 island platform)

Construction
- Structure type: Underground

Other information
- Station code: 704

History
- Opened: 28 December 2016; 9 years ago

Services
Preceding station	Guangzhou Metro	Following station
Xiecun towards Meidi Dadao	Line 7	Hanxi Changlong towards Yanshan
Location

Zhongcun station (Chinese: 钟村站) is a station of Line 7 of the Guangzhou Metro. It started operations on 28 December 2016.

== Station layout ==
G	Street level	Exit
L1; Concourse	Lobby	Customer Service, Vending Machines, Security Office
L2; Platforms	Platform 2	7 towards Meidi Dadao (Xiecun)
L2; Platforms	Island platform, doors will open on the left
L2; Platforms	Platform 1	7 towards Yanshan (Hanxi Changlong)

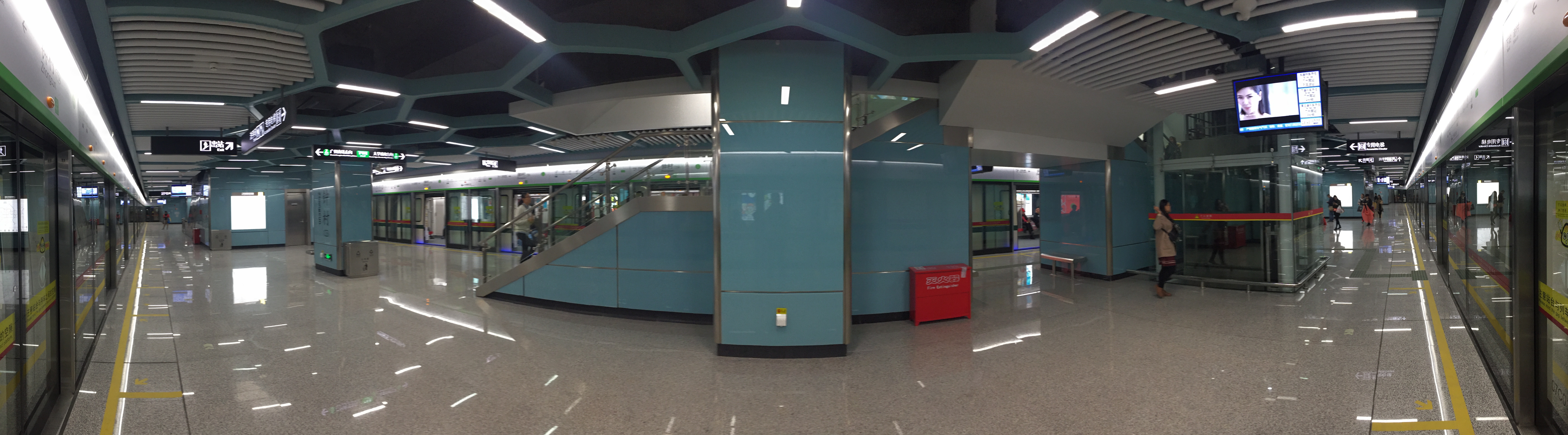
Platform 2

== Exits ==
Zhongcun station has 4 points of entry/exit, with Exit A1 being accessible via elevator.

- A1: Hanxi Avenue East
- A2: Hanxi Avenue East
- C1: Hanxi Avenue East
- C2: Hanxi Avenue East
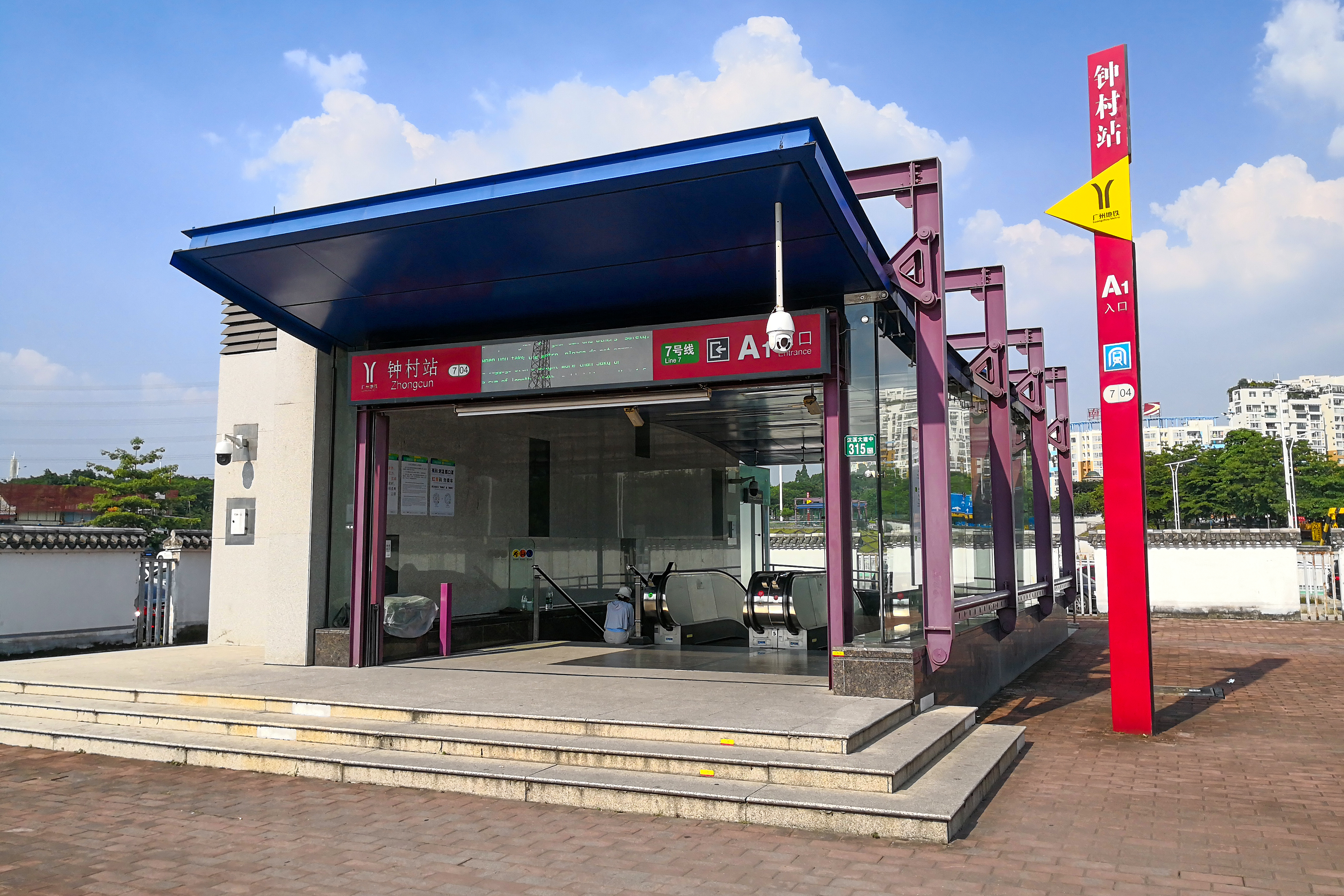
Exit A1

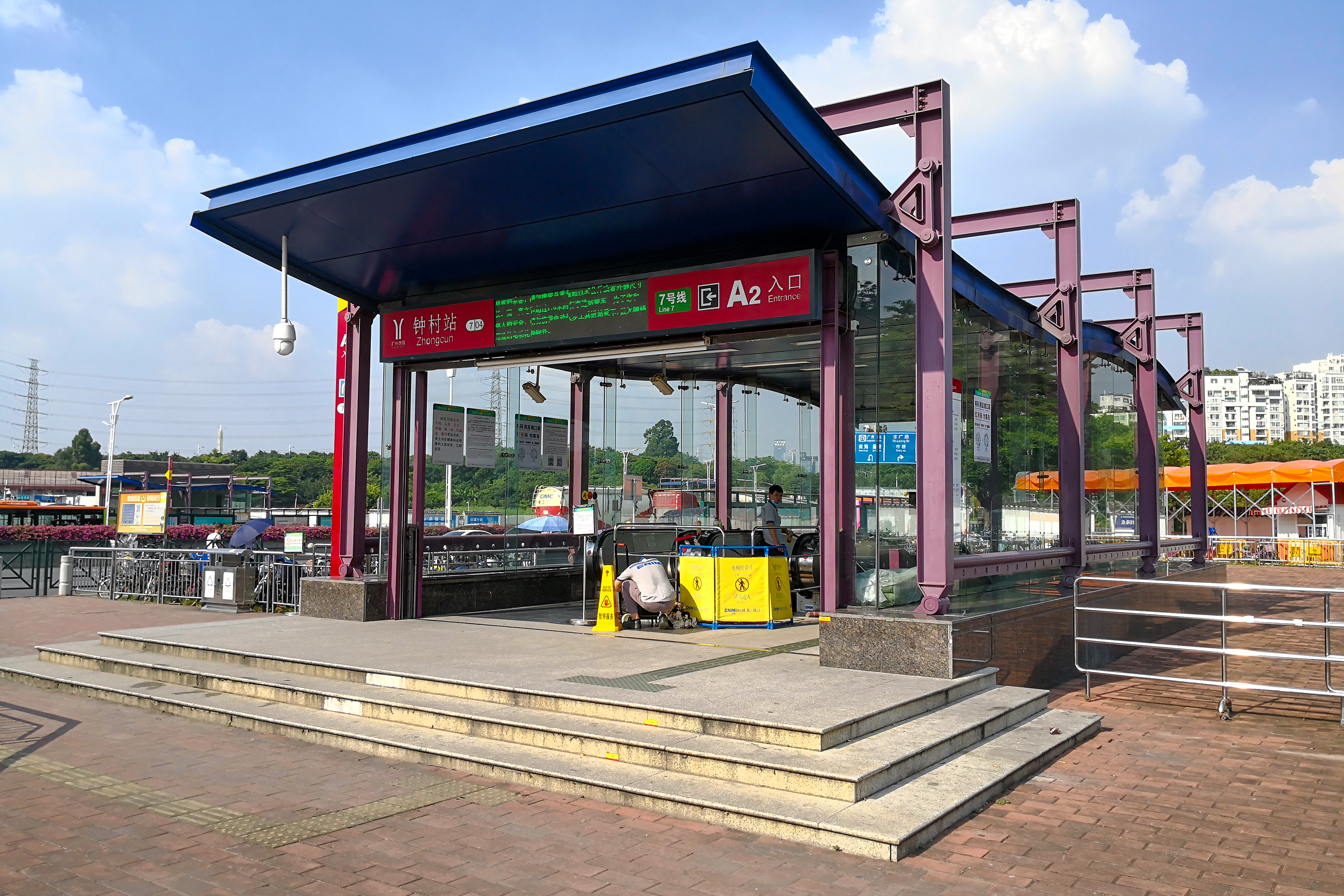
Exit A2

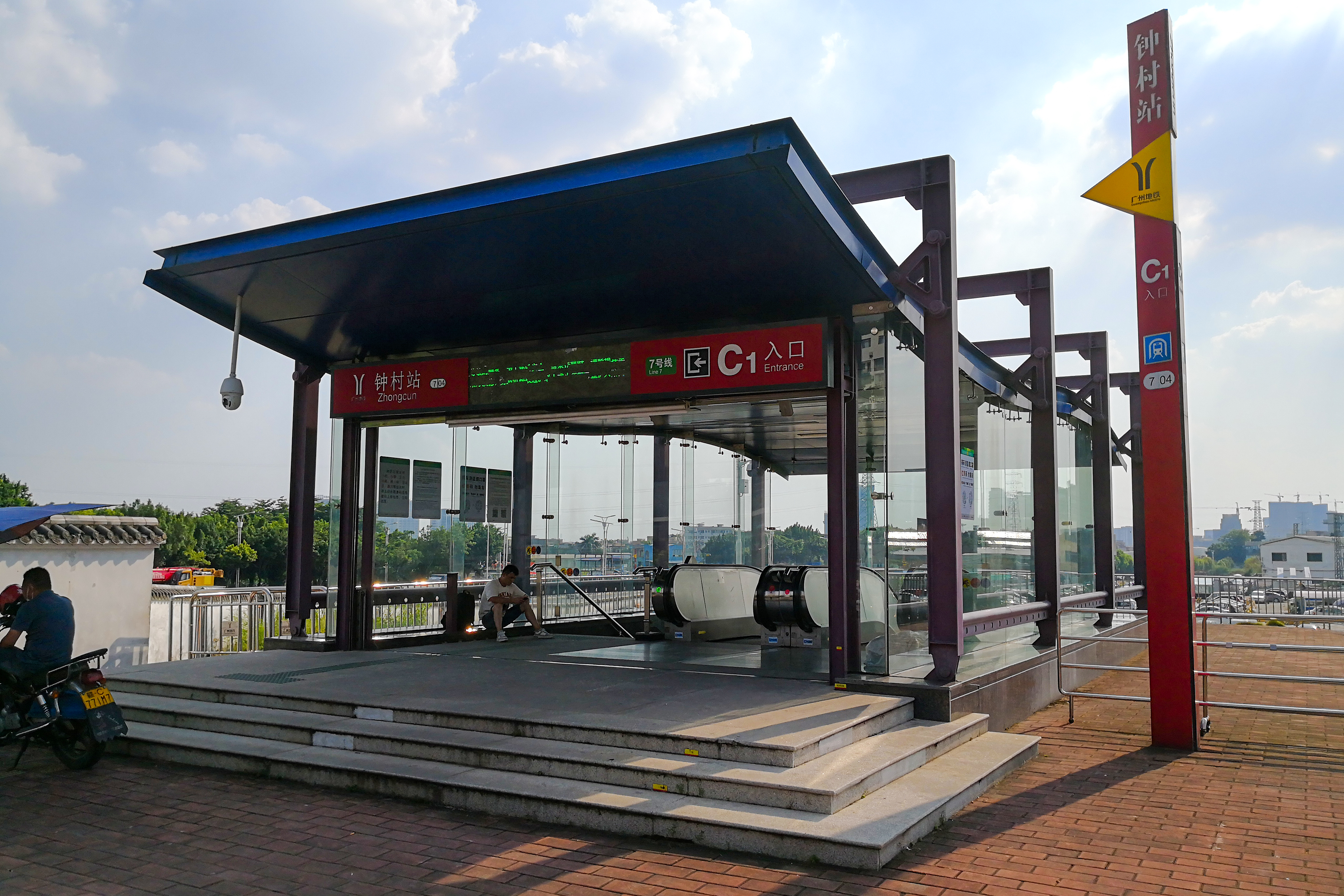
Exit C1

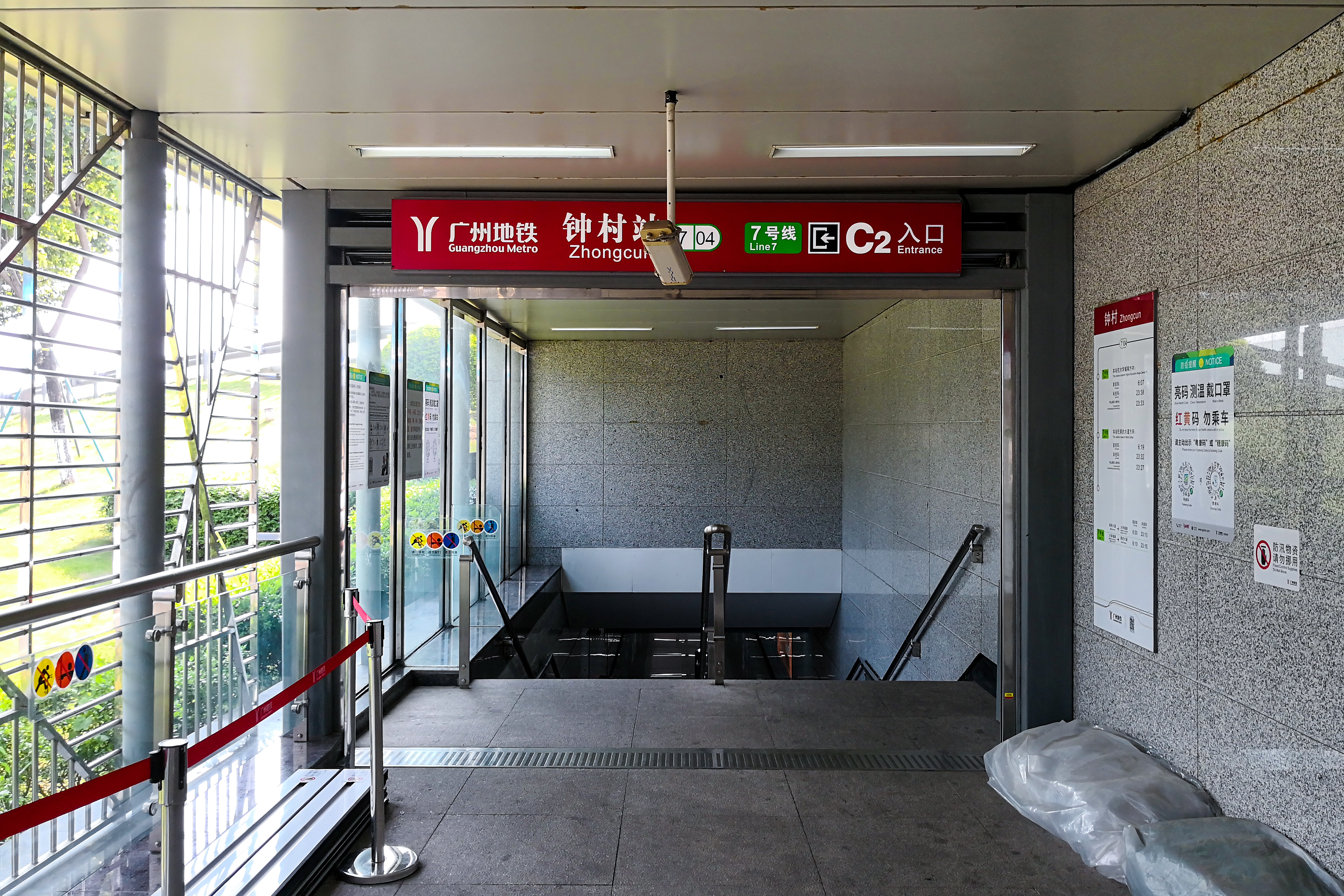
Exit C2

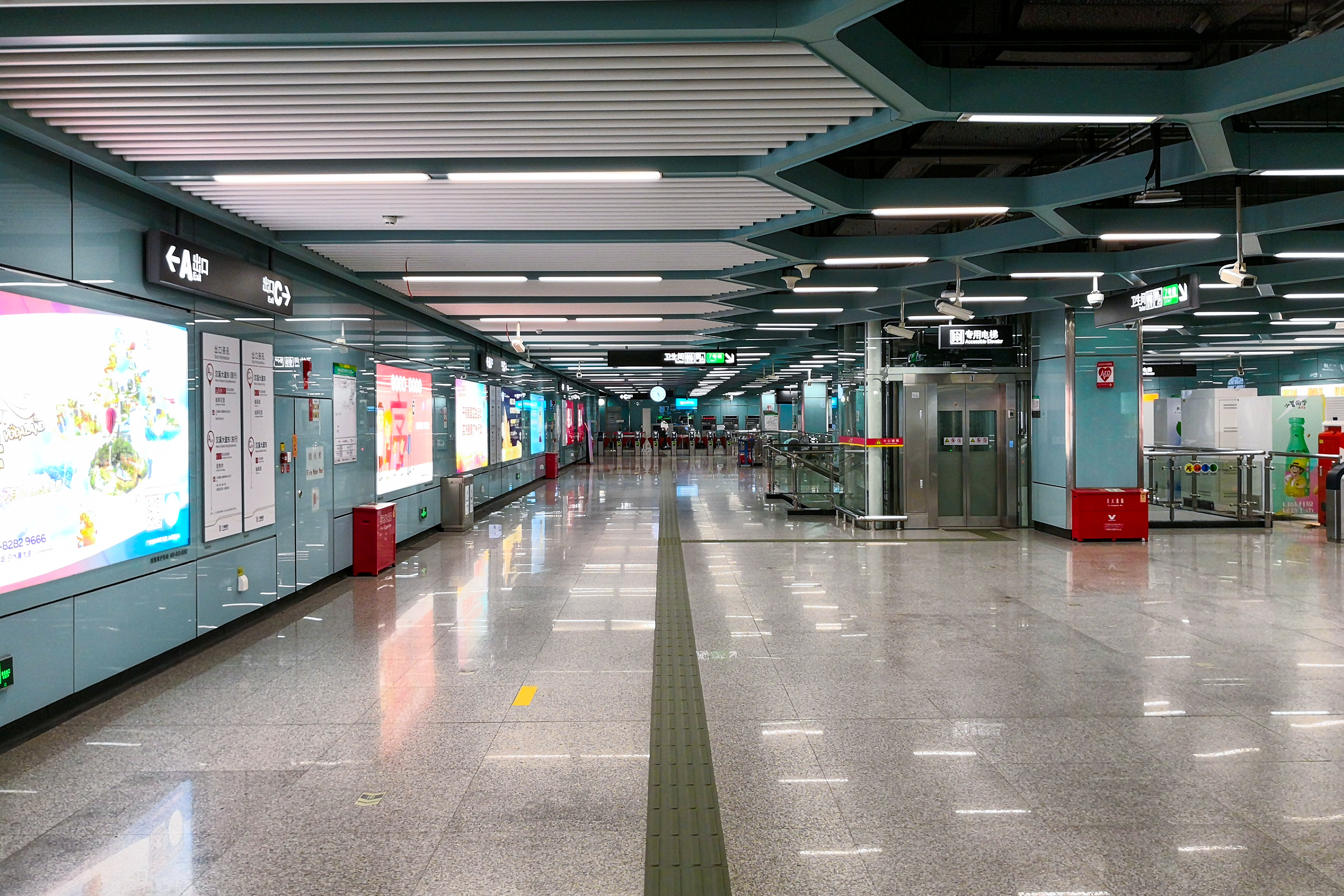
Concourse
