= Shiqiao station (Guangzhou Metro) =

Guangzhou Metro station

Coordinates: 22.949743°N 113.361726°E

Shiqiao 市桥
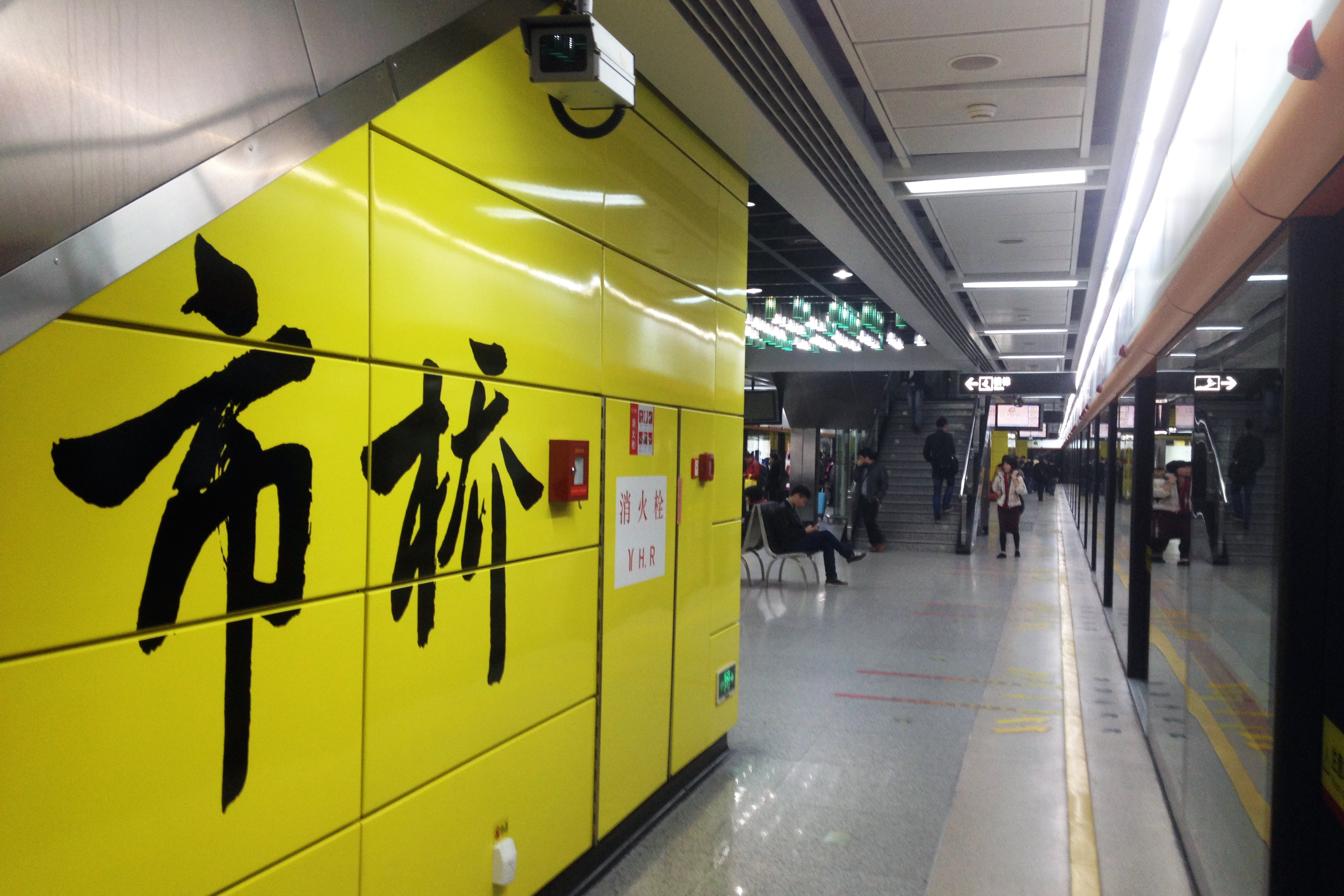

Chinese name
- Simplified Chinese: 市桥站
- Traditional Chinese: 市橋站
- Postal: Shi Kiu station
- Literal meaning: City Bridge Station
Transcriptions
Standard Mandarin
- Hanyu Pinyin: Shìqiáo Zhàn
Yue: Cantonese
- Yale Romanization: Síhkìuh Jaahm
- Jyutping: Si^{5}kiu^{4} Zaam^{6}

General information
- Location: Panyu District, Guangzhou, Guangdong; China
- Operated by: Guangzhou Metro Co. Ltd.
- Line: Line 3
- Platforms: 2 (1 island platform)

Construction
- Structure type: Underground

Other information
- Station code: 302

History
- Opened: 30 December 2006; 19 years ago

Services
Preceding station	Guangzhou Metro	Following station
Panyu Square towards Haibang	Line 3	Hanxi Changlong towards Airport North (Terminal 2) or Tianhe Coach Terminal
Location

Shiqiao Station (simplified Chinese: 市桥站; traditional Chinese: 市橋站; Cantonese Yale: Síhkìuh Jaahm; lit. 'City Bridge Station') is a station of Line 3 of the Guangzhou Metro. It started operations on 28 December 2006. It is located at the underground of the junction of Guangming Road North and Qiaoxing Avenue, Shiqiao Subdistrict, in Panyu District, Guangzhou.

== Station layout ==
G	Street level	Exit
L1; Concourse	Lobby	Customer Service, Shops, Vending machines, ATMs
L2; Platforms	Platform 1	3 towards Haibang (Panyu Square)
L2; Platforms	Island platform, doors will open on the left
L2; Platforms	Platform 2	3 towards Tianhe Coach Terminal or Airport North (Hanxi Changlong)

== Exits ==
Exit number	Exit location
Exit A	Qiaoxing Dadao
Exit B	Guangming Beilu
Exit C	Guangming Beilu
Exit D	Qiaoxing Dadao
