= Guanqiao North railway station =

Guangdong Intercity railway station in Guangzhou, China

Guanqiaobei 官桥北
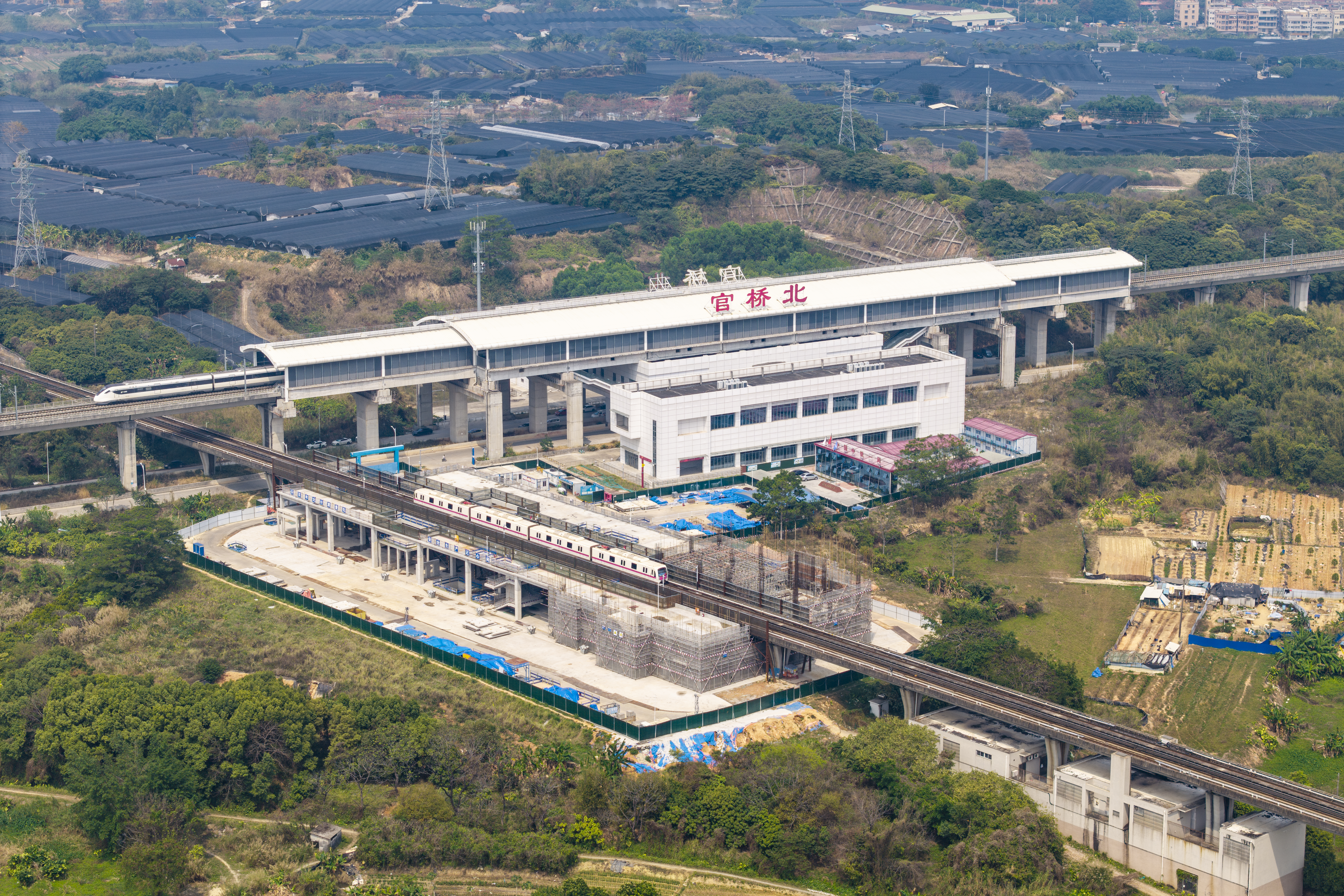
- Exterior

Chinese name
- Simplified Chinese: 官桥北站
- Traditional Chinese: 官橋北站
Transcriptions
Standard Mandarin
- Hanyu Pinyin: Guānqiáo Běi Zhàn
Yue: Cantonese
- Yale Romanization: Gūnkìuh Bāk Jaahm
- Jyutping: Gun^{1}kiu^{4} Bak^{1} Zaam^{6}

General information
- Location: Lianhua Boulevard, Guanqiao Estate (East of Guanqiao), Shilou, Panyu, Guangzhou, Guangdong; China
- Coordinates: 22°59′4.74″N 113°26′21.44″E
- Owner: Pearl River Delta Metropolitan Region intercity railway
- Operator: Guangdong Intercity
- Line: Guangzhou–Huizhou intercity railway
- Platforms: 2 (2 side platforms)
- Tracks: 2
- Connections: 4 Guanqiao (2026)

Construction
- Structure type: Elevated
- Accessible: Yes

Other information
- Station code: GQA (Pinyin: GQB)

History
- Opened: 26 May 2024 (2 years ago)

Services
Preceding station	Pearl River Delta Metropolitan Region Intercity Railway	Following station
Donghuan towards Panyu	Guangzhou–Huizhou intercity railway	Guangzhou Lianhuashan towards Huizhou North
Location

Guanqiao North railway station (Chinese: 官桥北站; pinyin: Guānqiáo Běi Zhàn; Cantonese Yale: Gūnkìuh Bāk Jaahm) is a railway station on Guangzhou–Huizhou intercity railway located in Panyu, Guangzhou, Guangdong, China. The station opened on 26 May 2024.

== Entrances/exits ==
The station has 3 points of entry/exit, lettered A, B1 and B2. Only Exit A is open, it is accessible via elevator.

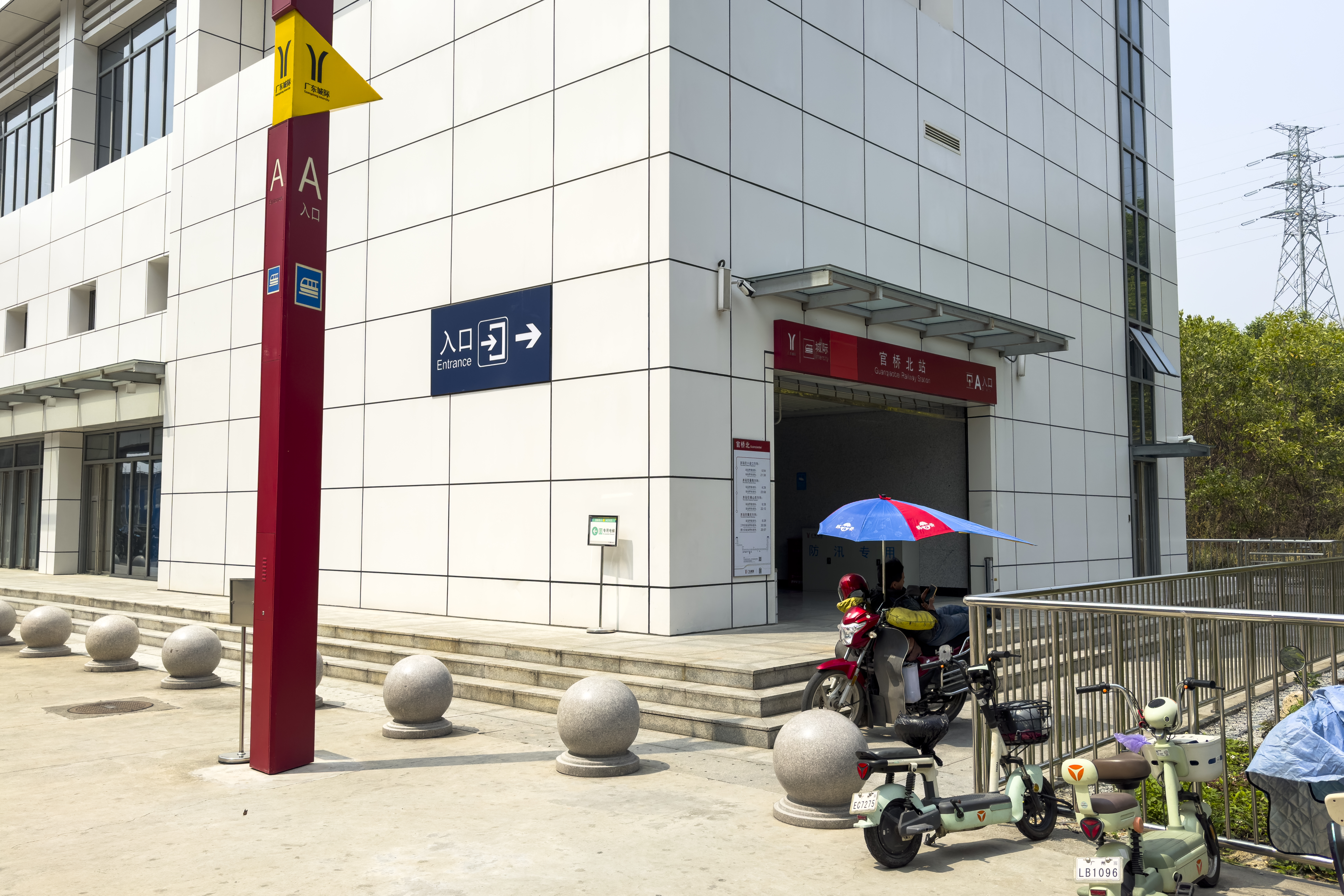
Entrance A

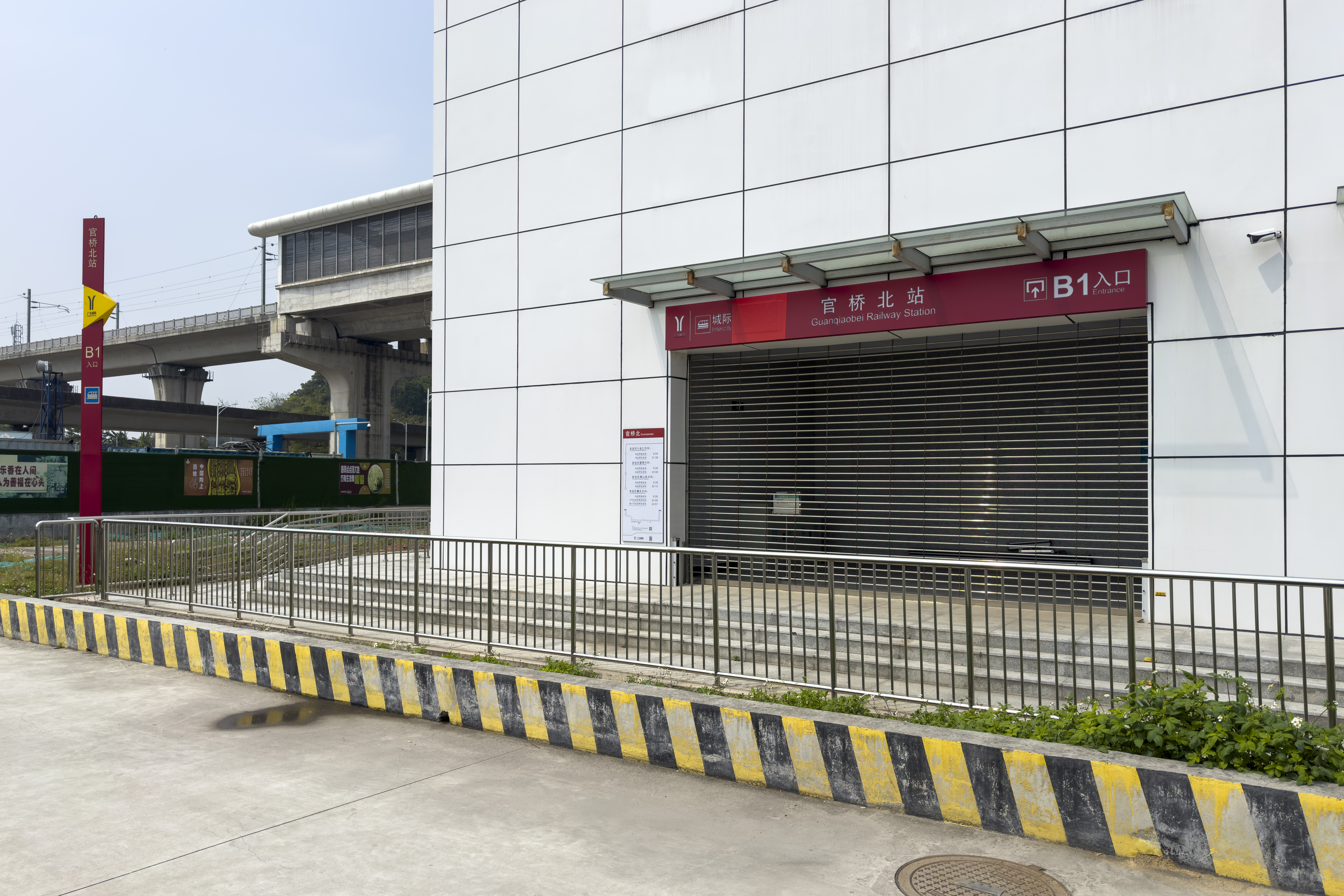
Entrance B1 (not open)

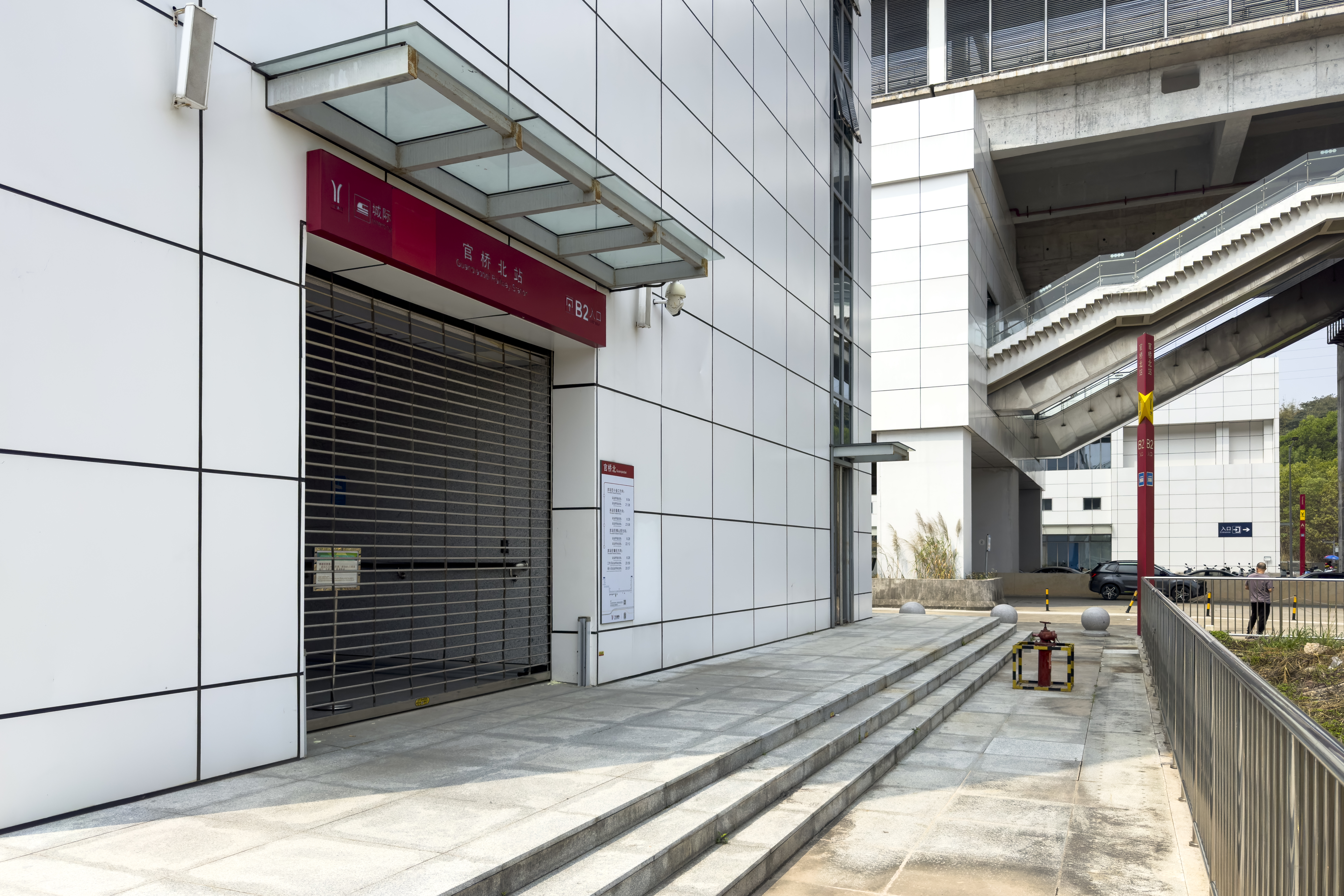
Entrance B2 (not open)

== History ==
The station was originally called Guanqiao, but was later changed to Guanqiao North Station in order to avoid the same name as Guanqiao Station located in Tengzhou City, Zaozhuang, Shandong province on the Beijing–Shanghai railway.

== Future development ==
The future Guanqiao station reserved for Guangzhou Metro Line 4 will be built on the west side of the station, and an overpass will be built to connect it to the station. The metro station is expected to open by the end of 2026.

== Gallery ==
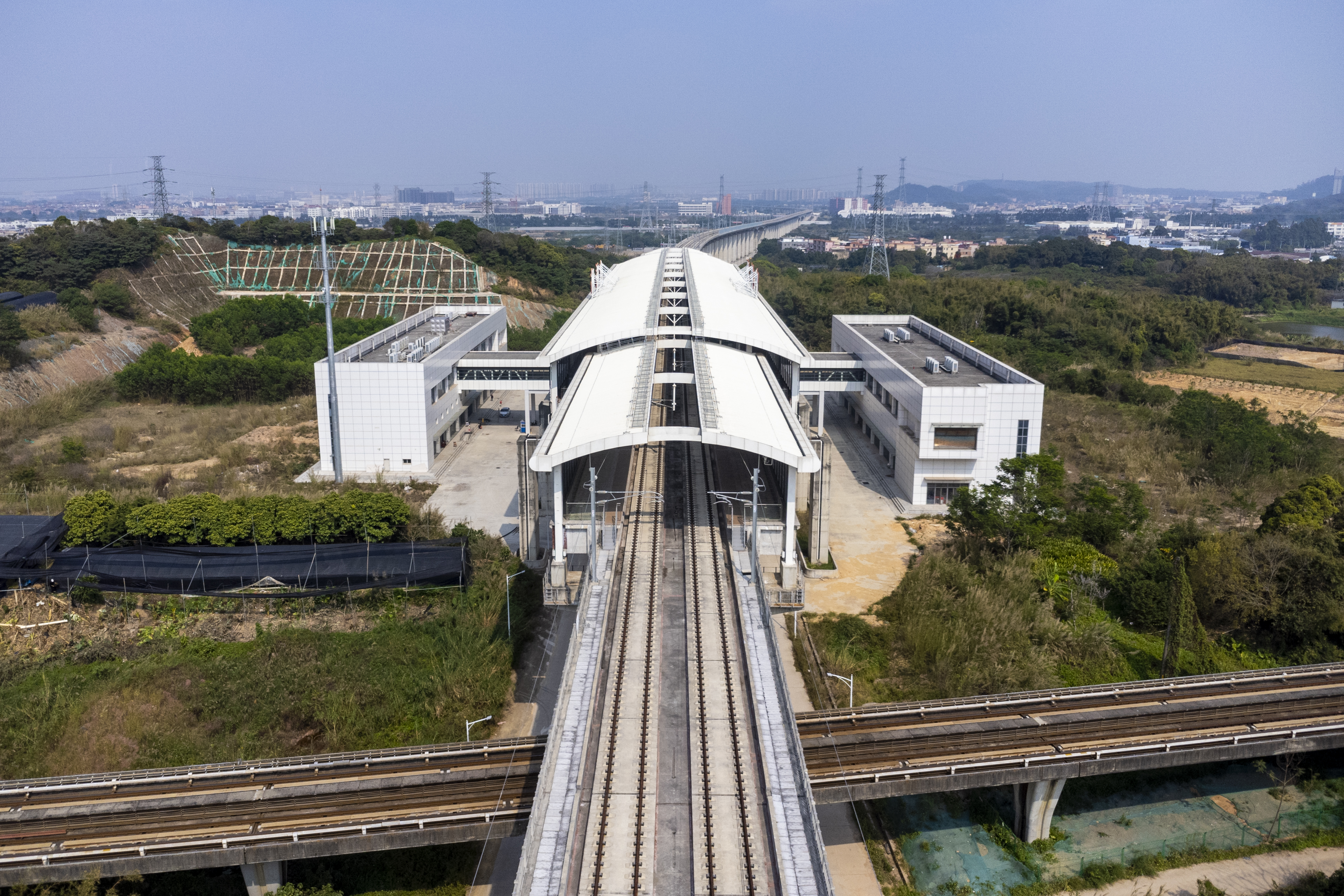
Track area

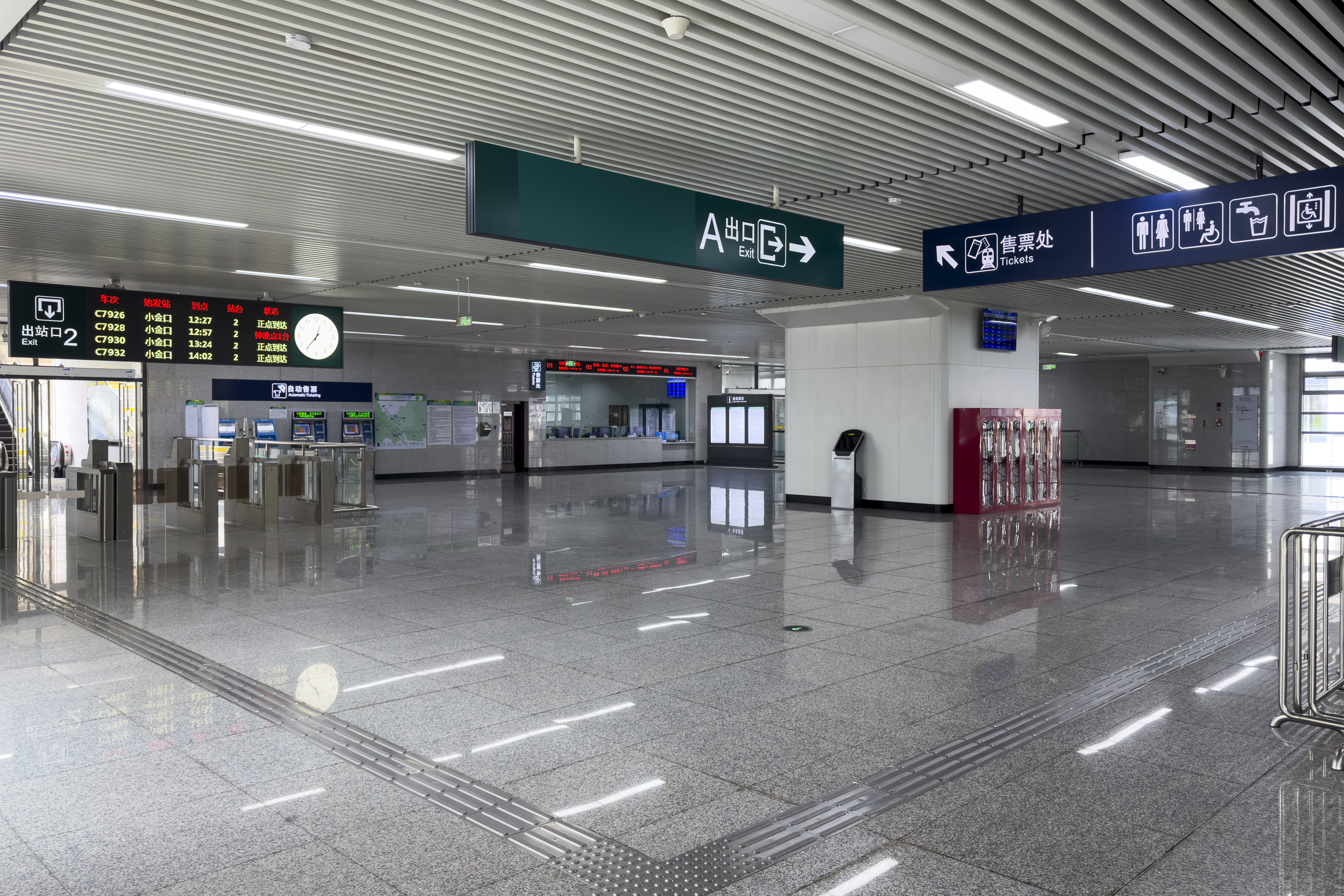
Concourse

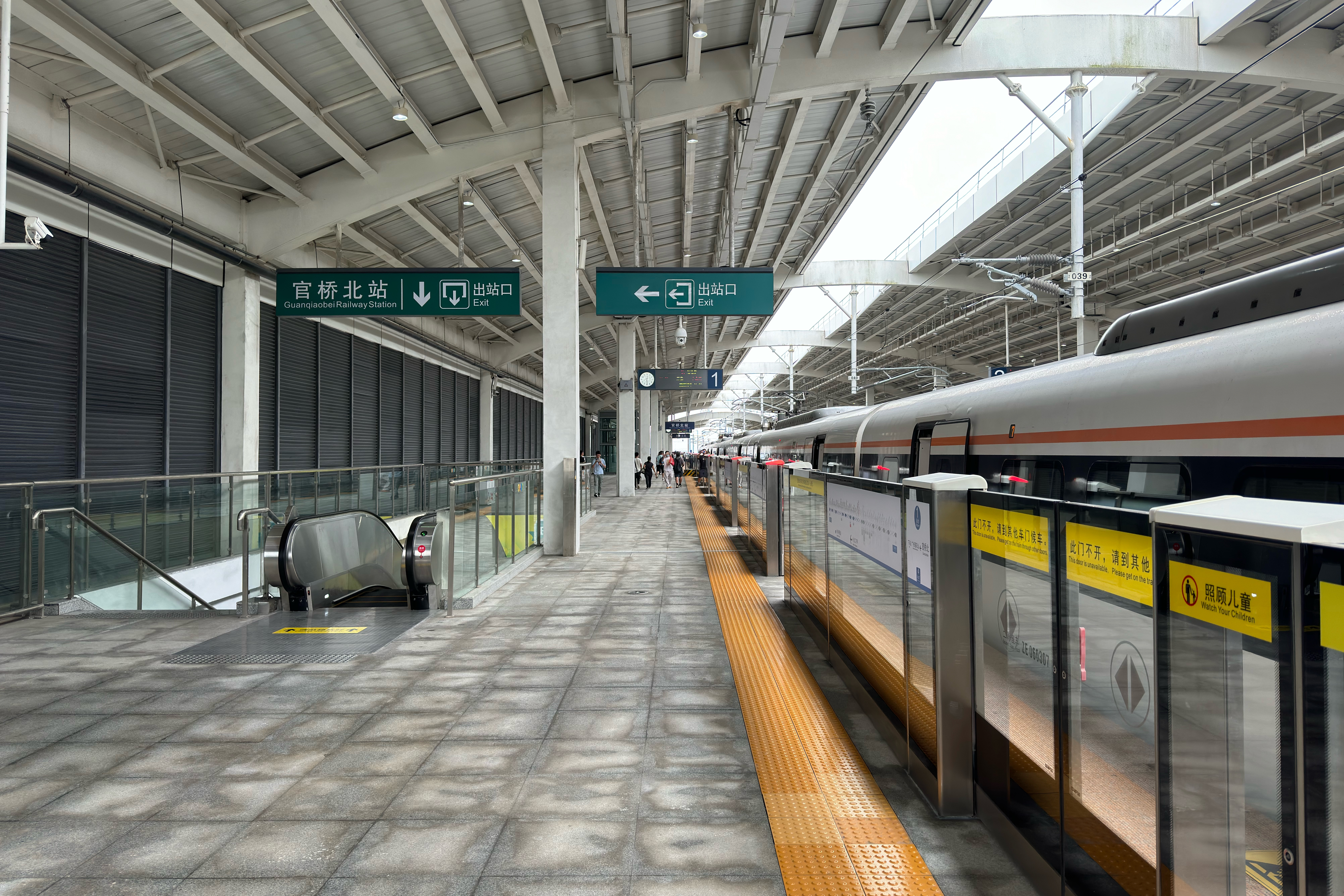
Platform 1
