= Donghuan railway station =

Guangdong Intercity railway station in Guangzhou, China

Donghuan 东环
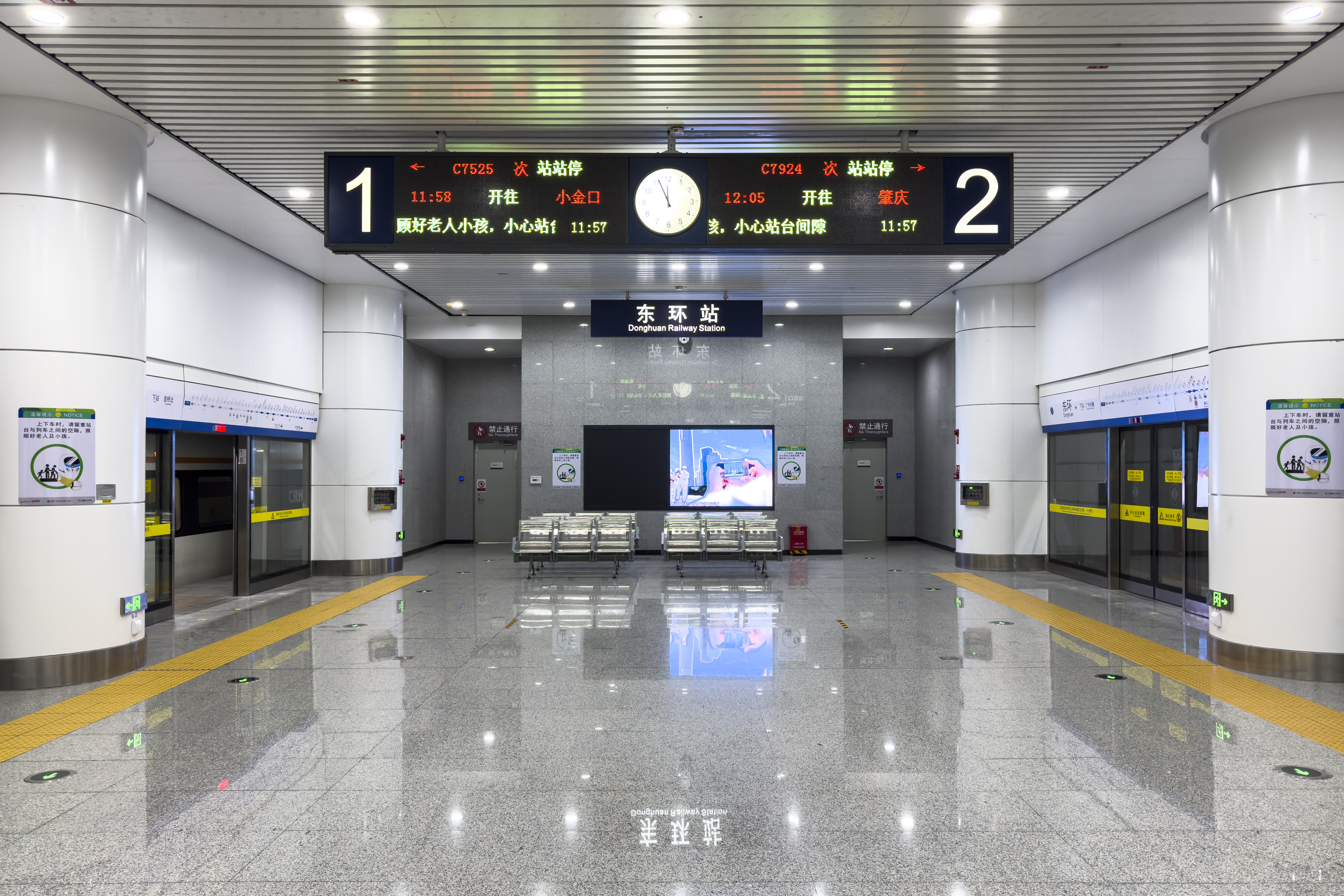
- Platform

Chinese name
- Simplified Chinese: 东环站
- Traditional Chinese: 東環站
Transcriptions
Standard Mandarin
- Hanyu Pinyin: Dōnghuán Zhàn
Yue: Cantonese
- Yale Romanization: Dūngwàan Jaahm
- Jyutping: Dung^{1}waan^{4} Zaam^{6}

General information
- Location: Panyu Boulevard North, Donghuan Subdistrict, Panyu District, Guangzhou, Guangdong; China
- Coordinates: 22°58′36.686″N 113°21′37.835″E
- Owner: Pearl River Delta Metropolitan Region intercity railway
- Operator: Guangdong Intercity
- Line: Guangzhou–Huizhou intercity railway
- Platforms: 2 (1 island platform)
- Tracks: 2

Construction
- Structure type: Underground
- Accessible: Yes

Other information
- Station code: DHA (Pinyin: DHU)

History
- Opened: 26 May 2024 (2 years ago)

Services
Preceding station	Pearl River Delta Metropolitan Region Intercity Railway	Following station
Guangzhou Changlong towards Panyu	Guangzhou–Huizhou intercity railway	Guanqiao North towards Huizhou North
Location

Donghuan railway station (Chinese: 东环站; pinyin: Dōnghuán Zhàn; Cantonese Yale: Dūngwàan Jaahm) is an underground railway station on Guangzhou–Huizhou intercity railway located in Panyu District, Guangzhou, Guangdong, China. The station opened on 26 May 2024, and is operated by Guangdong Intercity Railway Operation Co., Ltd.

== Entrances/exits ==
The station has 4 points of entry/exit, lettered A-D. Currently only Exits A and C are open, both are located on Panyu Boulevard. Exit B is accessible via elevator.

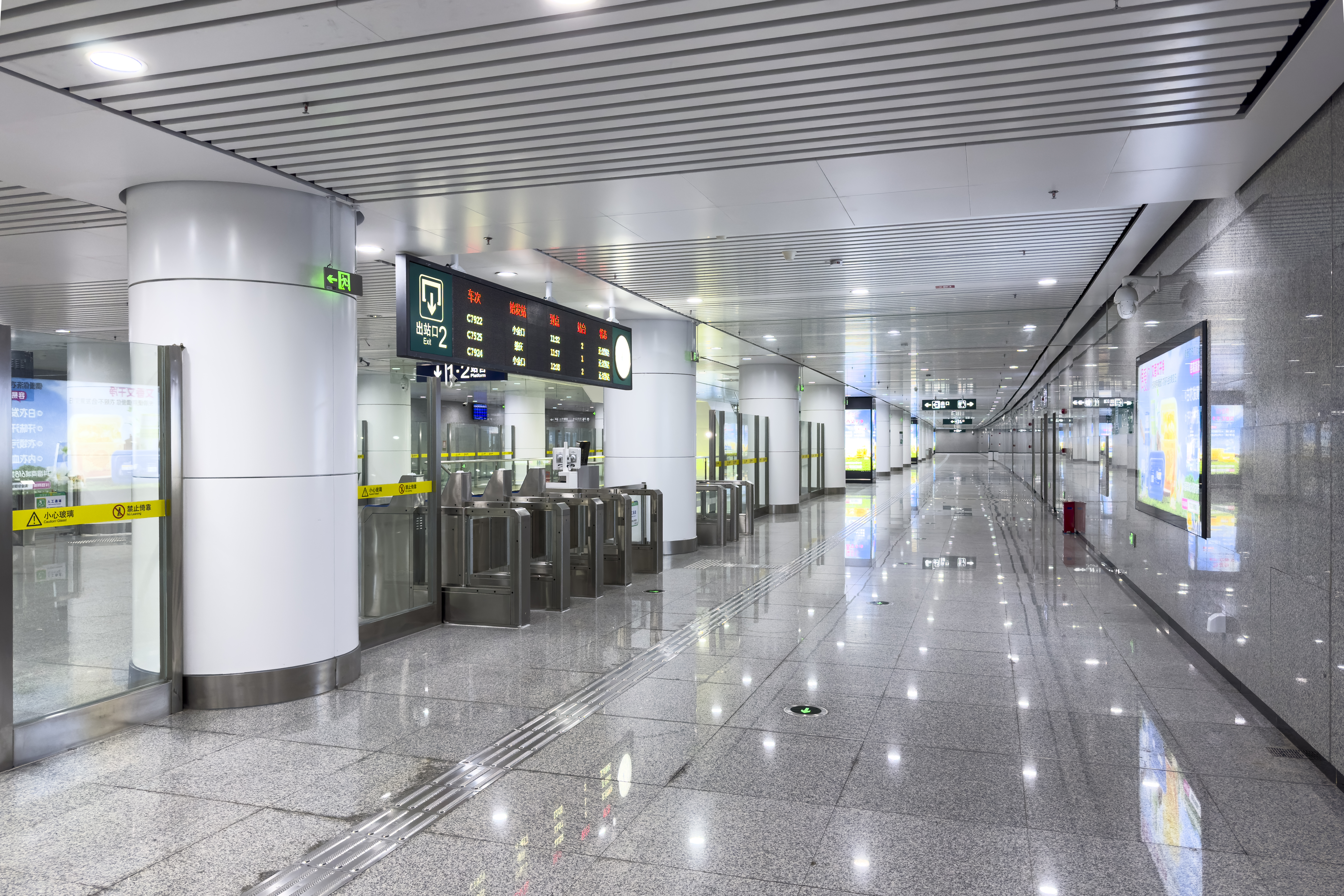
Concourse

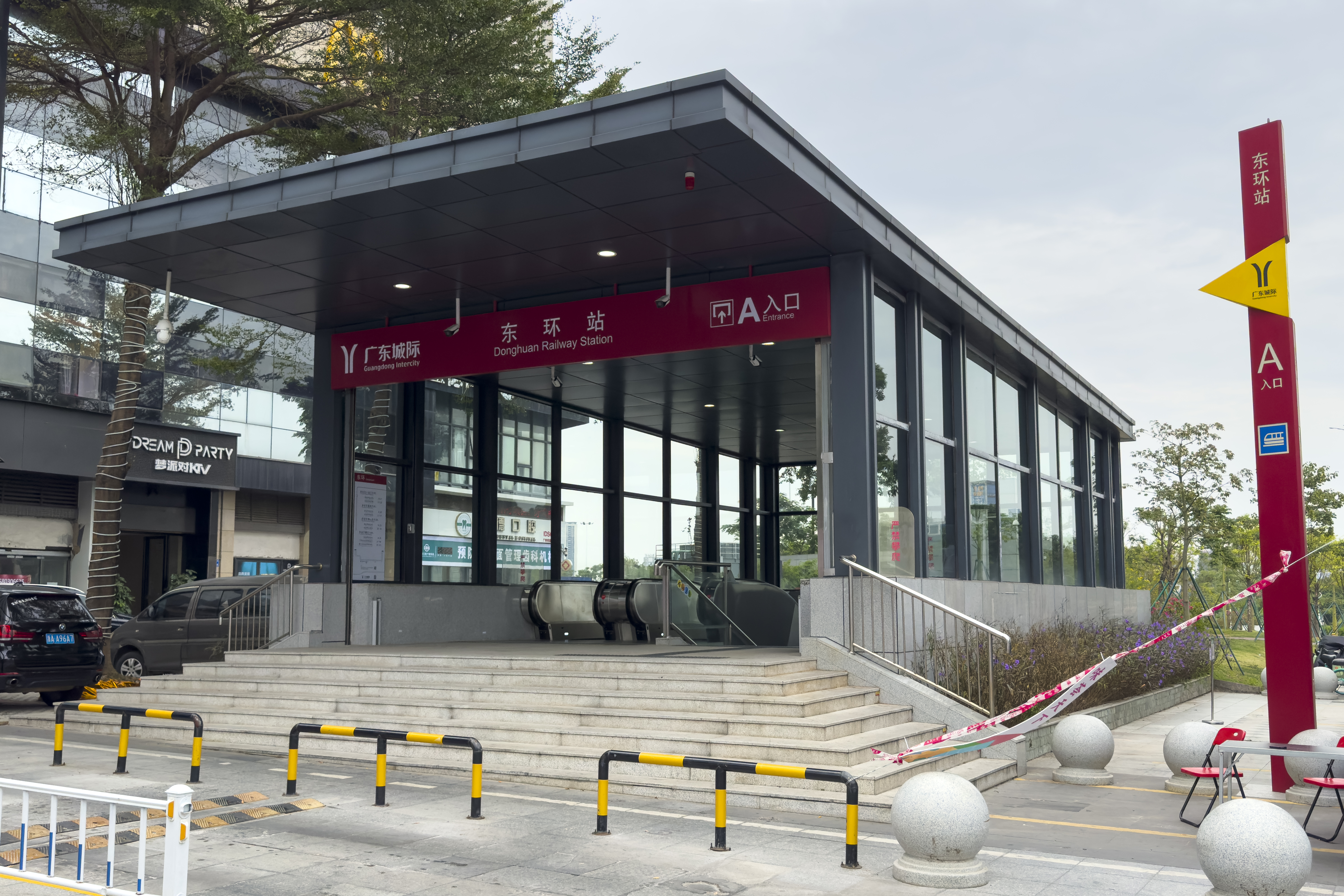
Entrance A

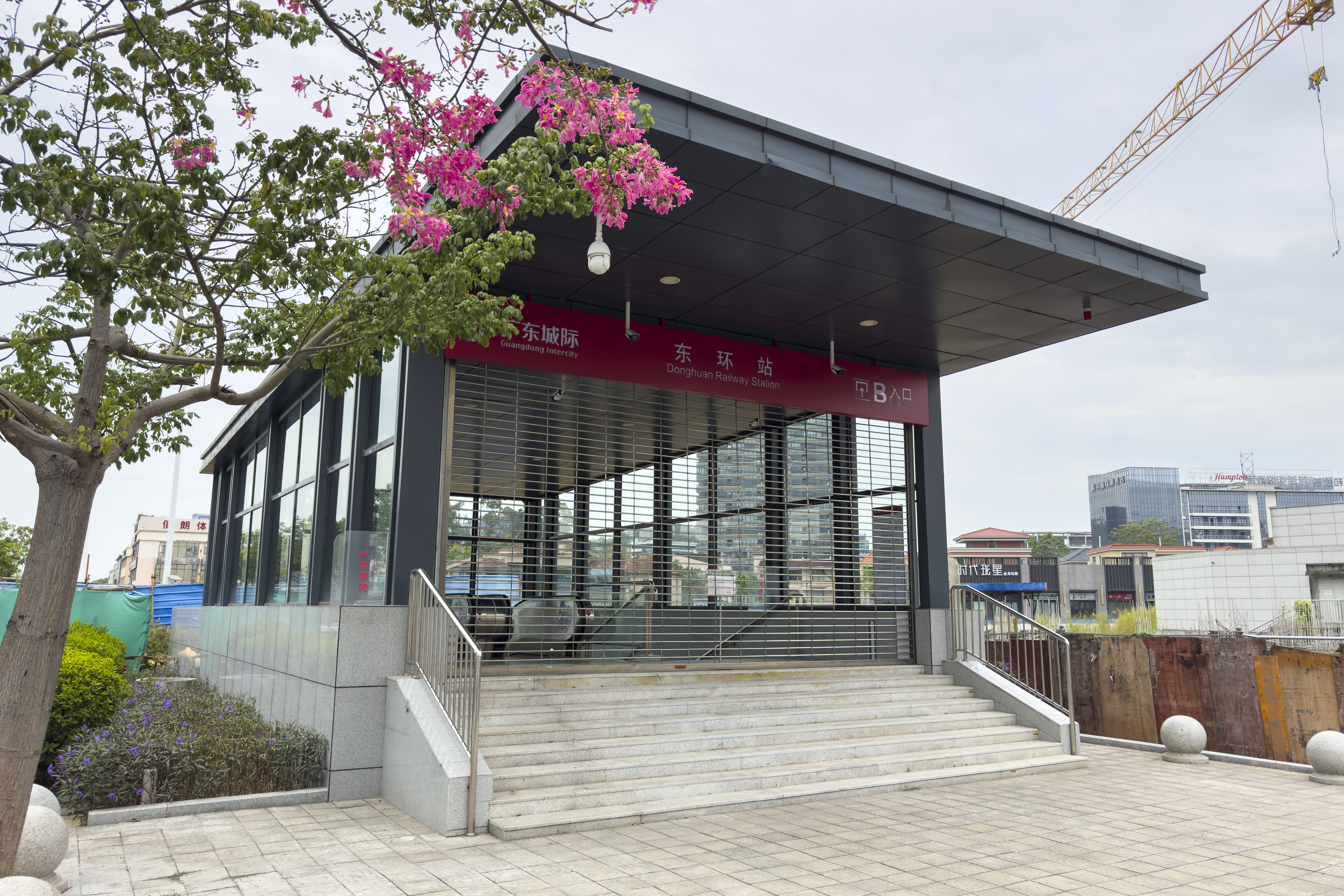
Entrance B (not open)

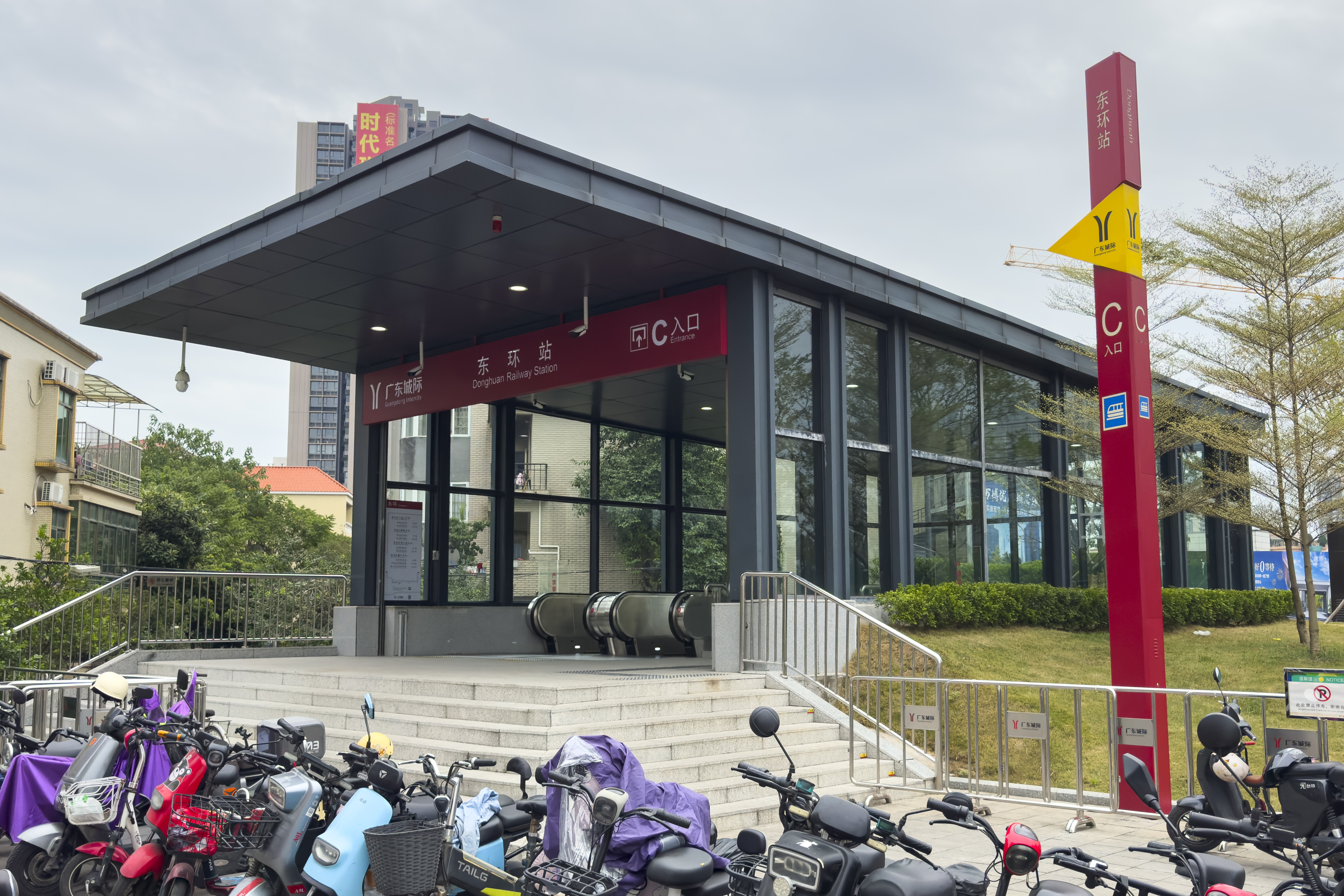
Entrance C

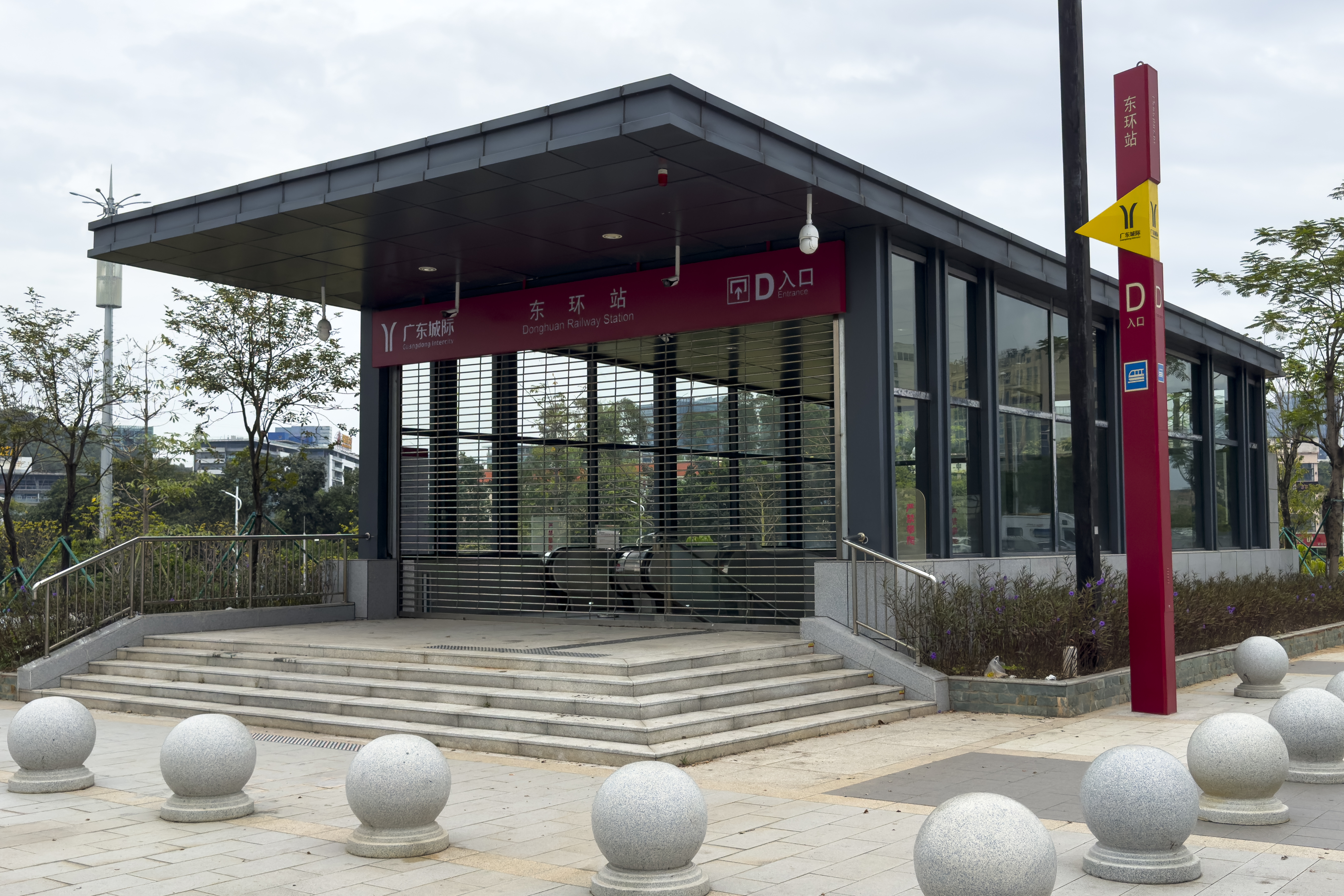
Entrance D (not open)

== History ==
Guanghui intercity initially called this station Science Park station, which was replaced by the name Panyu Dadao station in the EIA stage in 2013. In April 2017, the station officially started construction. On November 26, 2020, the station was renamed Donghuan. By the end of the year, the main structure of the station had been capped and four entrances and exits had been excavated.
