= Guangzhou Lianhuashan railway station =

Guangdong Intercity railway station in Guangzhou, China

Guangzhoulianhuashan 广州莲花山
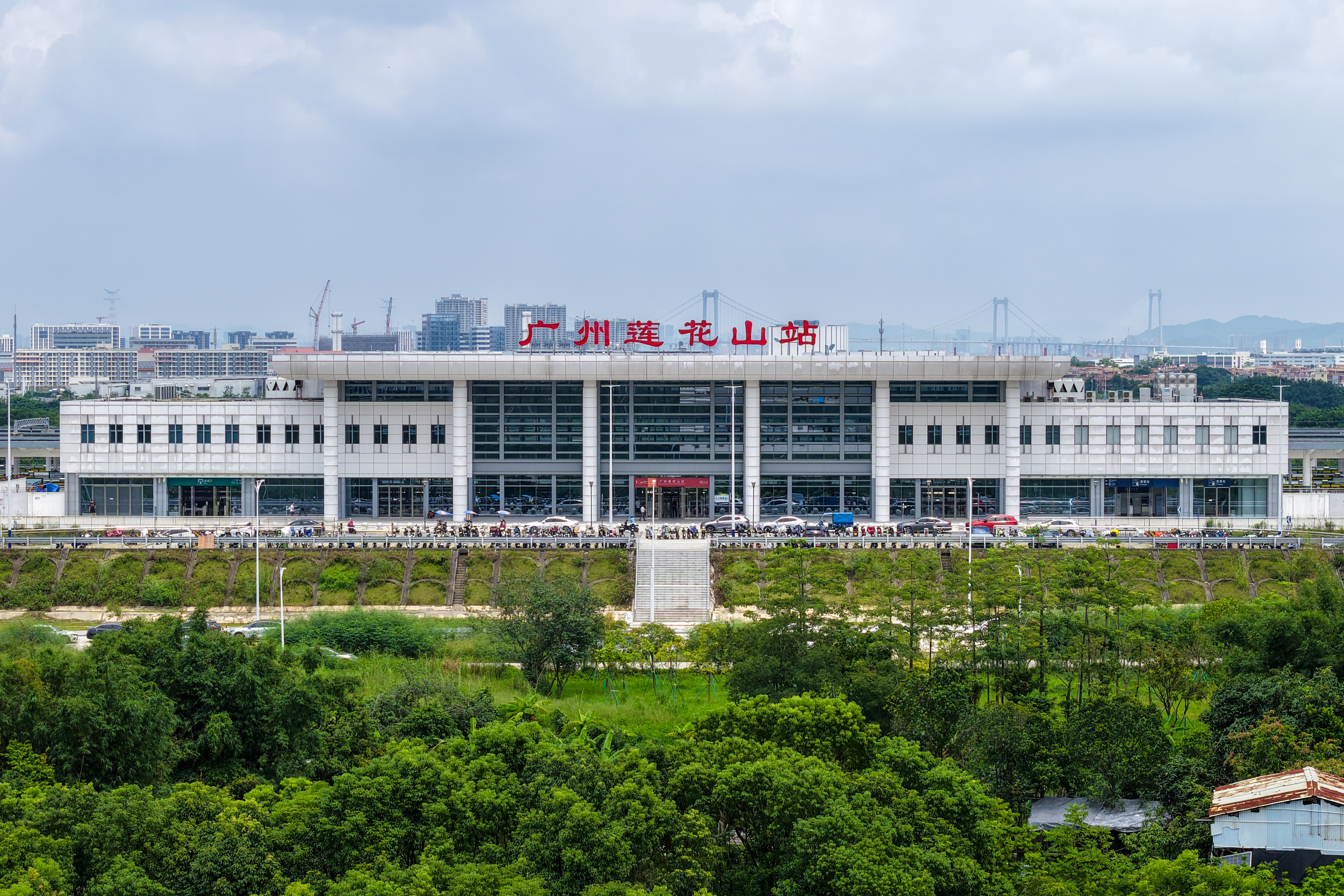
- Exterior

Chinese name
- Simplified Chinese: 广州莲花山站
- Traditional Chinese: 廣州蓮花山站
Transcriptions
Standard Mandarin
- Hanyu Pinyin: Guǎngzhōu Liánhuāshān Zhàn
Yue: Cantonese
- Yale Romanization: Gwóngjāu Lìhnfāsāan Jaahm
- Jyutping: Gwong^{2}zau^{1} Lin^{4}faa^{1}saan^{1} Zaam^{6}

General information
- Location: Lianhua Road (莲花路); Shilou, Panyu District, Guangzhou, Guangdong; China
- Coordinates: 23°0′17.78″N 113°29′12.77″E
- Owner: Pearl River Delta Metropolitan Region intercity railway
- Operator: Guangdong Intercity
- Lines: Guangzhou–Huizhou intercity railway; Pazhou–Lianhuashan intercity railway
- Platforms: 6 (2 island platforms and 2 side platforms)
- Tracks: 6
- Connections: 8 (future)

Construction
- Structure type: At-grade
- Accessible: Yes

Other information
- Station code: GLA (Pinyin: GZS)

History
- Opened: Guangzhou–Huizhou intercity railway: 26 May 2024 (2 years ago); Pazhou–Lianhuashan intercity railway: 29 September 2025 (13 months ago)

Services
Preceding station	Pearl River Delta Metropolitan Region Intercity Railway	Following station
Guanqiao North towards Panyu	Guangzhou–Huizhou intercity railway	Machong towards Huizhou North
Hualong South towards Pazhou	Pazhou–Lianhuashan intercity railway	through to Guangzhou–Huizhou intercity railway
Location

Guangzhou Lianhuashan railway station (Chinese: 广州莲花山站; pinyin: Guǎngzhōu Liánhuāshān Zhàn; Cantonese Yale: Gwóngjāu Lìhnfāsāan Jaahm; lit. 'Guangzhou Lotus Hill station') is a railway station on Guangzhou–Huizhou intercity railway and Pazhou branch of the Guangzhou–Shenzhen intercity railway located in Panyu District, Guangzhou, Guangdong, China. It opened on 26 May 2024.

== Features ==
The station has 2 at-grade island platforms and 2 side platforms, and the station design incorporates lotus elements.

=== Layout ===
G	Side platform
G	Platform 6	Reserved platform
G	Platform 5	GH towards Dongguan West or Huizhou North (Machong)
G	Island platform, doors will open on the left or right
G	Platform 4	GH towards Dongguan West or Huizhou North (Machong)
G	Platform 3	GH towards Panyu, Foshan West or Zhaoqing (Guanqiao North)
G	Island platform, doors will open on the left or right
G	Platform 2	PL towards Pazhou and Huadu (Hualong South)
G	Platform 1	Reserved platform
G	Side platform
G	Concourse, Entrances/Exits	Entrance, Ticket Office, Waiting Area, Exit
B1	Connecting passage	Towards concourse and platforms

== History ==
The station was originally called Lianhua station, but was changed to Guangzhou Lianhuashan station on 26 November 2020. On 30 November the same year, the station topped out.

== Future development ==
The planned eastern extension of Guangzhou Metro Line 8 will have Lianhua station on the southeast side of the station. When it is constructed, a new transfer channel will be built to connect the station platform and the station building.

== Gallery ==
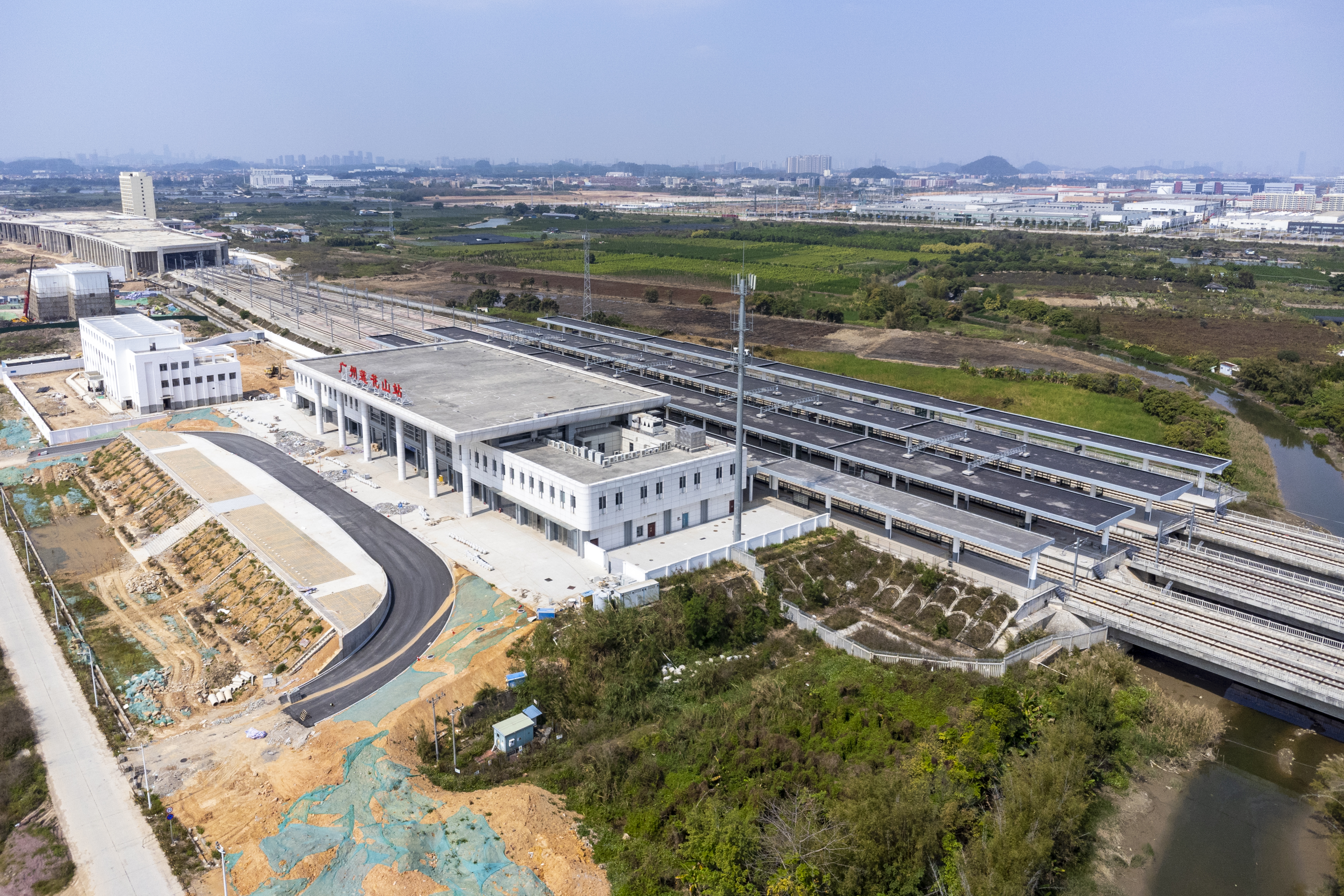
Aerial view of the station

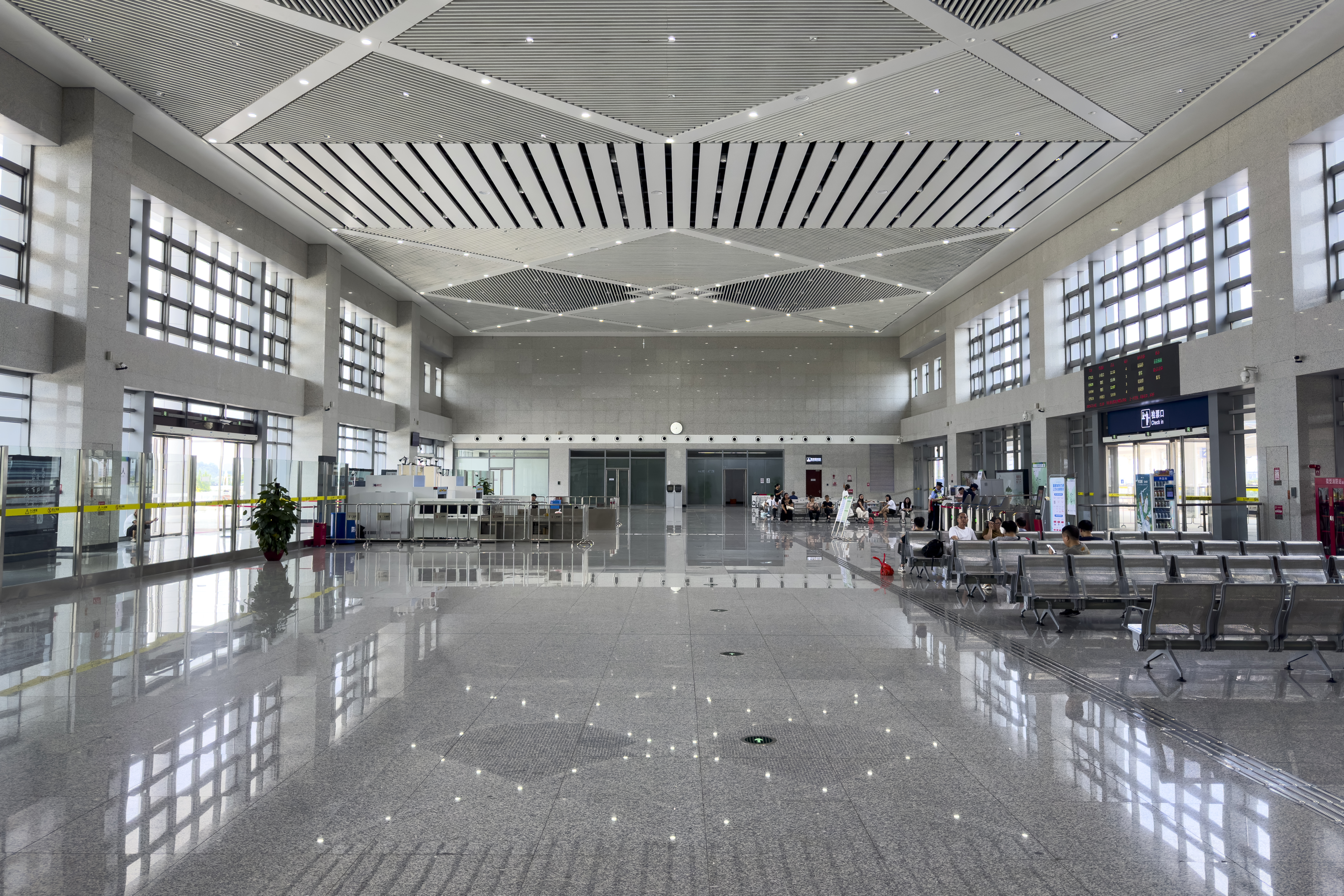
Concourse

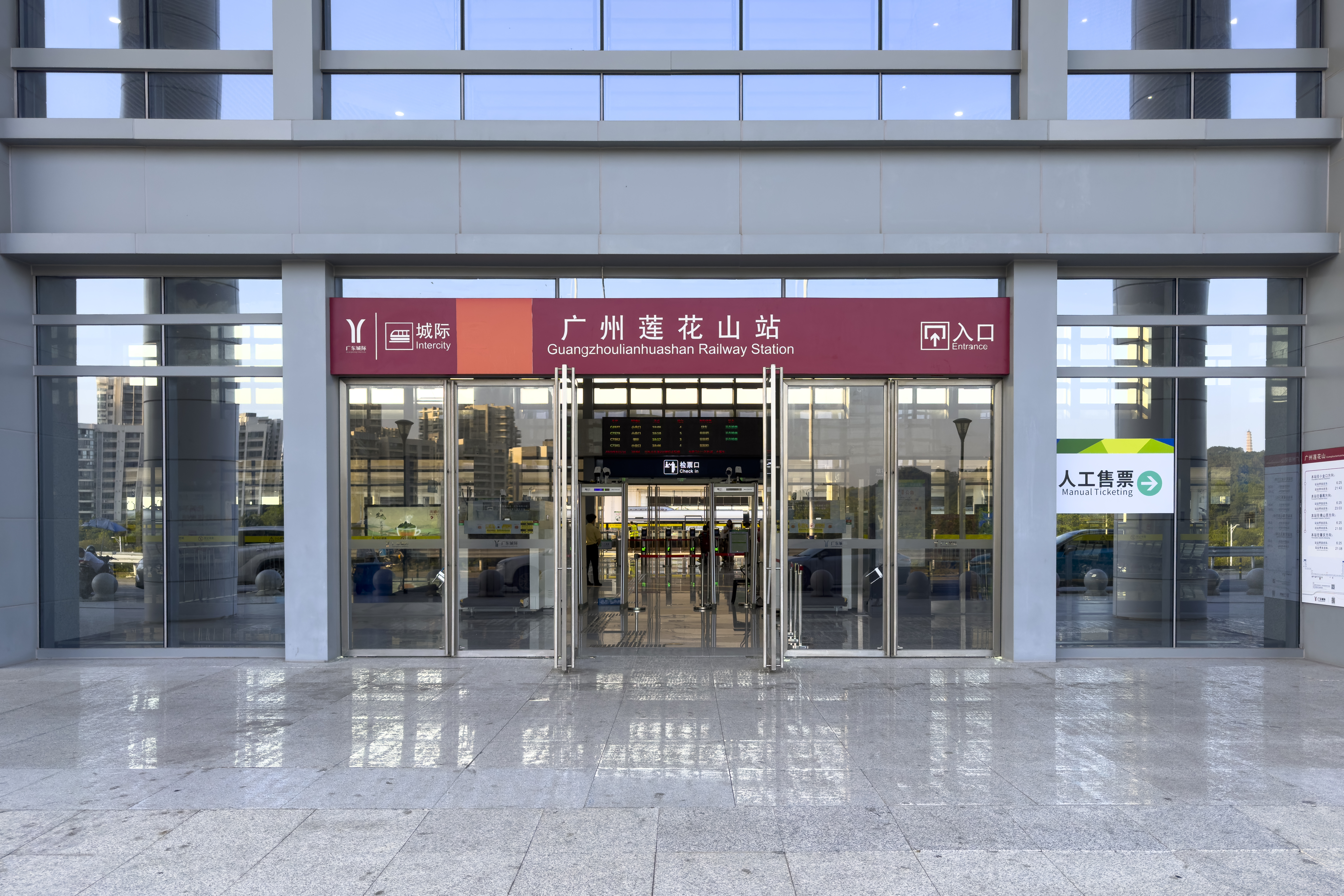
Entrance

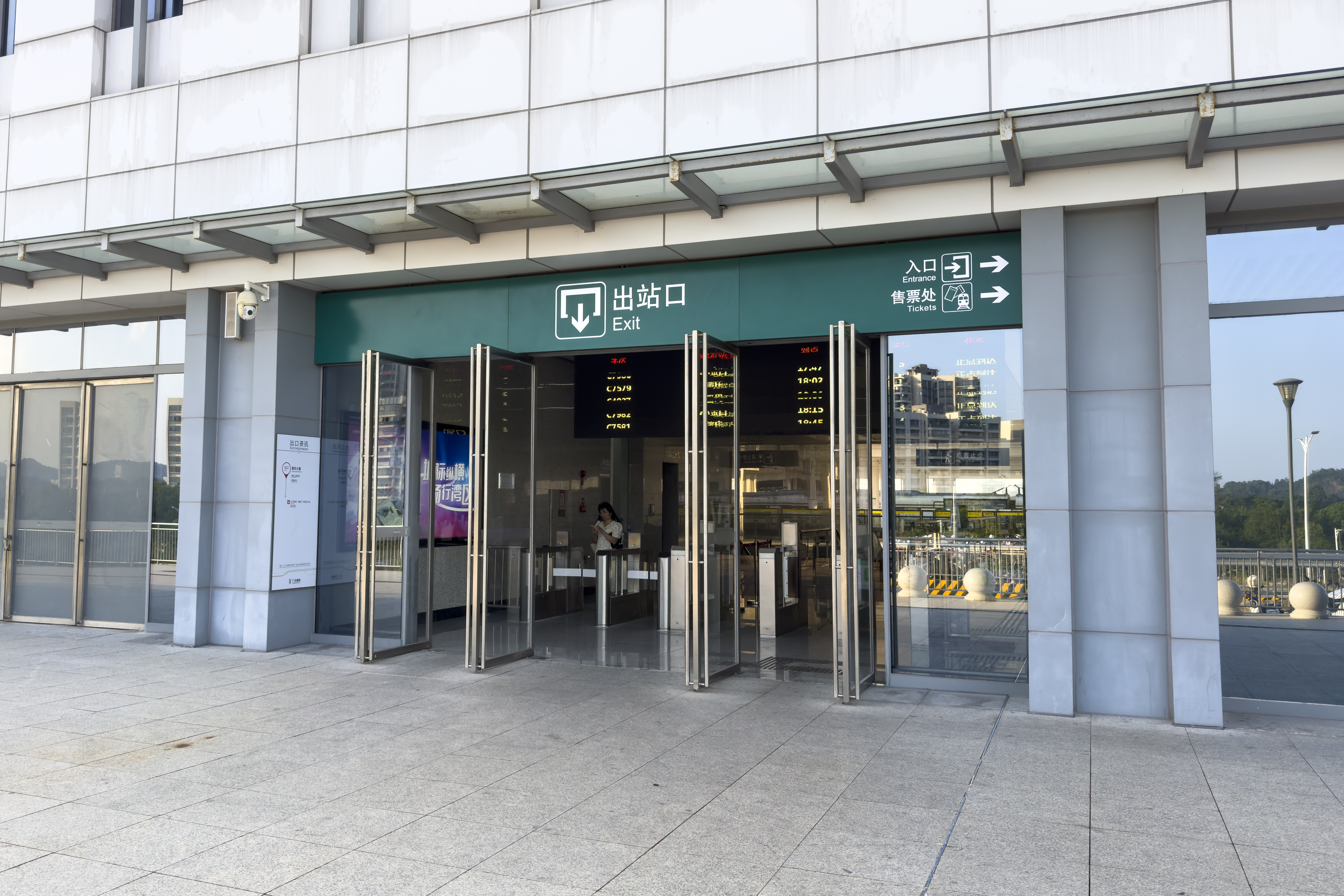
Exit
