= Hongmei railway station =

Railway station in Dongguan, Guangdong

Hongmei 洪梅
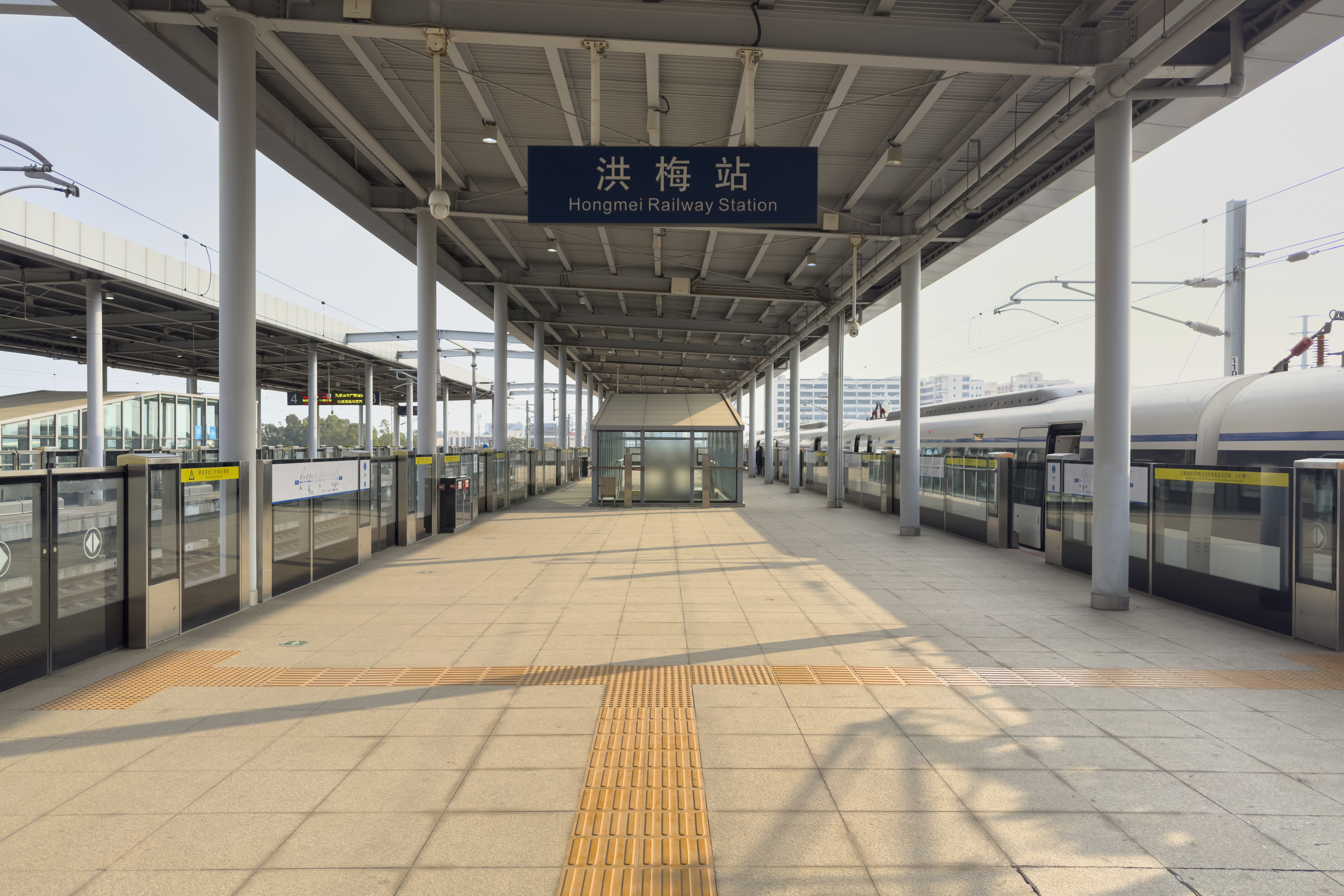
- Platform

Chinese name
- Chinese: 洪梅站
Transcriptions
Standard Mandarin
- Hanyu Pinyin: Hóngméi Zhàn
Yue: Cantonese
- Yale Romanization: Hùhngmùih Jaahm
- Jyutping: Hung^{4}mui^{4} Zaam^{6}

General information
- Location: Hongmei, Dongguan, Guangdong; China
- Coordinates: 22°58′59.17″N 113°36′45.23″E
- Owner: Pearl River Delta Metropolitan Region intercity railway
- Operator: Guangdong Intercity
- Line: Guangzhou–Shenzhen intercity railway
- Platforms: 4 (2 island platforms)
- Tracks: 4

Construction
- Structure type: Elevated
- Accessible: Yes

History
- Opened: 15 December 2019 (6 years ago)

Services
Preceding station	Pearl River Delta Metropolitan Region Intercity Railway	Following station
Dongguan West towards Zhuliao	Guangzhou–Shenzhen intercity railway	Dongguangang towards Shenzhen Airport
Location

Hongmei railway station (Chinese: 洪梅站; pinyin: Hóngméi Zhàn; Cantonese Yale: Hùhngmùih Jaahm) is a railway station in Dongguan, Guangdong, China. It is an intermediate stop on the Guangzhou–Shenzhen intercity railway and was opened on 15 December 2019. It takes approximately 18 minutes to travel to Xintang South railway station and an hour to travel to Shenzhen Airport.

The station has two island platforms.
