= Pazhou station =

Pazhou station may refer to:

- Pazhou station (Guangzhou Metro), station of Guangzhou Metro
- Pazhou railway station, station of Pearl River Delta Intercity Railway
