= Hualong South railway station =

Guangdong Intercity railway station in Guangzhou, China

Hualongnan 化龙南
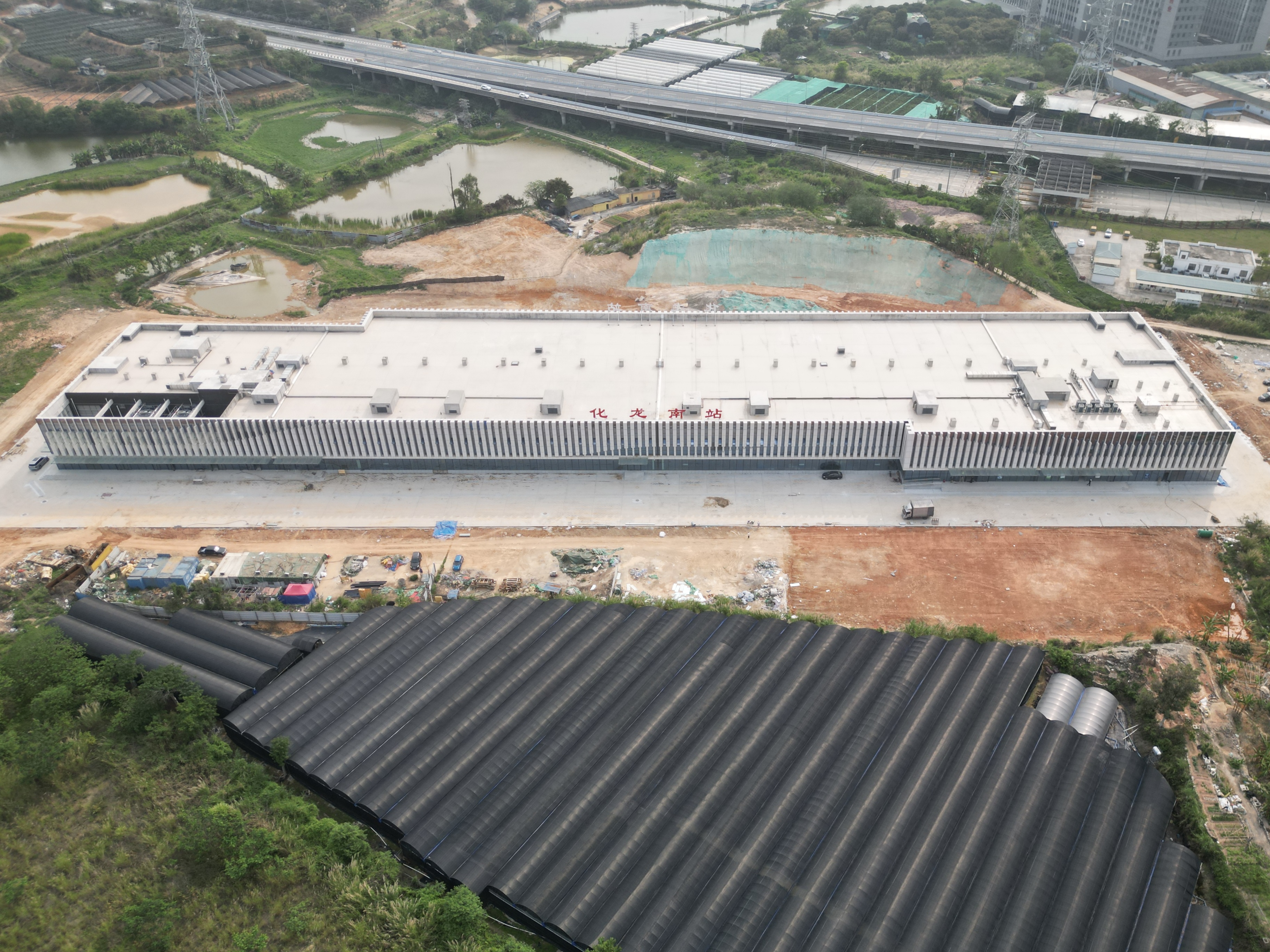
- Exterior

Chinese name
- Simplified Chinese: 化龙南站
- Traditional Chinese: 化龍南站
Transcriptions
Standard Mandarin
- Hanyu Pinyin: Huàlóng Nán Zhàn
Yue: Cantonese
- Yale Romanization: Falùhng Nàahm Jaahm
- Jyutping: Faa^{3}lung^{4} Naam^{4} Zaam^{6}

General information
- Location: Between Xingye Avenue (兴业大道) and Hualong Avenue (化龙大道); Hualong, Panyu District, Guangzhou, Guangdong; China
- Coordinates: 23°2′19.90″N 113°26′17.05″E
- Owner: Pearl River Delta Metropolitan Region intercity railway
- Operator: Guangdong Intercity
- Line: Pazhou–Lianhuashan intercity railway
- Platforms: 2 (1 island platform)
- Tracks: 2

Construction
- Structure type: Underground
- Accessible: Yes

Other information
- Station code: HDQ (Pinyin: HLN)

History
- Opened: 29 September 2025 (10 months ago)

Services
Preceding station	Pearl River Delta Metropolitan Region Intercity Railway	Following station
Shenjing towards Pazhou	Pazhou–Lianhuashan intercity railway	Guangzhou Lianhuashan Terminus
Location

Hualong South railway station (Chinese: 化龙南站; pinyin: Huàlóng Nán Zhàn; Cantonese Yale: Falùhng Nàahm Jaahm) is an underground railway station on Pazhou–Lianhuashan intercity railway located in Panyu District, Guangzhou, Guangdong, China. It opened on 29 September 2025.

== Features ==
The station has an underground island platform.

=== Entrances/exits ===
The station has 4 points of entry/exit. In its initial opening, the station opened Exits A and D. The exits have accessible ramps.

- A: Xingye Avenue
- D: Xingye Avenue

== History ==
In the 2016 Pazhou Intercity Branch Line EIA announcement, Hualong station was set up in Hualong, and it was a ground level station. In May 2017, under the consultation of the provincial and municipal governments, all elevated and ground sections of the Pazhou Intercity Branch Line except Guangzhou Lianhuashan were adjusted to underground, and thus the station was also adjusted to an underground station.

The station started construction in 2019, and the main structure topped out on 17 January 2021.

Due to the original station name, "Hualong", conflicting with a station name on the Shouping Railway in Weifang, Shandong, the station name was confirmed as Hualong South (Hualongnan) station in 2025.

On 29 September 2025, the station opened.
