= Pazhou–Lianhuashan intercity railway =

Railway line in Guangdong, China

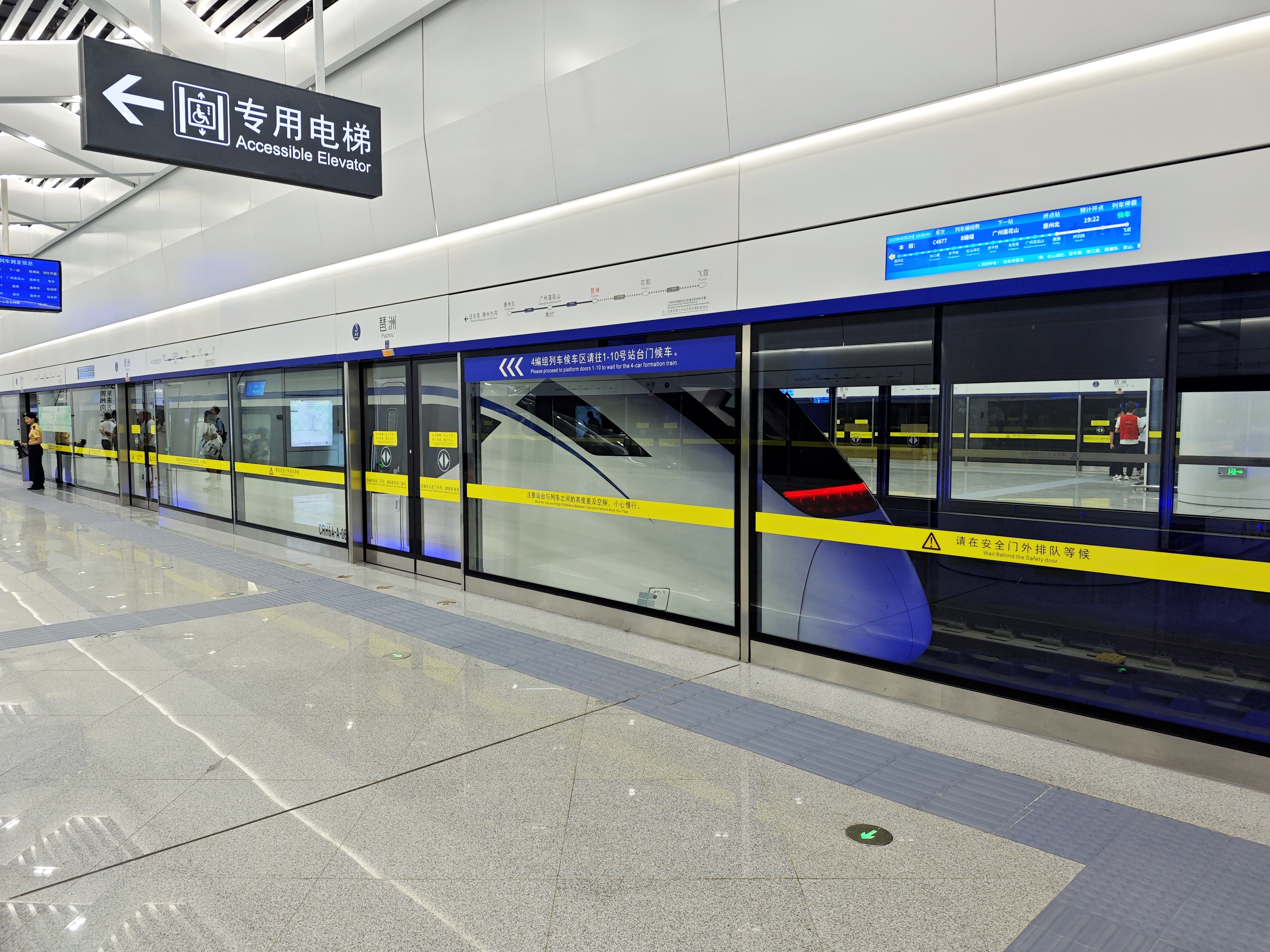
- A CRH6A-A train at Pazhou railway station

Overview
- Other name(s): Pazhou Branch Line of the Guangzhou-Shenzhen intercity railway Pazhou Branch Line
- Native name: 琶莲城际
- Status: In operation
- Locale: Guangzhou, Guangdong, China
- Termini: Pazhou; Guangzhou Lianhuashan
- Stations: 4

Service
- Type: Regional Rail
- System: Pearl River Delta Metropolitan Region intercity railway
- Operator: Guangdong Intercity Railway Operation Co., Ltd.

History
- Opened: 29 September 2025; 11 months ago

Technical
- Line length: 18.2 km (11.3 mi)
- Number of tracks: 2
- Track gauge: 1,435 mm (4 ft 8 1/2 in)
- Electrification: 25 kV AC Overhead catenary
- Operating speed: 160 km/h (99 mph) (Maximum design speed)
- Signalling: CRTS-I two-block

Pazhou-Lianhuashan Intercity Railway, also known as Pazhou Branch Line, is a regional rail within Guangzhou, Guangdong province, China. It is a part of the Pearl River Delta Metropolitan Region intercity railway system. The maximum design speed is 160 km/h which the one-way running time of trains is about 18 minutes, and the maximum fare is 11 RMB.

Construction was started on 26 December 2018. On 29 September 2025 at 12:00 am, the Pazhou-Lianhuashan Intercity Railway was officially put into operation; along with Guangzhou East Ring intercity railway, and the northern extension of the Guangzhou-Huizhou intercity railway from Xiaojinkou to Huizhou North.

== Stations ==
Service Pattern		Station			Connections & Transfers		Location
Local	Special Exp./Exp.	Code	Name		Pearl River Delta ICR	Metro	Location
Local	Special Exp./Exp.	Code	English	Chinese	Pearl River Delta ICR	Metro	Location
↑ through train towards Keyunlu, Zhuliao, Baiyun Airport, Huadu, and (Qingyuan) Feixia via Guangzhou East Ring intercity railway ER
●	●	PTQ	Pazhou	琶洲	ER (through service)	8 11 (Pazhou); THZ1 (Canton Fair Complex West, now temporarily closed)	Haizhu
●	｜	SHQ	Shenjing	深井	—	7 (Shenjing)	Huangpu
●	｜	HDQ	Hualong South (Hualongnan)	化龙南	—	—	Panyu
●	●	GLA	Guangzhou Lianhuashan	广州莲花山	GH (through service)	—	Panyu
↓ through train towards Machong, Dongguan West, Huizhou North and Shenzhen via Guangzhou–Huizhou intercity railway GH
