= Machong railway station =

Intercity railway station in Dongguan, Guangdong, China

Machong 麻涌
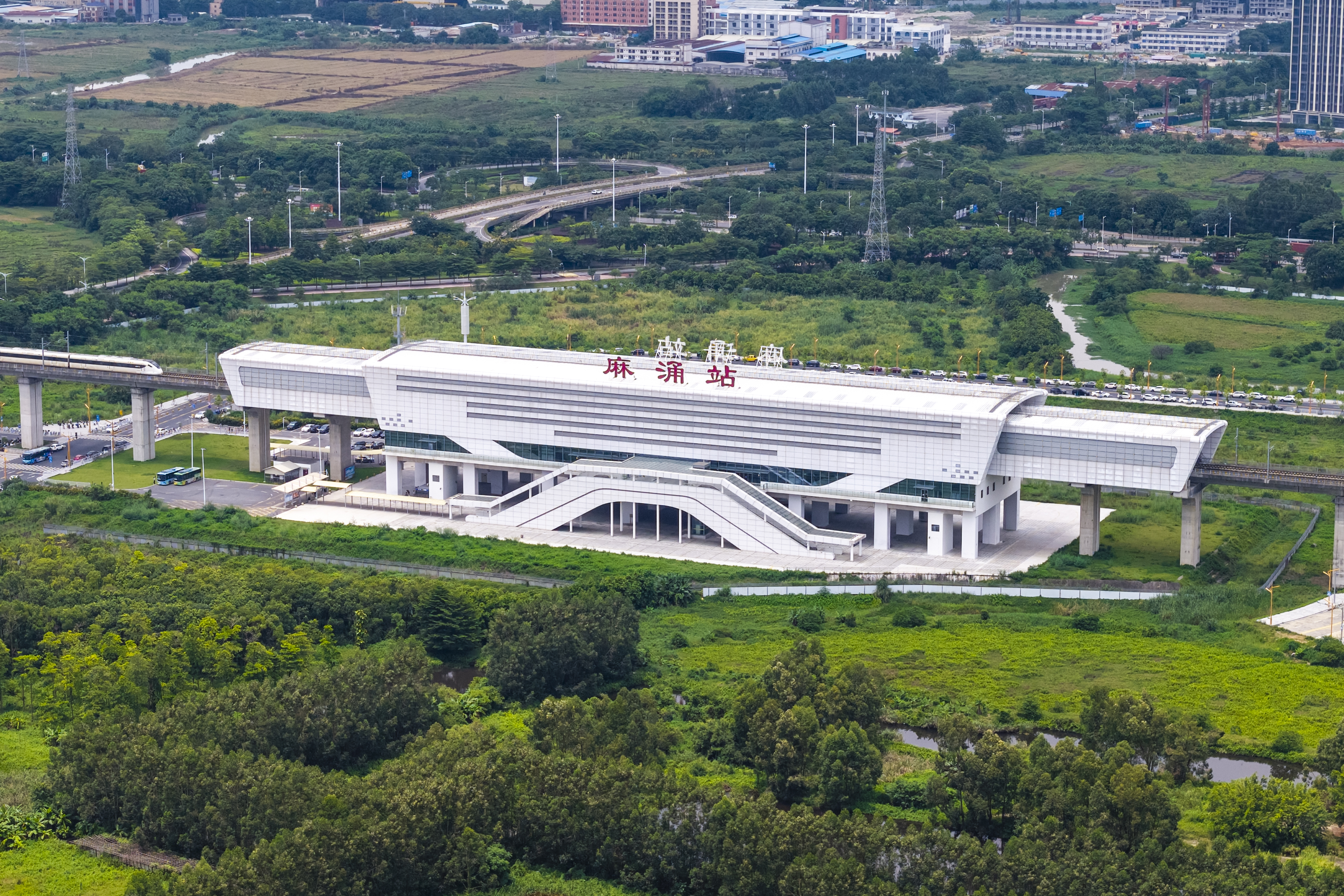
- Exterior

Chinese name
- Chinese: 麻涌站
Transcriptions
Standard Mandarin
- Hanyu Pinyin: Máchōng Zhàn
Yue: Cantonese
- Yale Romanization: Màhchūng Jaahm
- Jyutping: Maa^{4}cung^{1} Zaam^{6}

General information
- Location: Machong Boulevard, Machong, Dongguan, Guangdong; China
- Coordinates: 23°1′23.74″N 113°34′8.15″E
- Owner: Pearl River Delta Metropolitan Region intercity railway
- Operator: Guangdong Intercity
- Line: Guangzhou–Huizhou intercity railway
- Platforms: 2 (2 side platforms)
- Tracks: 2

Construction
- Structure type: Elevated
- Accessible: Yes

Other information
- Station code: MIA (Pinyin: MCH)

History
- Opened: 26 May 2024 (2 years ago)

Services
Preceding station	Pearl River Delta Metropolitan Region Intercity Railway	Following station
Guangzhou Lianhuashan towards Panyu	Guangzhou–Huizhou intercity railway	Dongguan West towards Huizhou North
Location

Machong railway station (Chinese: 麻涌站; pinyin: Máchōng Zhàn; Cantonese Yale: Màhchūng Jaahm) is a railway station on Guangzhou–Huizhou intercity railway located in Machong, Dongguan, Guangdong, China. The station opened on 26 May 2024, and is operated by Guangdong Intercity.

== History ==
Construction of Machong Station started on 4 March 2018, and the main structure was topped out on 11 July 2019.

== Entrances/exits ==
The station has 4 points of entry/exit, located on the north and south sides of the station. Currently only the western entrances/exits are used. Both exits are accessible via elevators.

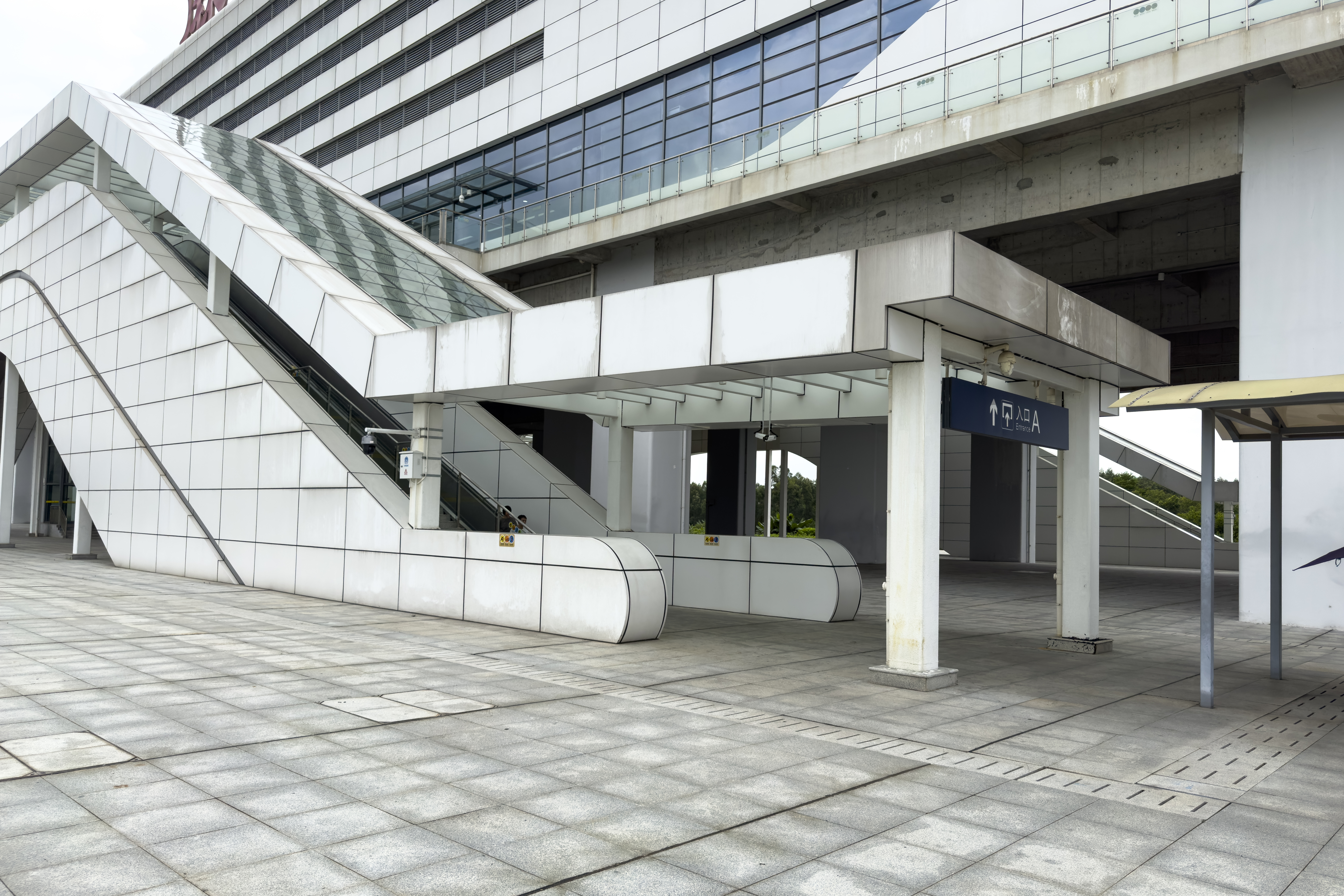
Entrance A1

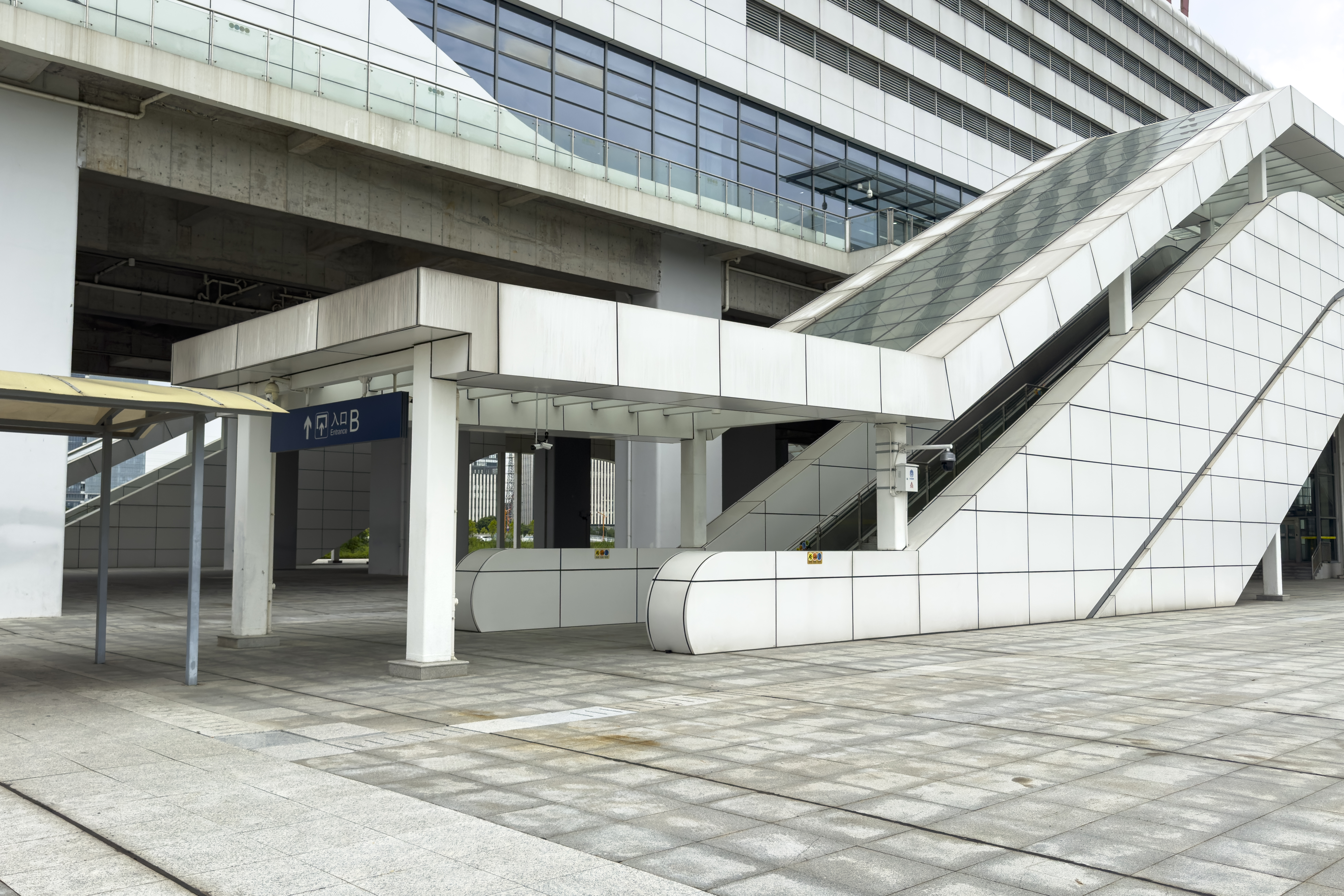
Entrance B1

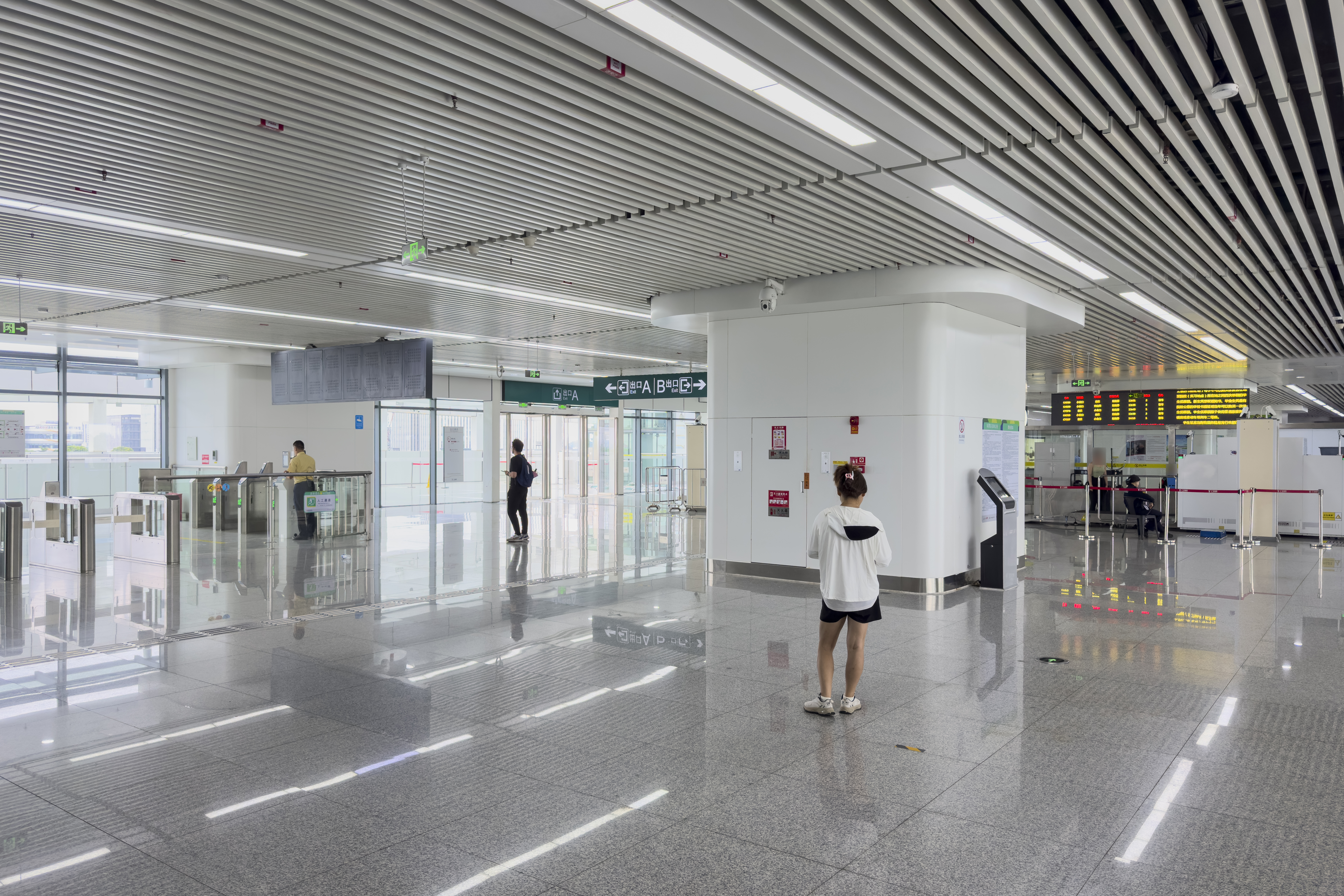
Concourse

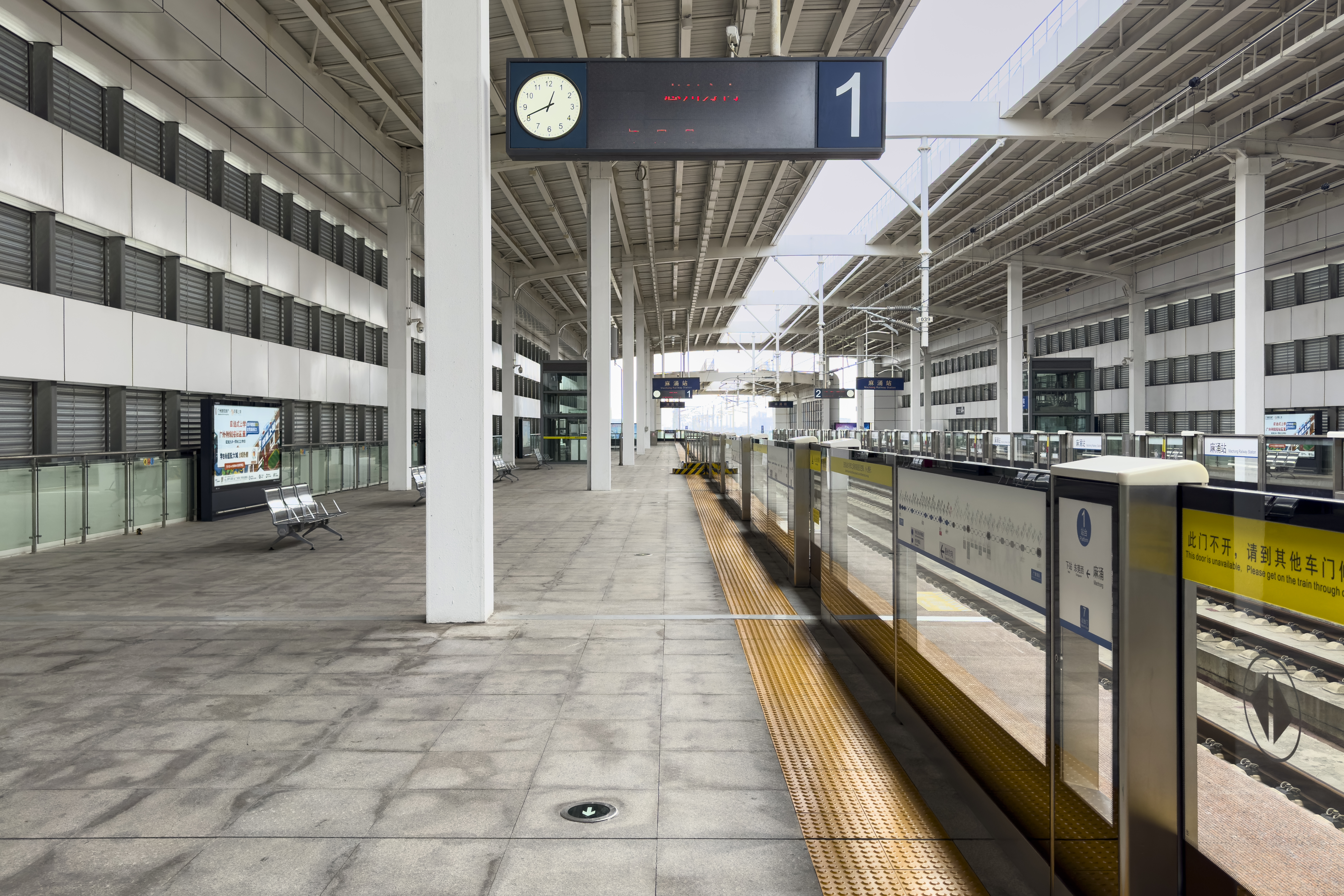
Platform 1
