= Dongguan West railway station =

Railway station in Dongguan, Guangdong, China

Dongguanxi 东莞西
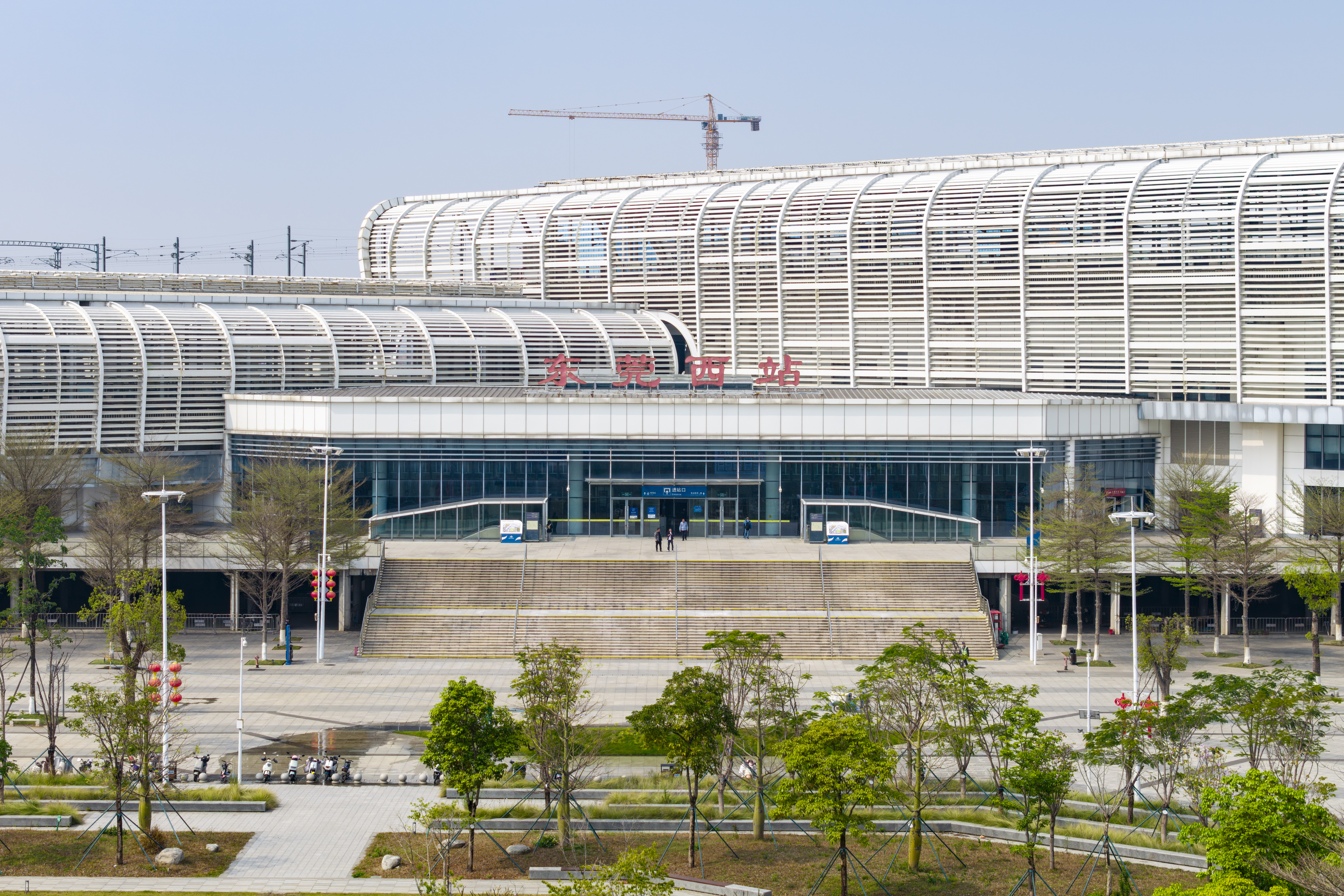
- Main station entrance

Chinese name
- Simplified Chinese: 东莞西站
- Traditional Chinese: 東莞西站
Transcriptions
Standard Mandarin
- Hanyu Pinyin: Dōngguān Xī Zhàn
Yue: Cantonese
- Yale Romanization: Dūnggún Sāi Jaahm
- Jyutping: Dung^{1}gun^{1} Sai^{1} Zaam^{6}

General information
- Location: Intersection of Wanghong Road (望洪路) and Shuixiang Boulevard (水乡大道), Hongmei and Wangniudun, Dongguan, Guangdong; China
- Coordinates: 23°0′40.266″N 113°37′15.128″E
- Owner: Pearl River Delta Metropolitan Region intercity railway
- Operator: Guangdong Intercity Railway Operation Co., Ltd.
- Lines: Guangzhou–Shenzhen intercity railway; Guangzhou–Huizhou intercity railway
- Platforms: 8 (4 island platforms)
- Tracks: 8
- Connections: 1

Construction
- Structure type: Elevated
- Accessible: Yes

Other information
- Station code: WGQ (Pinyin: DGX); Metro: 101

History
- Opened: 15 December 2019 (6 years ago)

Services
Preceding station	Pearl River Delta Metropolitan Region Intercity Railway	Following station
Wangniudun towards Zhuliao	Guangzhou–Shenzhen intercity railway	Hongmei towards Shenzhen Airport
Machong towards Panyu	Guangzhou–Huizhou intercity railway	Daojiao towards Huizhou North
Preceding station	Dongguan Rail Transit	Following station
Terminus	Line 1	Houde towards Meitang
Location

Dongguan West railway station (simplified Chinese: 东莞西站; traditional Chinese: 東莞西站; pinyin: Dōngguān Xī Zhàn; Cantonese Yale: Dūnggún Sāi Jaahm) is a railway station in Hongmei, Dongguan, Guangdong, China.

The station has two levels. The lower level has east–west platforms which serve the Guangzhou–Huizhou intercity railway, of which it was the western terminus until the Guangzhou section opened on 26 May 2024. The upper level has north–south platforms which serve the Guangzhou–Shenzhen intercity railway.

The station is served by Line 1 of the Dongguan Rail Transit.

== Transfer ==
There is a convenient transfer channel on the concourse on the second floor of this station, which allows passengers on the Guanghui/Suishen lines to transfer through the convenient transfer gate without leaving the station and re-checking.

On 23 January 2024, Guangdong Intercity Railway Operation Co., Ltd. took over the operation of Guanghui Intercity, and the Guanghui section of this station was officially handed over to the company. On 23 April, the security checks of Suishen section and Guanghui section of this station were mutually recognized, and passengers did not need to re-check when transferring between the two stations.

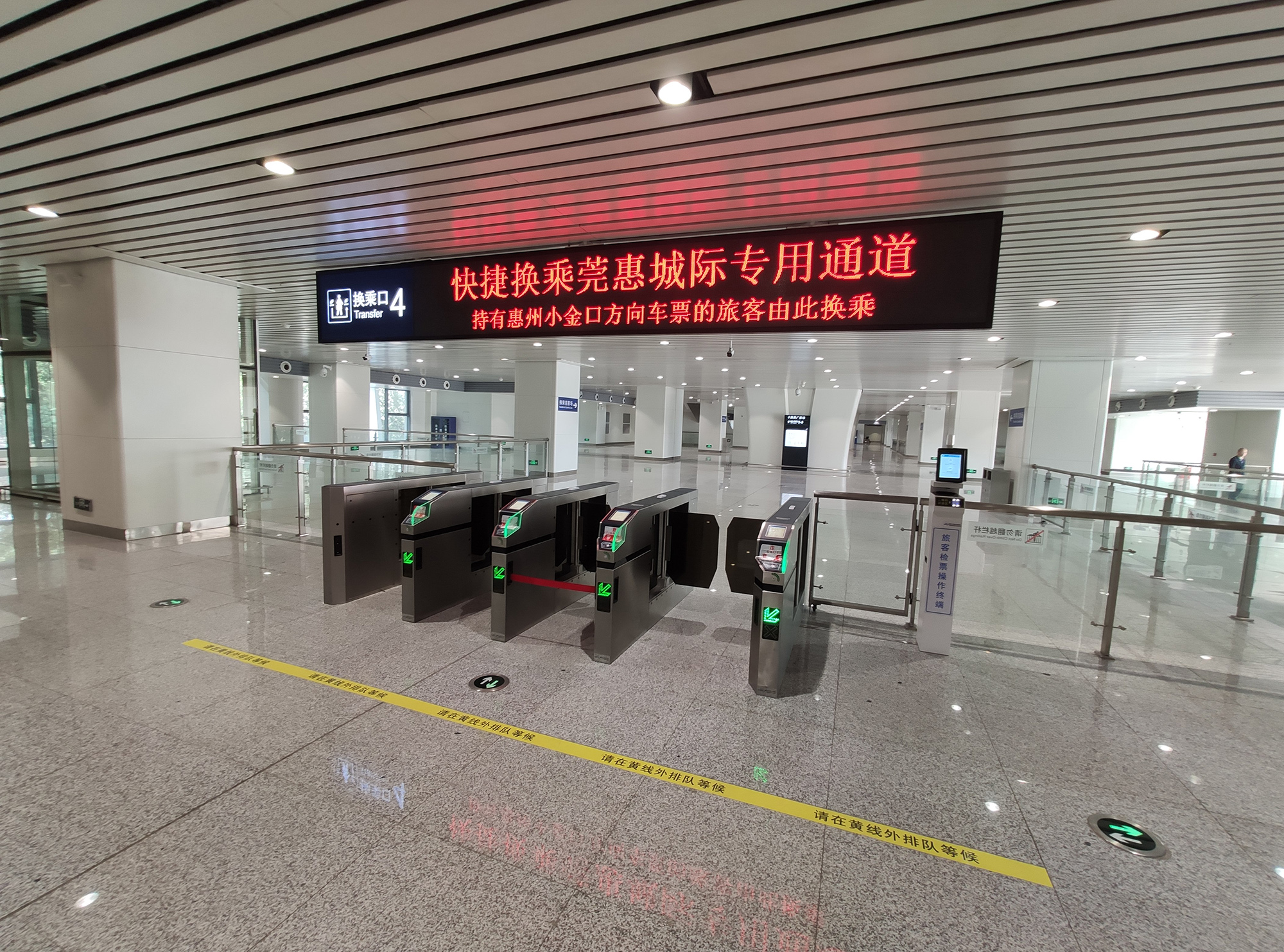
Convenient transfer Gate 4 on the Guanghui intercity side

== Gallery ==
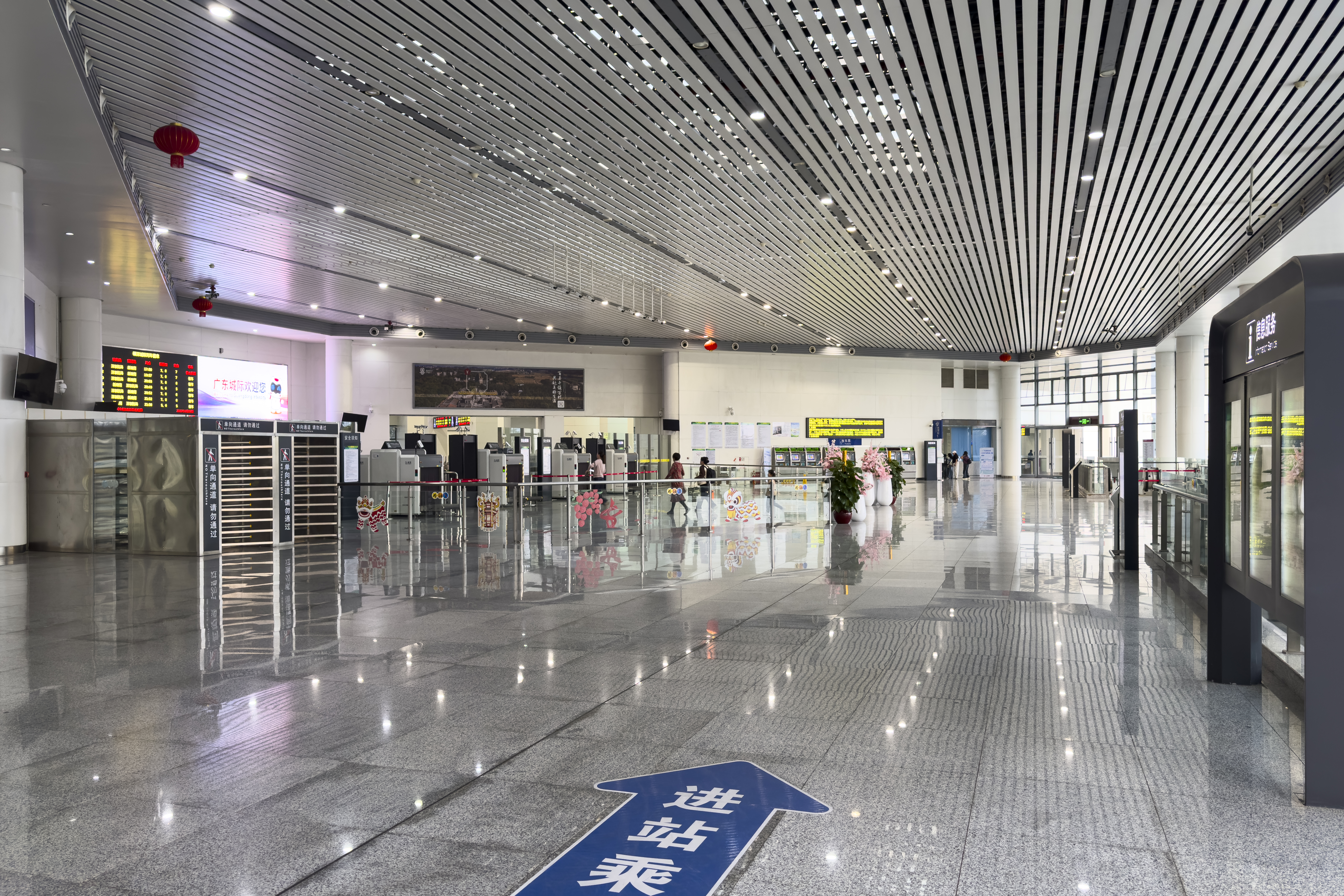
Concourse

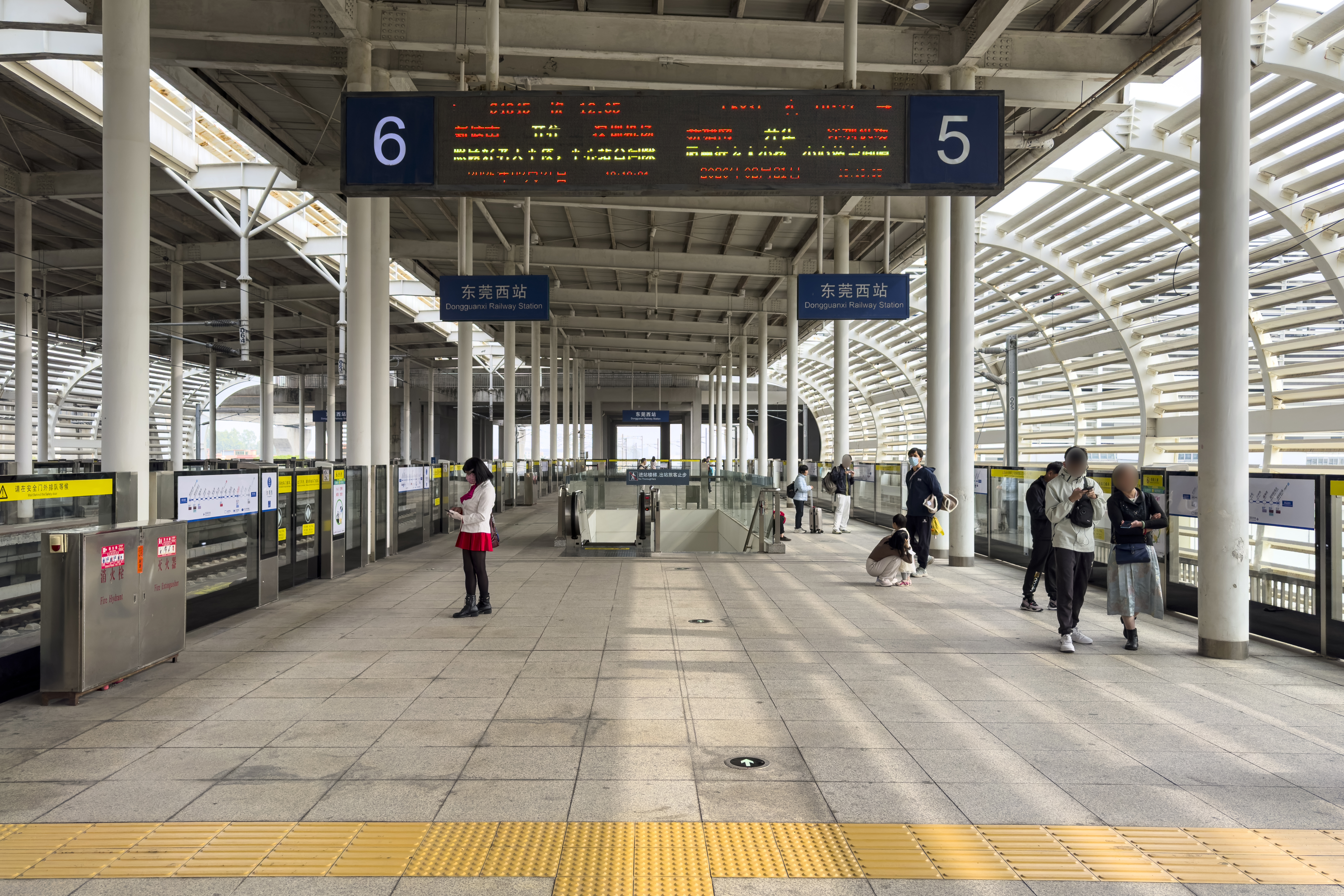
Suishen (Guangzhou-Shenzhen) intercity platform

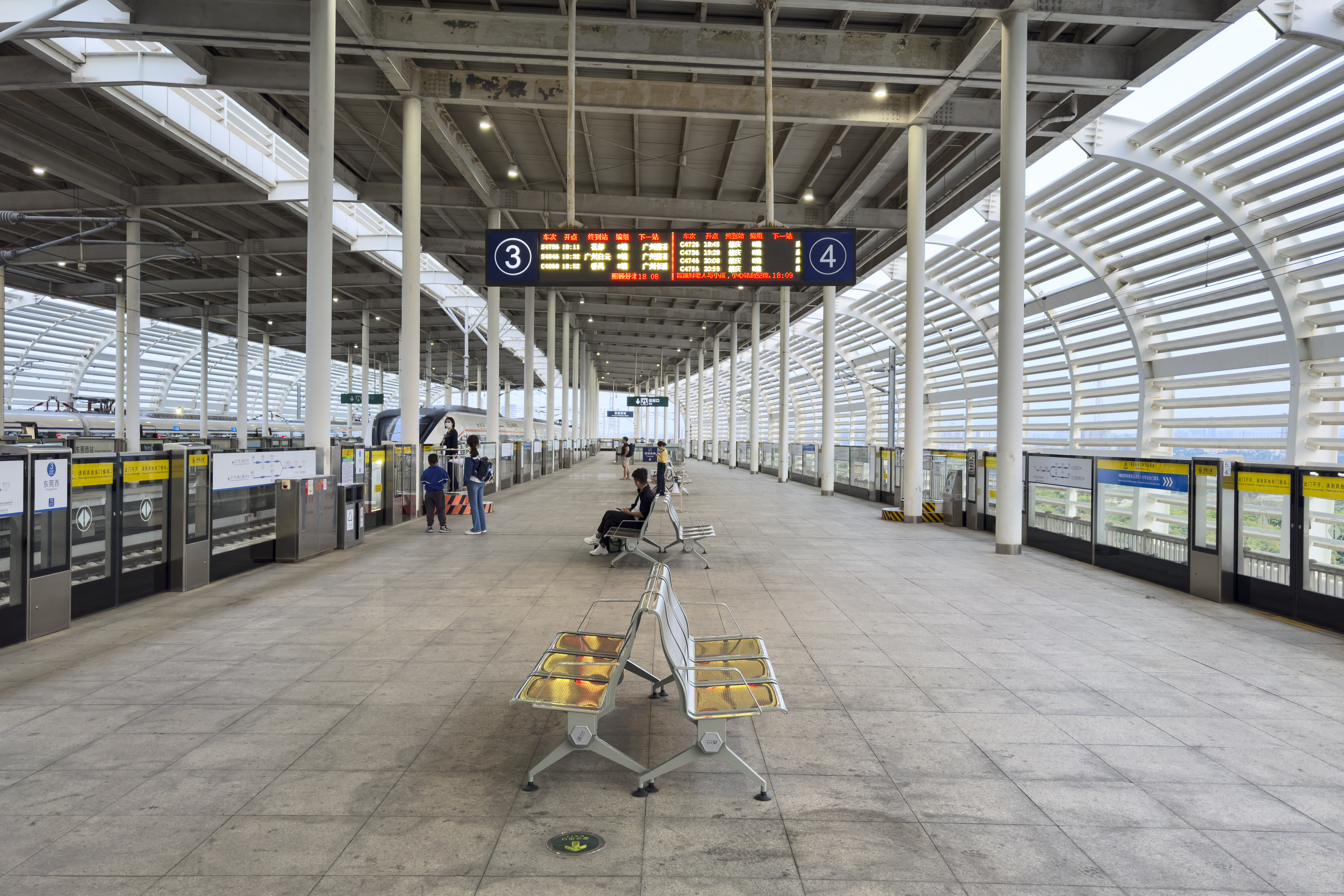
Guanghui intercity platform

== History ==
The station opened on 15 December 2019 along with the first stage of the Guangzhou–Shenzhen intercity railway and an extension to the Dongguan–Huizhou intercity railway.
