= Hongmei, Guangdong =

Hongmei 洪梅镇
- Town
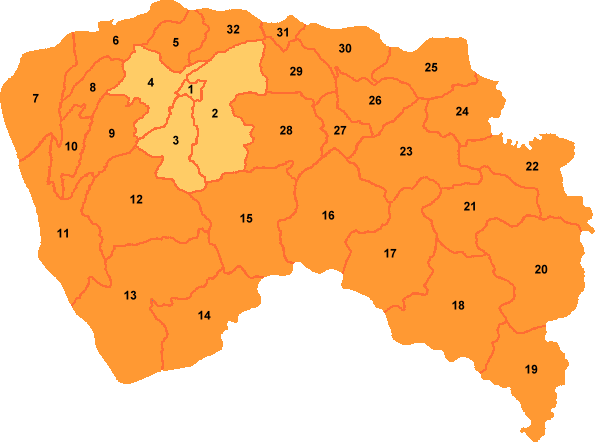
- Hongmei is labeled '10' on this map of Dongguan

- Location in Guangdong
- Coordinates (Hongmei government): 22°59′41″N 113°36′32″E
- Country: People's Republic of China
- Province: Guangdong
- Prefecture-level city: Dongguan
- Time zone: UTC+8 (China Standard)

Hongmei (Chinese: 洪梅镇; pinyin: Hóngméi zhèn) is a town under the jurisdiction of Dongguan prefecture-level city in the Pearl River Delta region of Guangdong province, China.
