= Pazhou railway station =

Guangdong Intercity railway station in Guangzhou, China

Pazhou 琶洲
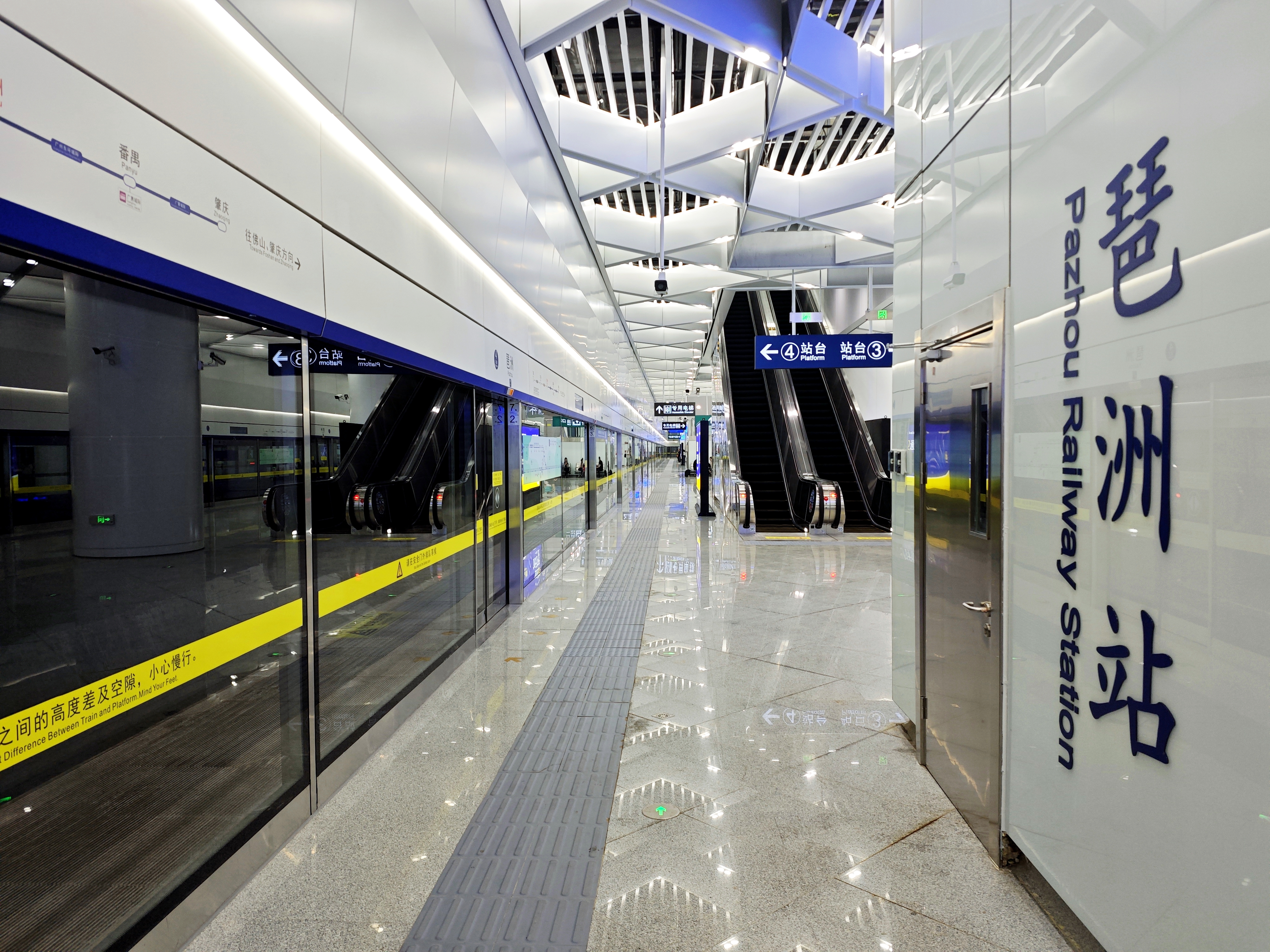
- Platform 4 (towards Panyu)

Chinese name
- Chinese: 琶洲站
Transcriptions
Standard Mandarin
- Hanyu Pinyin: Pázhōu Zhàn
Yue: Cantonese
- Yale Romanization: Paǎjāu Jaahm
- Jyutping: Paa^{4}zau^{1} Zaam^{6}
- Hong Kong Romanization: Whampoa Island station

General information
- Location: Canton Fair Complex East Road (會展东路); Pazhou Subdistrict, Haizhu District, Guangzhou, Guangdong; China
- Coordinates: 23°6′13.25″N 113°21′47.30″E
- Owner: Pearl River Delta Metropolitan Region intercity railway
- Operator: Guangdong Intercity
- Lines: Guangzhou East Ring intercity railway; Pazhou–Lianhuashan intercity railway
- Platforms: 4 (2 island platforms)
- Tracks: 4
- Connections: 8 11 Pazhou

Construction
- Structure type: Underground
- Accessible: Yes

Other information
- Station code: PTQ (Pinyin: PZH)

History
- Opened: 29 September 2025 (10 months ago)

Services
Preceding station	Pearl River Delta Metropolitan Region Intercity Railway	Following station
Keyunlu towards Huadu	Guangzhou East Ring intercity railway	Guangzhou Higher Education Mega Center towards Panyu
through to Guangzhou East Ring intercity railway	Pazhou–Lianhuashan intercity railway	Shenjing towards Guangzhou Lianhuashan
Transfer at Pazhou
Preceding station	Guangzhou Metro	Following station
Xingangdong towards Jiaoxin	Line 8 transfer at Pazhou	Wanshengwei Terminus
Yuancun Outer Circle	Line 11 transfer at Pazhou	Chisha Inner Circle
Location

Pazhou railway station (Chinese: 琶洲站; pinyin: Pázhōu Zhàn; Cantonese Yale: Paǎjāu Jaahm) is an underground railway interchange station between Guangzhou East Ring intercity railway and Pazhou–Lianhuashan intercity railway located in Haizhu District, Guangzhou, Guangdong, China. It opened on 29 September 2025.

== Features ==
The station has a pair of underground island platforms. The Guangzhou East Ring trains stop at the outer platforms, whilst the Palian (Pazhou-Lianhuashan intercity) trains stop at the inner platforms. It was constructed simultaneously with the Line 11 station.

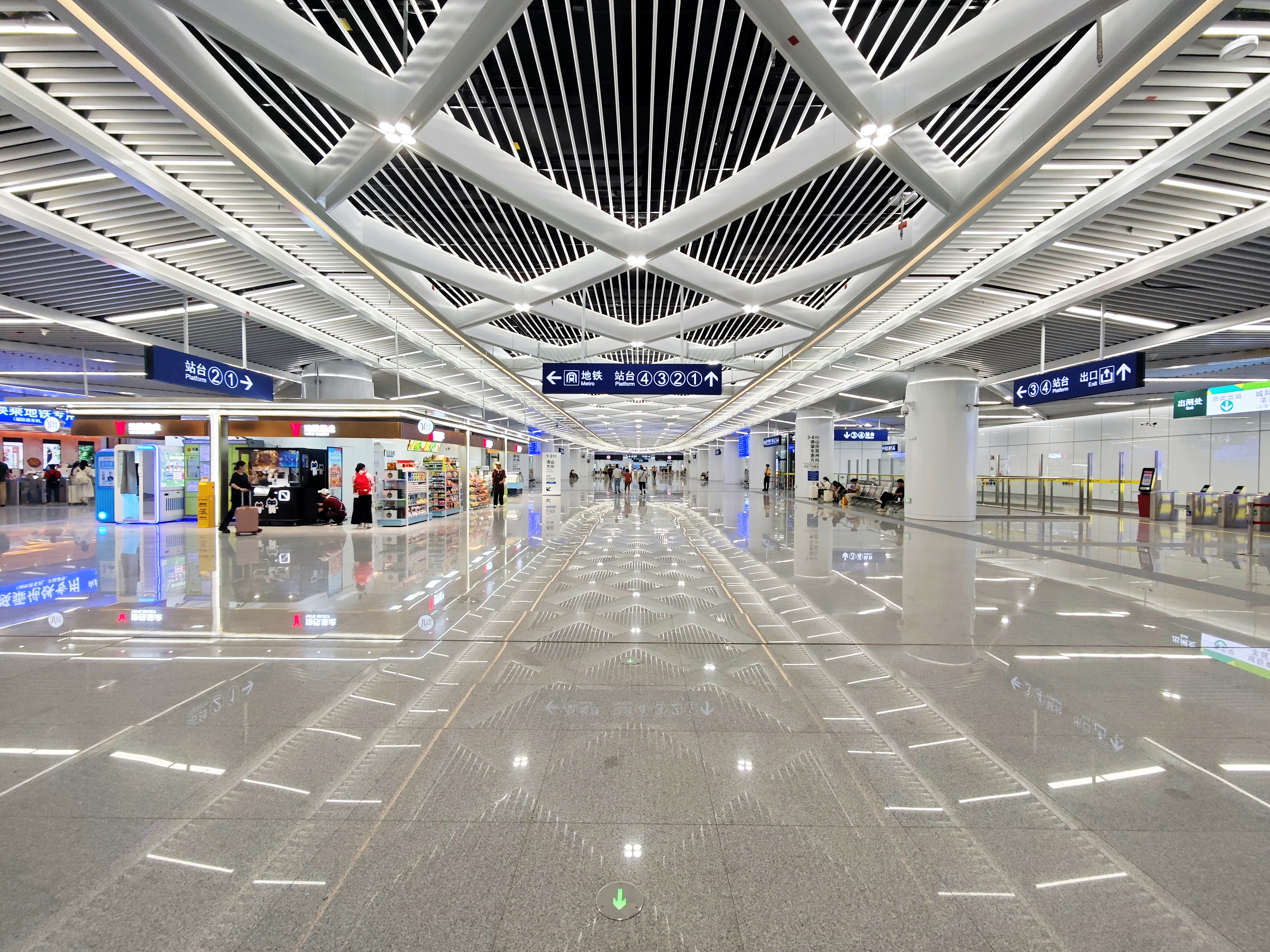
Concourse

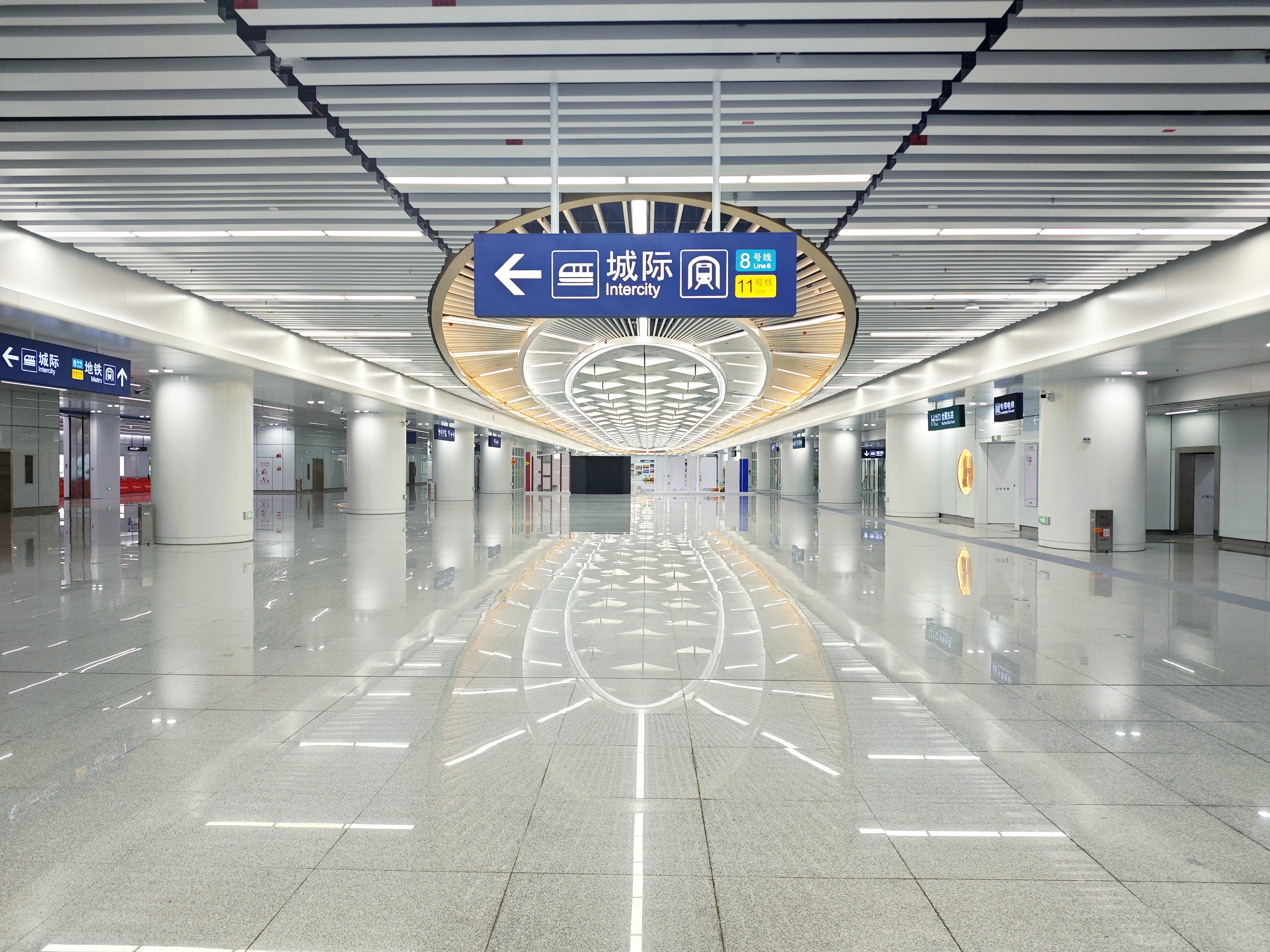
Transfer concourse

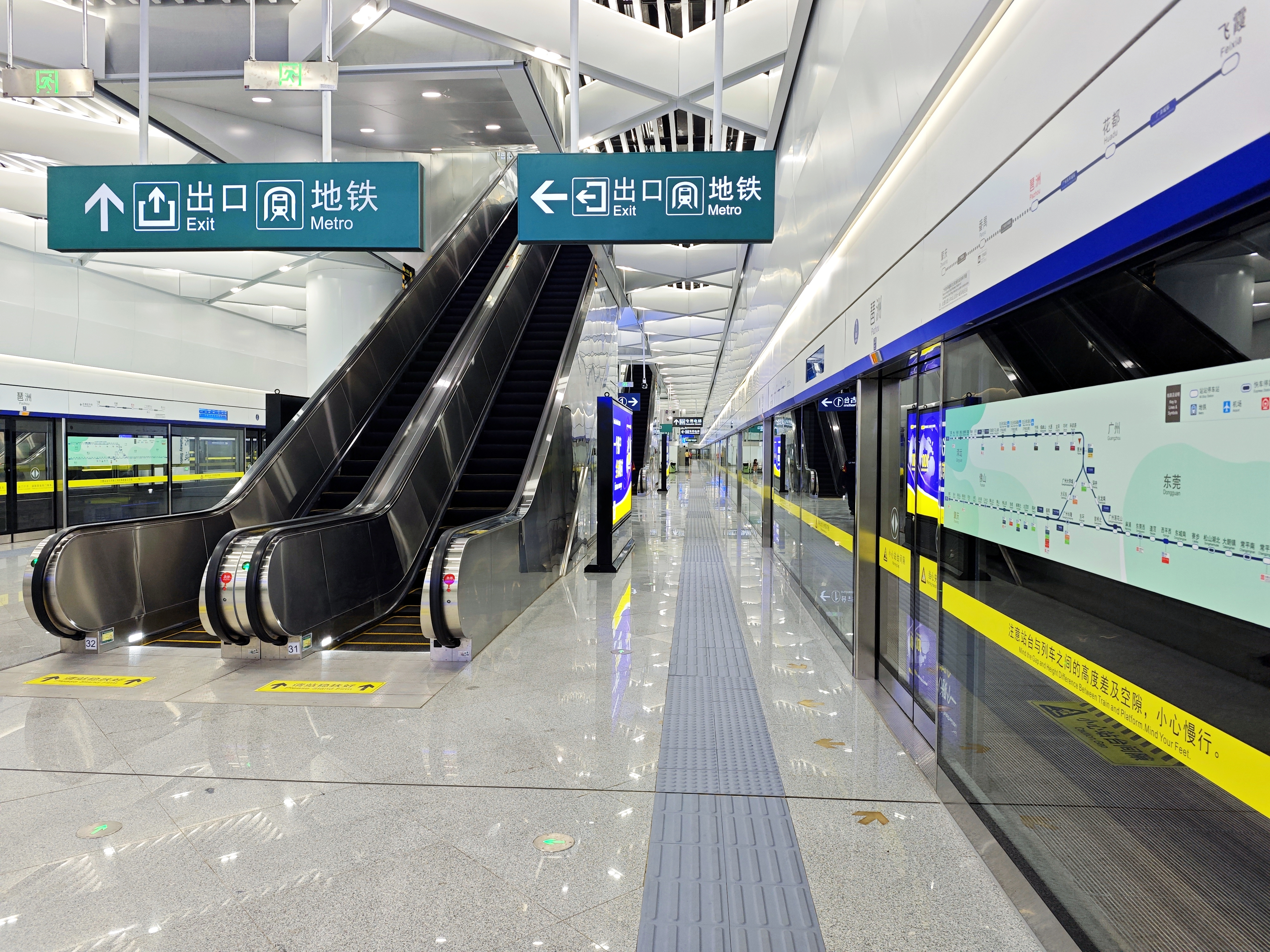
Platform 1

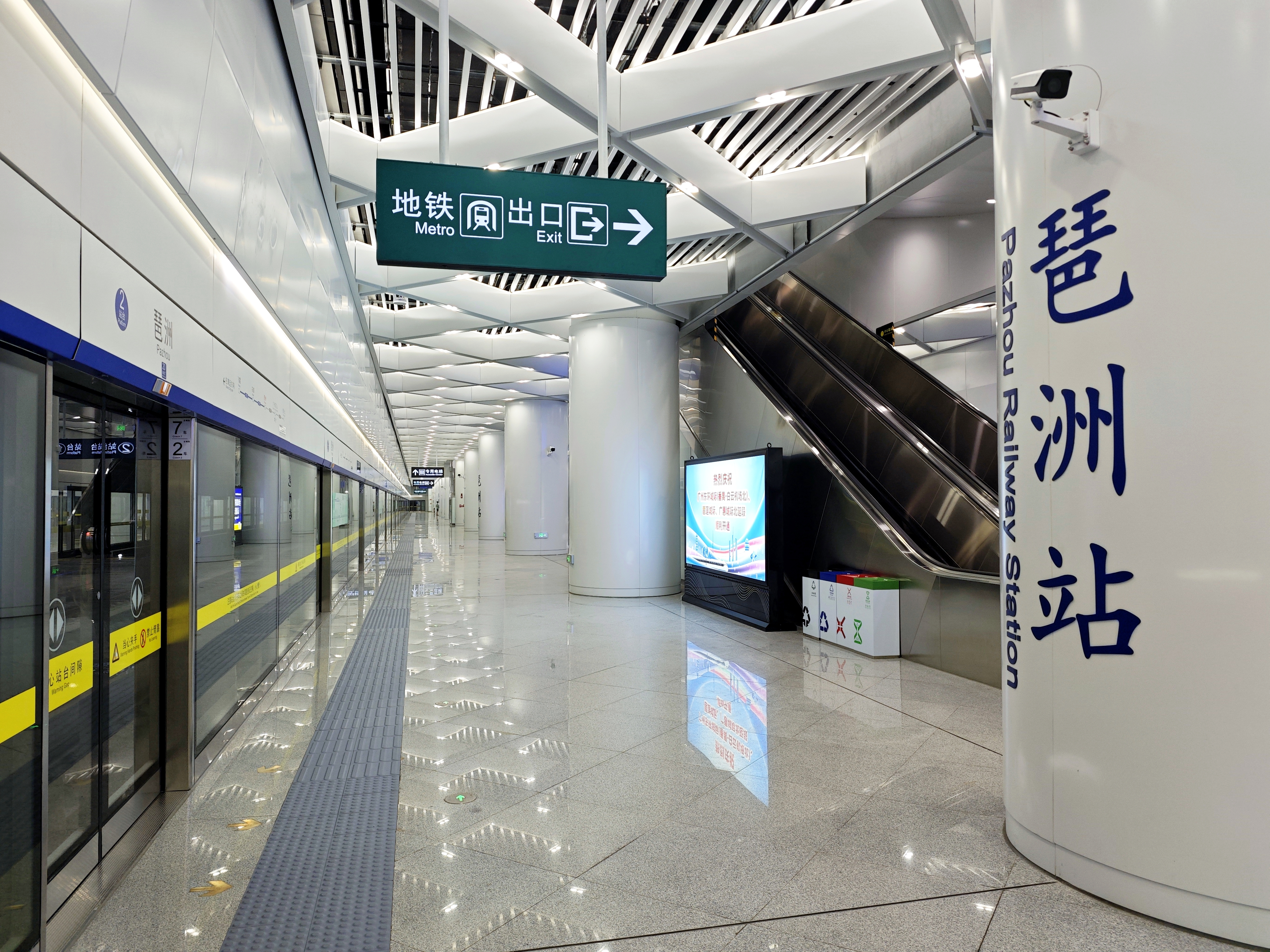
Platform 2

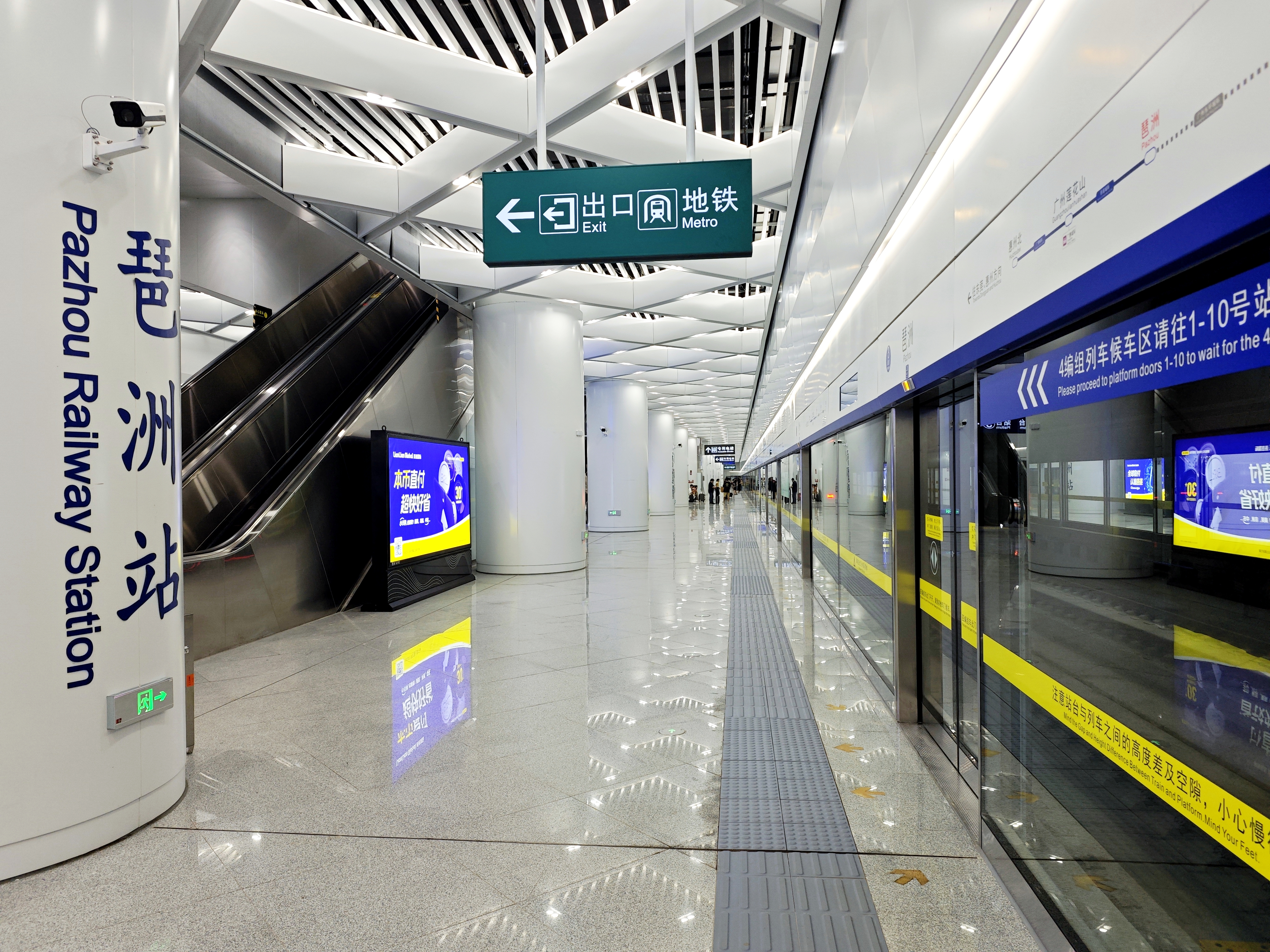
Platform 3

== Station layout ==
=== Entrances/exits ===
The station has 6 points of entry/exit. Due to the co-construction of the intercity station and the Metro Line 11 station, the entrance/exit letters of the intercity station extend from the "F" entrance/exit within the metro station range, which means for the intercity station, they start from "G". Exit H is accessible via elevator.

- G1: Canton Fair Complex East Road, Pazhou Pagoda, Xingang East Road
- G2: Canton Fair Complex East Road
- H: Canton Fair Complex East Road, Pazhou Avenue East
- J1: Pazhou Avenue East
- J2: Pazhou Avenue East, Canton Fair Complex East Road, Canton Fair Complex Area B
- K: Canton Fair Complex East Road, Canton Fair Complex Area B, Pazhou Hong Kong-Macau Passenger Port, THZ1 (via Canton Fair Complex East)
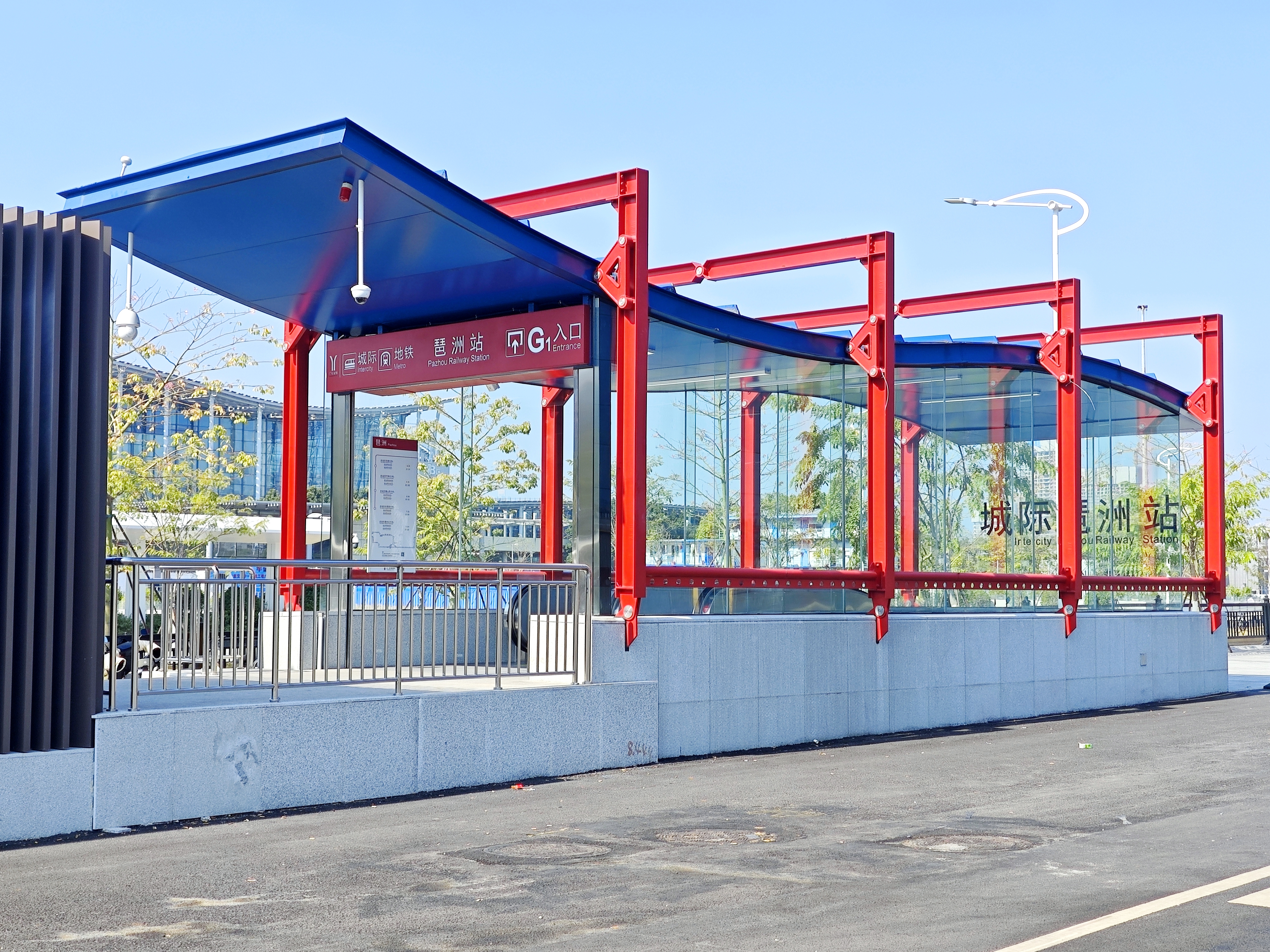
Entrance G1

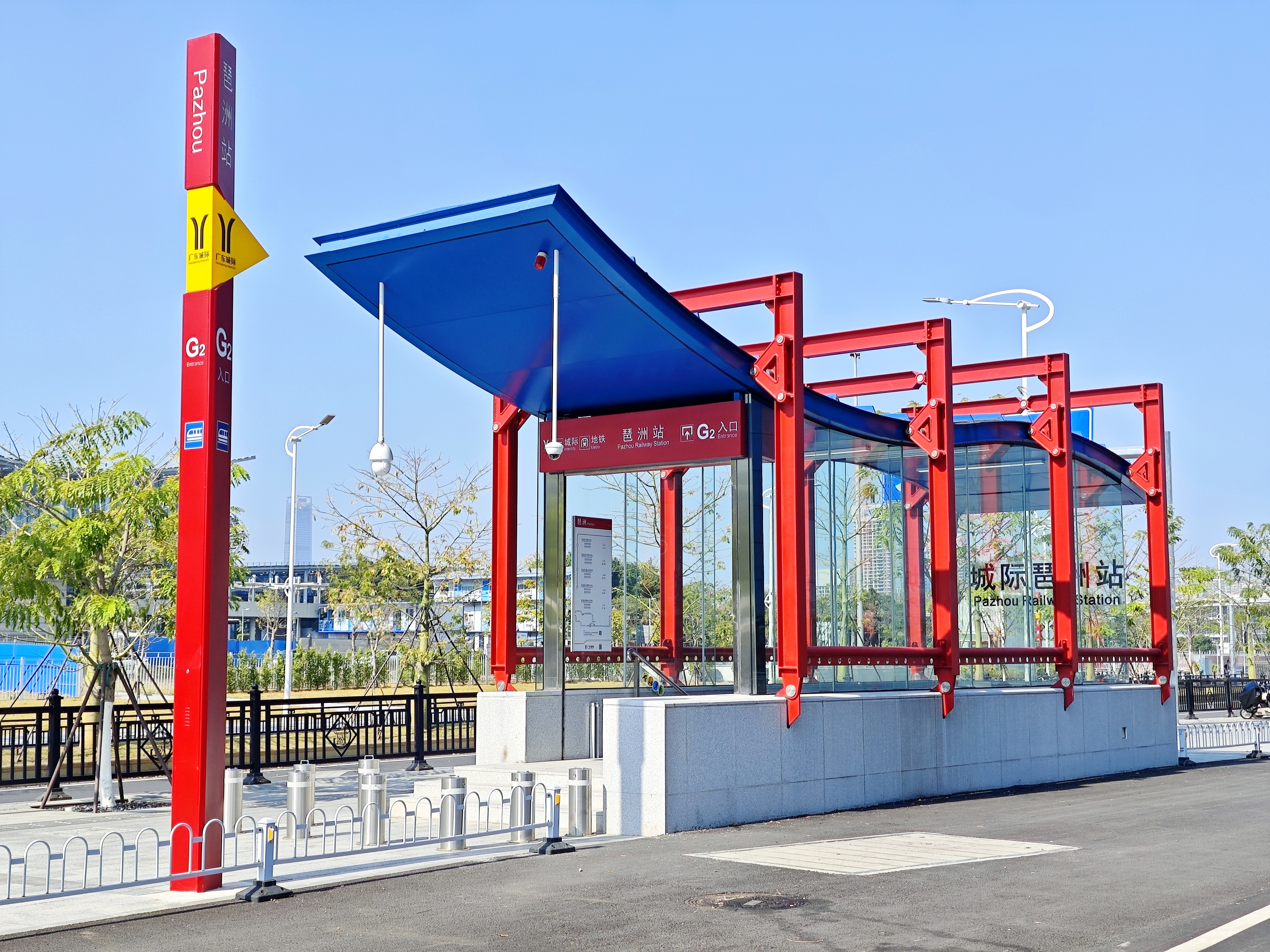
Entrance G2

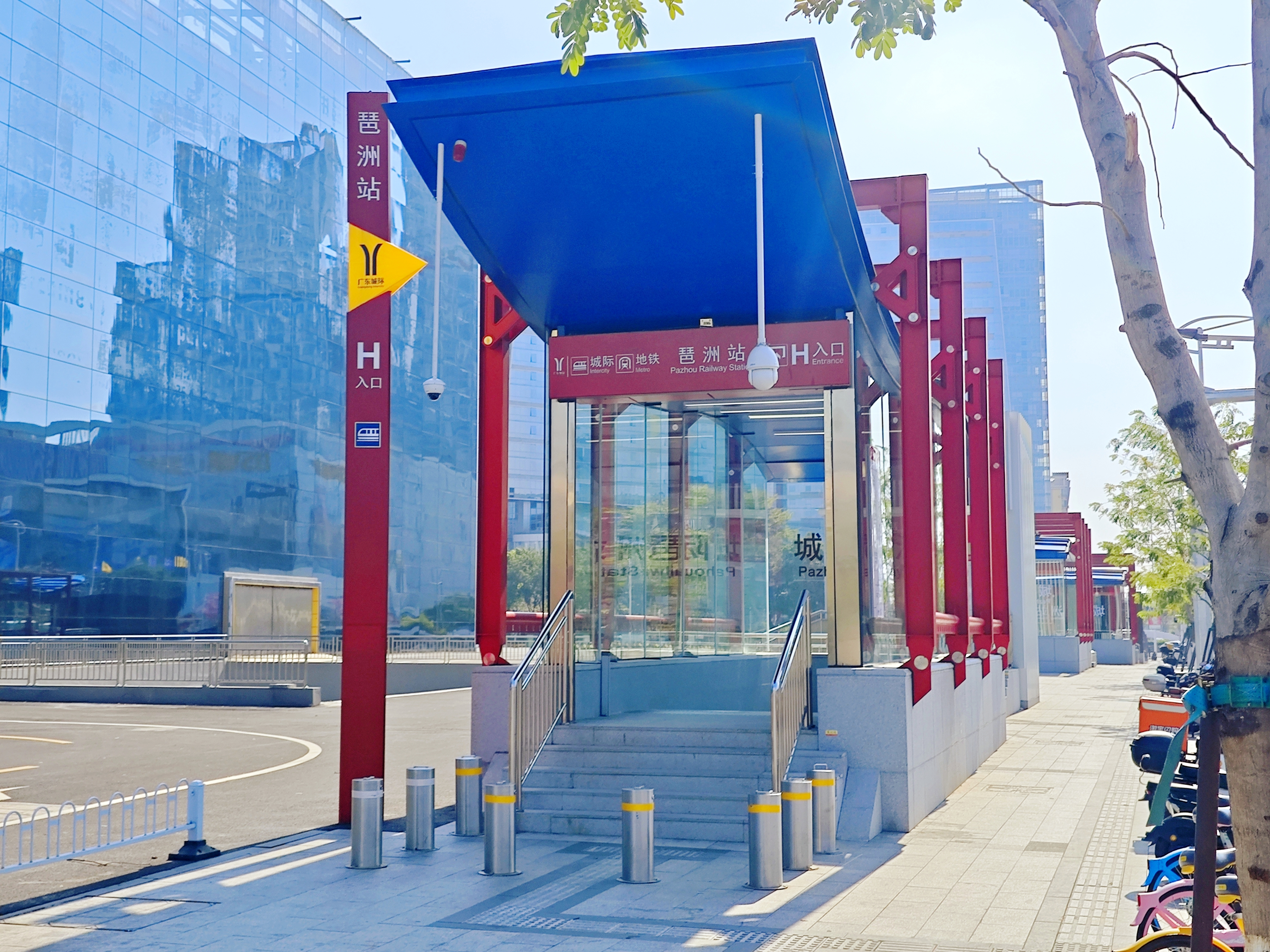
Entrance H

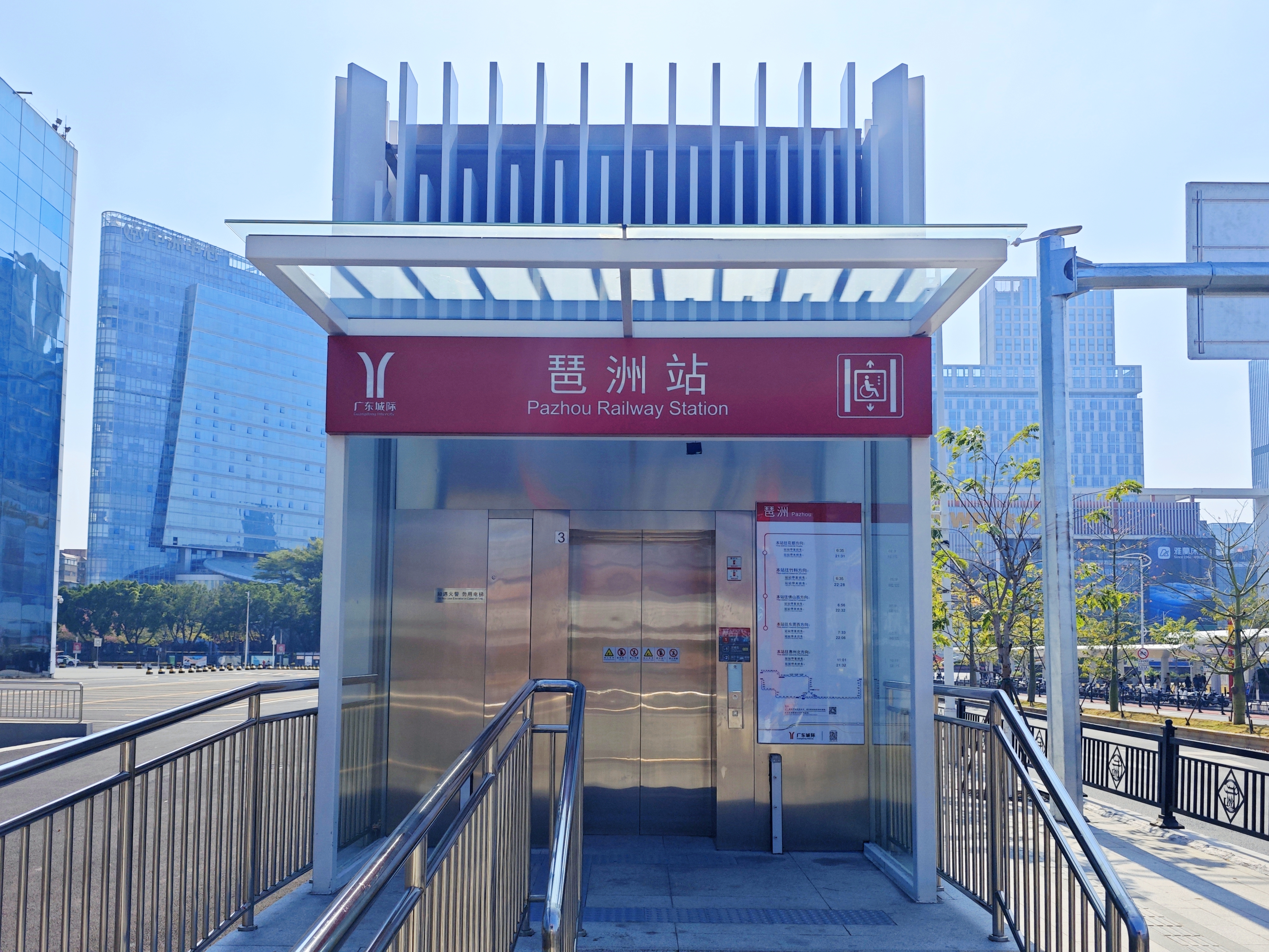
Elevator of Entrance H

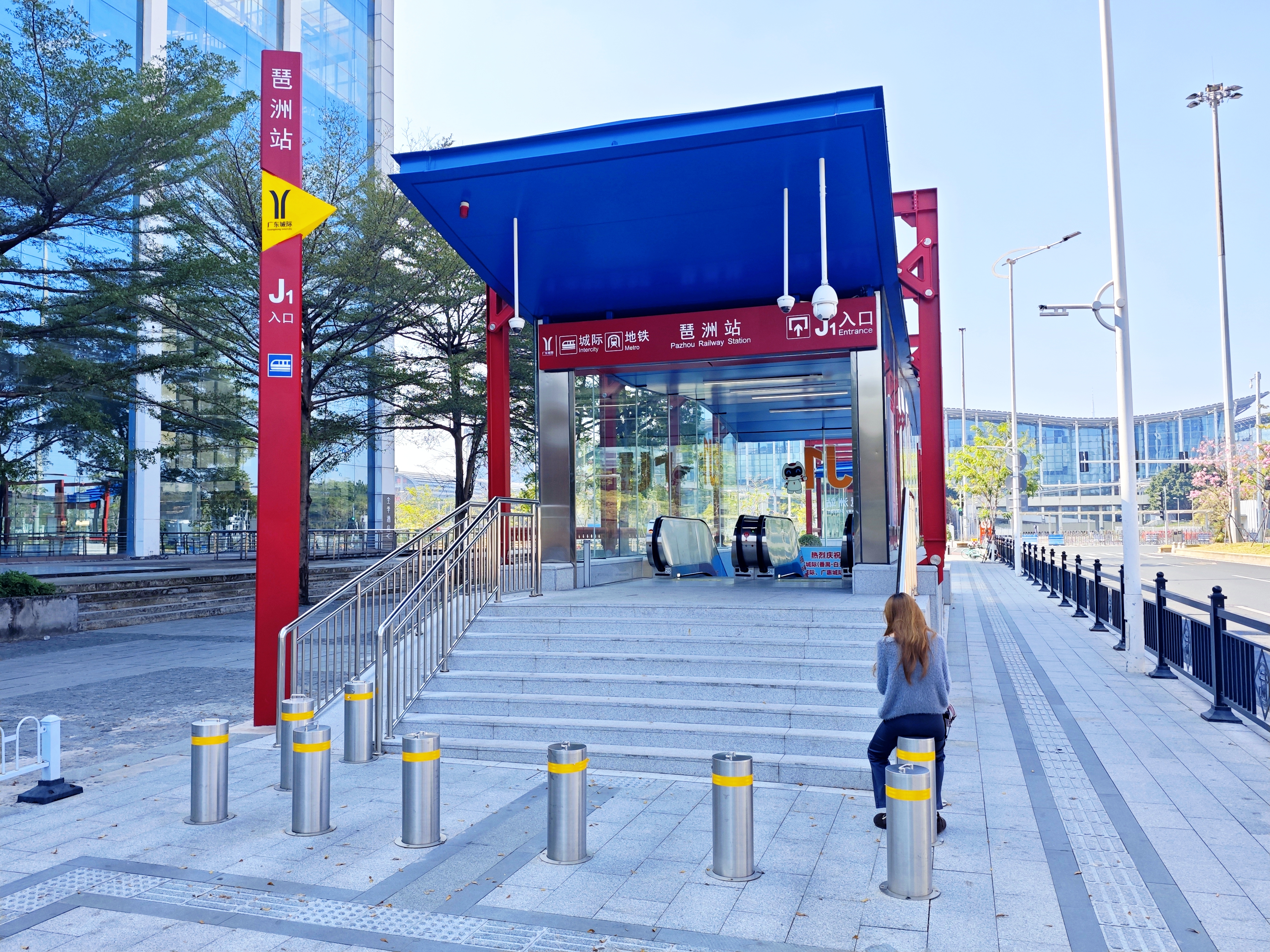
Entrance J1

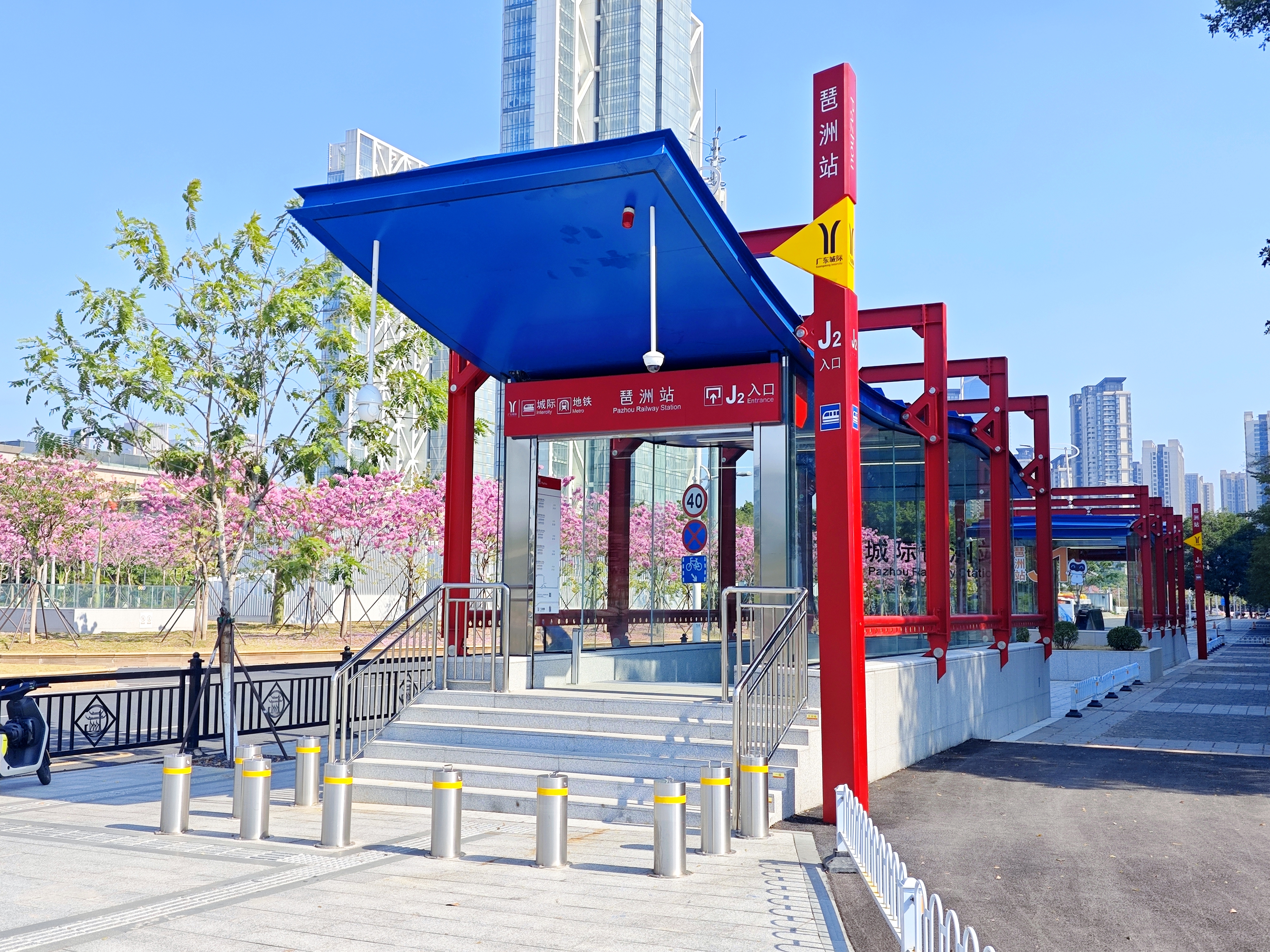
Entrance J2

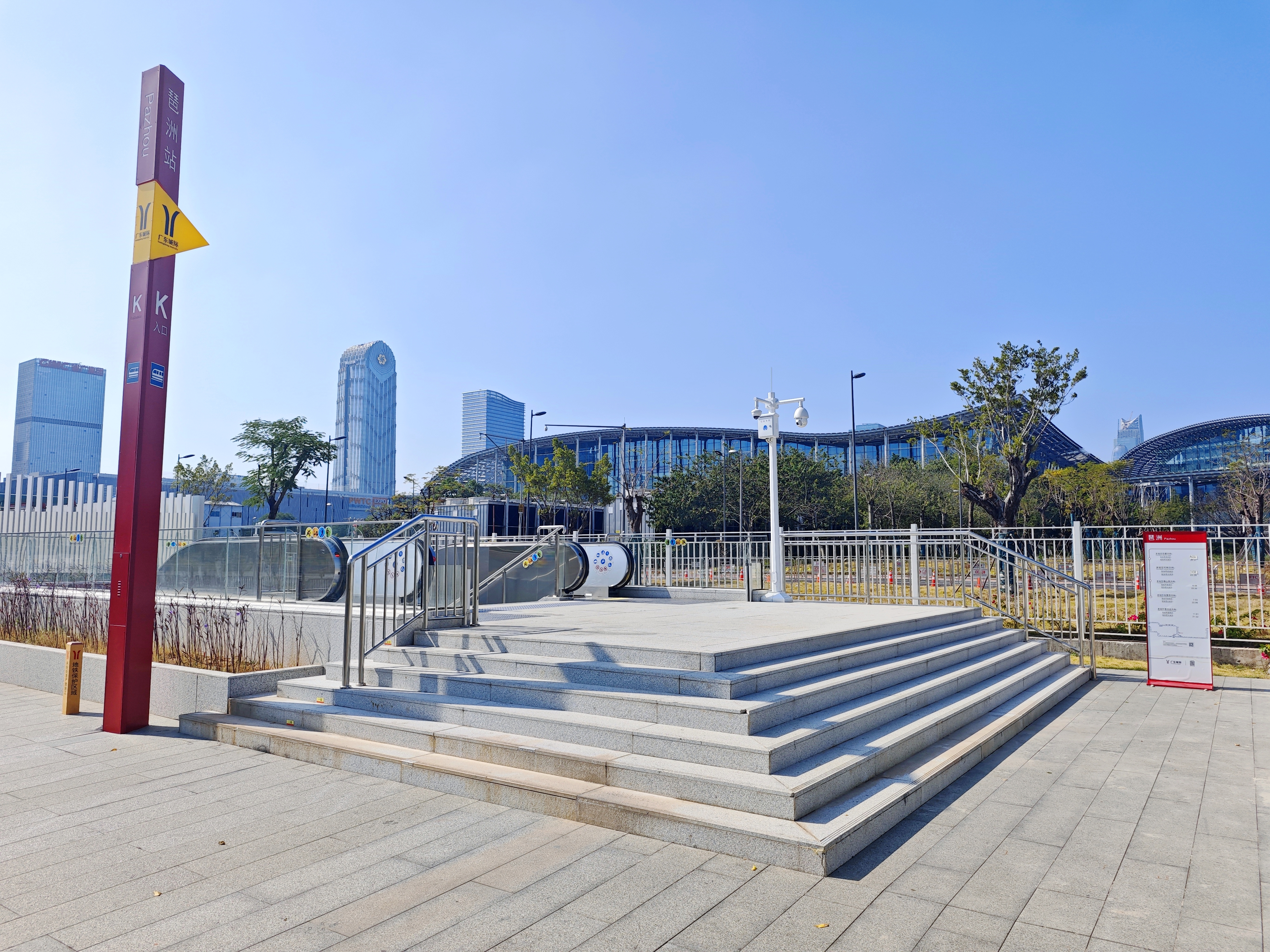
Entrance K

== Transfer ==
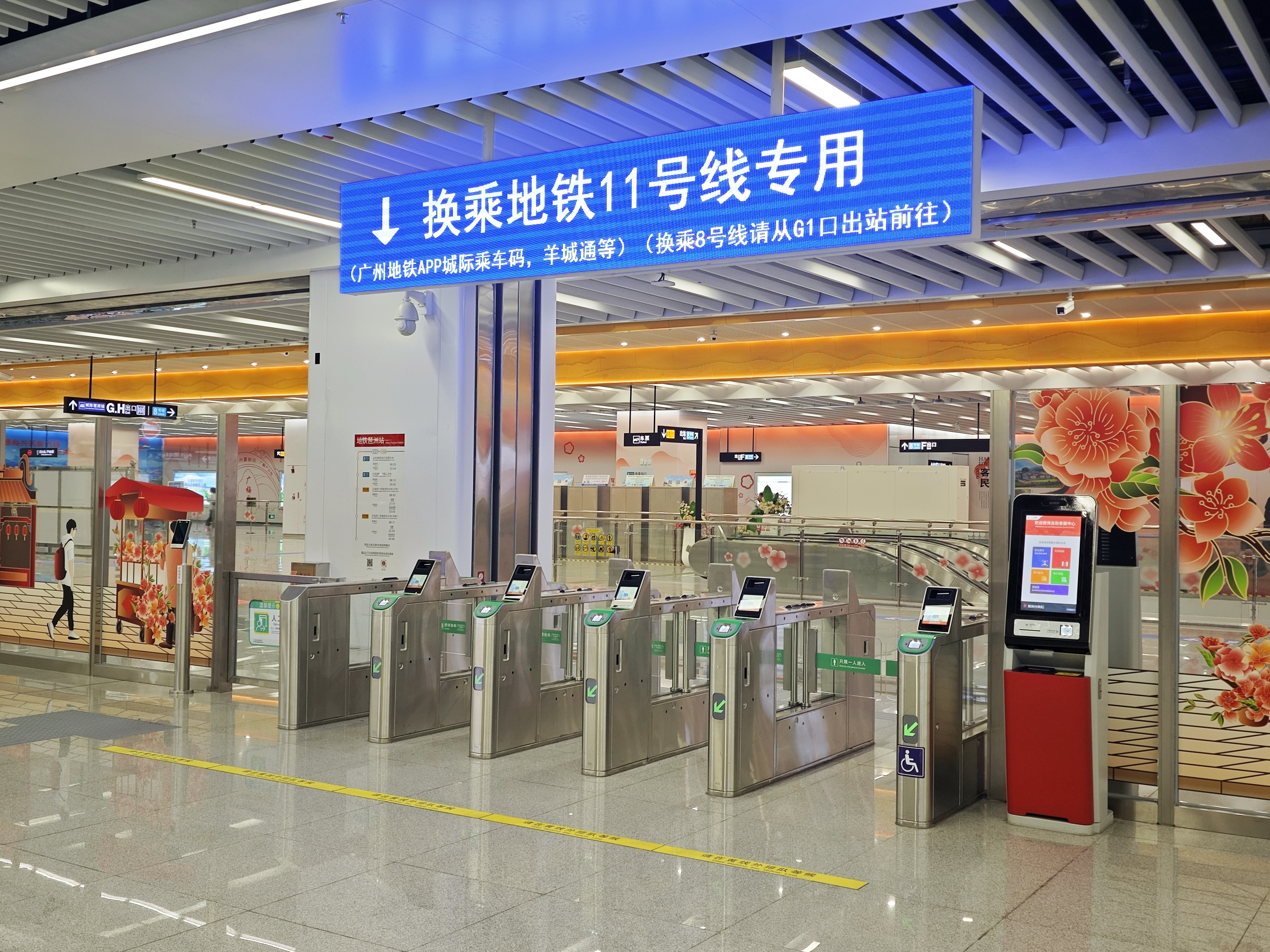
Transfer gate

There is transfer available to the Metro Line 11 station through the concourse without the need for another security check. However, the two ticketing systems need to be switched, and passengers holding transportation cards or boarding codes can check their tickets at the special gates and only need to pass through one gate to complete the transfer. However, if they hold other ticket types, they need to exit the metro station exit gate and enter via the intercity station gate.

== History ==
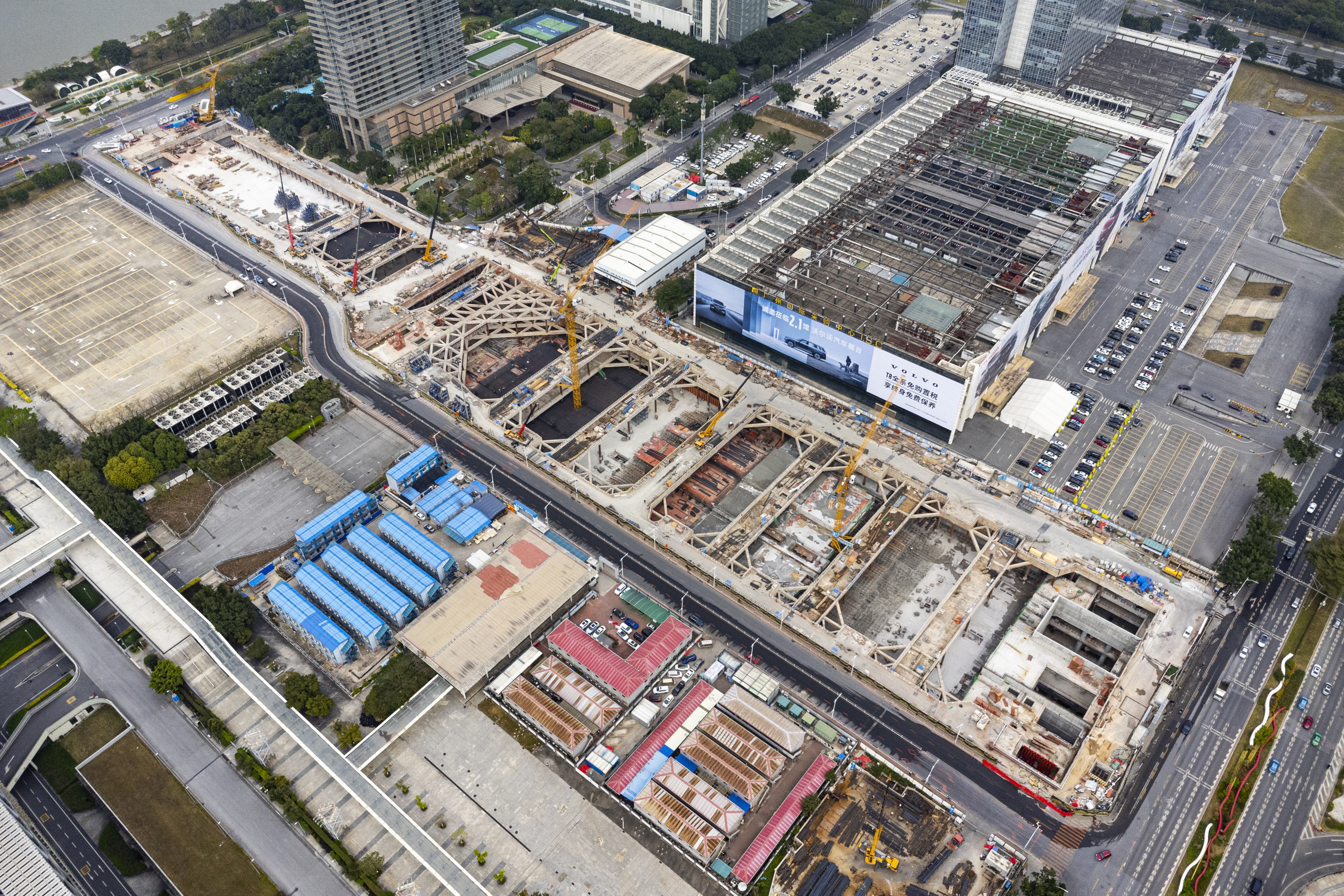
Construction site (January 2023)

The up-line shield tunnel from this station to Financial City station (now Keyunlu) started tunneling on 30 June 2021. It successfully crossed the Pearl River front channel on 7 May 2022 and broke through on 9 October 2022. The down-line shield tunnel from this station to the No. 9 shaft (Guanzhou Island Shaft) broke through on 19 February 2023. The up-line tunnel from the opposite direction broke through on 11 March the same year.

In April 2023, the station topped out.

On 29 September 2025, the station opened.
