= Guangzhou–Huizhou intercity railway =

Railway line in Guangdong, China

Guangzhou-Huizhou intercity railway

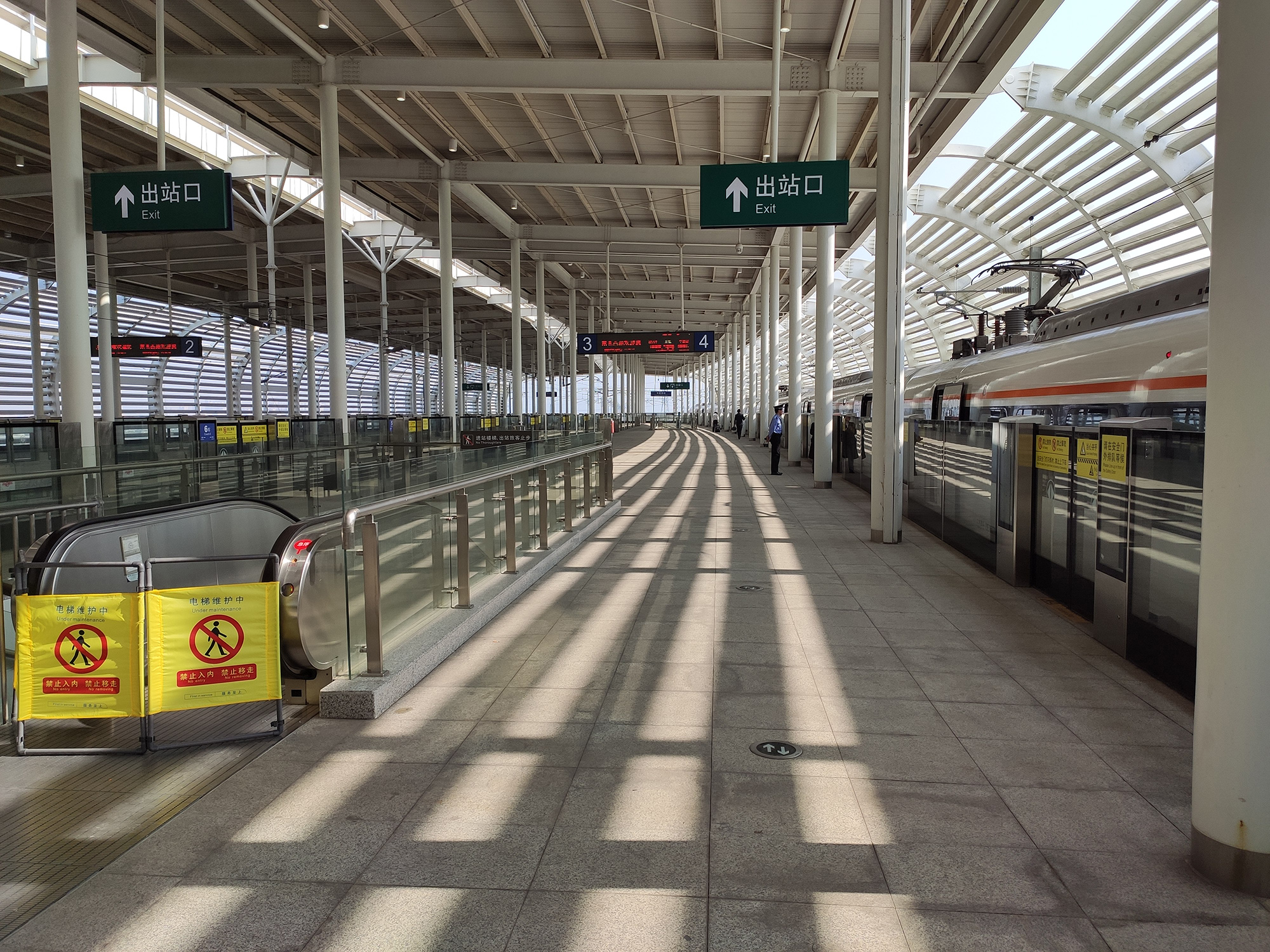
- Dongguan West station platform

Overview
- Native name: 广惠城际铁路
- Status: Operational
- Owner: Guangdong Pearl River Delta Intercity Railway Co., Ltd.
- Locale: Guangdong Province, China
- Termini: Panyu; Huizhou North
- Stations: 24

Service
- Type: Intercity Higher-speed rail
- System: Pearl River Delta Metropolitan Region intercity railway
- Services: 1
- Operator(s): CR Guangzhou (until 23 January 2024); Guangdong Intercity (since 23 January 2024)
- Rolling stock: CRH6 EMU

History
- Opened: March 30, 2016 (Xiaojinkou–Changping East)
- Last extension: December 28, 2017 (Changping East–Daojiao); December 15, 2019 (Daojiao–Dongguan West); May 26, 2024 (Dongguan West–Panyu); September 29, 2025 (Xiaojinkou–Huizhou North)

Technical
- Line length: 146.6 km (91.1 mi)
- Track gauge: 1,435 mm (4 ft 8 1/2 in) standard gauge
- Minimum radius: 2,200 m (1.4 mi; 7,200 ft) (normal curves); 2,000 m (1.2 mi; 6,600 ft) (tight curves)
- Electrification: 25 kV 50 Hz AC (Overhead lines)
- Operating speed: 200 km/h (125 mph)
- Maximum incline: 3.0%

Guangzhou–Huizhou intercity railway, also known as the Guanghui intercity railway, is a regional railway within Guangdong province, China. It runs between the cities of Guangzhou and Huizhou in the Pearl River Delta (PRD). It is part of a larger radiating intercity rail transit network, called Pearl River Delta Metropolitan Region intercity railway, across the PRD region, directly connecting with the Guangzhou–Shenzhen intercity railway. Route length is 139.8 kilometres (86.9 mi), with an estimated construction budget of 25.3 billion RMB. The construction period was planned to take three and a half years, actual construction started in May 2009 and was completed in June 2013, but the line wasn't opened until 2016. Three stations were renovated and 14 new stations were built along the route. It was built with a design speed of 200 kilometres per hour (125 mph). The Xiaojinkou–Changping East section started operations on 30 March 2016. The Dongguan West–Panyu section opened on 26 May 2024.

== History ==
8 May 2009	Construction in Changping, Dongguan officially started, with an original expectation to be opened for traffic by 2013.
7 June 2013	Construction is completed and test runs are due to begin in 2014 with whole project opened by the end of 2015.
30 March 2016	Xiaojinkou–Changping East section started operations.
28 December 2017	Changping East–Daojiao started operations.
15 December 2019	Daojiao–Dongguan West started operations.
1 November 2023	Guangdong Intercity got operation license of Guanghui intercity railway.
23 January 2024	Guangdong Intercity company has taken-over the operation from China Railway Guangzhou Group.
26 May 2024	Dongguan West–Panyu started operations.
29 September 2025	Xiaojinkou–Huizhou North started operations.

== Route ==
Guanghui intercity railway is an East-West railway that starts at Panyu railway station, next to Guangzhou South railway station, in Guangzhou's Panyu District. It then goes eastward under the Pearl River through Machong and Hongmei to reach Dongguan West in the Hongmei area of Dongguan. This will be a major interchange with the Guangzhou–Shenzhen intercity railway and Dongguang Metro's Line 1, set to open in 2025. It then moves eastward through the Dongguan regions of Daojiao, then Nancheng, Dongcheng, Liaobu, Songshan Lake, Dalang, Changping and Xiegang. Crossing into Huizhou's Huicheng District it then passes through Lilin, Chenjiang and Huihuan before arriving at Huizhou railway station. It then veers north-west to terminate at Huizhou North railway station. Total length of the route is 146.6 km (91.1 mi), 31.952 km (19.854 mi) in Guangzhou, 78.160 km (48.566 mi) in Dongguan and 38.808 km (24.114 mi) in Huizhou. Elevated sections of track total 79.563 km (49.438 mi), with 6.586 km (4.092 mi) at ground level and 60.43 km (37.55 mi) being underground.

== Stations ==
Originally approved to build 16 stations, the Huizhou Municipal Railway Construction Investment Group Co. Ltd and the Guangzhou Railway Company agreed to build an additional station at Huizhou's West Lake.

Station			Distance km		Connections & transfers		Location
Code	Name	Chinese	Distance km		Pearl River Delta ICR	Metro	Location
↑ through train to Guangzhou–Zhaoqing intercity railway Guangzhao
PYA	Panyu	番禺	0.00	0.00	ER; IZQ Guangzhu	2 7 22 2 Guangzhou South	Panyu, Guangzhou
GCA	Guangzhou Changlong	广州长隆	6.56	6.56		3 7 Hanxi Changlong	Panyu, Guangzhou
DHA	Donghuan	东环	4.21	10.77			Panyu, Guangzhou
GQA	Guanqiao North (Guanqiaobei)	官桥北	8.35	19.12		4 Guanqiao	Panyu, Guangzhou
GLA	Guangzhou Lianhuashan	广州莲花山	5.48	24.60	PL (through service to ER )	8	Panyu, Guangzhou
MIA	Machong	麻涌	9.02	33.62			Machong, Dongguan
WGQ	Dongguan West (Dongguanxi)	东莞西	5.36	38.98	SS		Hongmei, Dongguan
RRQ	Daojiao	道滘	3.97	42.95			Daojiao, Dongguan
EGQ	Xiping West (Xipingxi)	西平西	9.90	52.85		2 Xiping	Nancheng, Dongguan
IYQ	Dongcheng South (Dongchengnan)	东城南	3.43	56.28			Dongcheng, Dongguan
LTQ	Liaobu	寮步	8.63	64.91			Liaobu, Dongguan
KUQ	Songshanhu North (Songshanhubei)	松山湖北	6.07	70.98			Liaobu, Dongguan
KOQ	Dalang Town (Dalangzhen)	大朗镇	5.61	76.59			Dalang, Dongguan
FPQ	Changping South (Changpingnan)	常平南	6.11	82.7			Changping, Dongguan
FQQ	Changping East (Changpingdong)	常平东	4.27	86.97			Changping, Dongguan
ZRQ	Zhangmutou East (Zhangmutoudong)	樟木头东	6.88	93.85			Zhangmutou, Dongguan
KPQ	Yinping	银瓶	5.49	99.34			Xiegang, Dongguan
KBQ	Lilin North (Lilinbei)	沥林北	7.89	107.23			Huicheng, Huizhou
KKQ	Chenjiang South (Chenjiangnan)	陈江南	11.60	118.83			Huicheng, Huizhou
KHQ	Huihuan	惠环	4.93	123.76			Huicheng, Huizhou
KFQ	Longfeng	龙丰	5.09	128.85			Huicheng, Huizhou
WDQ	Xihu East (Xihudong)	西湖东	2.88	131.73			Huicheng, Huizhou
KZQ	Yunshan	云山	3.05	134.78			Huicheng, Huizhou
NKQ	Xiaojinkou	小金口	5.04	139.82			Huicheng, Huizhou
HUA	Huizhou North	惠州北	6.82	146.64			Huicheng, Huizhou

== Incidents ==
=== Songshan station jerry incident ===
A man surnamed Liu broke the construction side of the Songshanhu North station to cut corners, but the construction company building the site pay a prescription charge of Mr. Yang Zhenggang Songshanhu report indicates that this is malicious, and communicate the results to identify after the fact.
