= Changping South railway station =

Railway station in Dongguan, Guangdong, China

Changpingnan 常平南
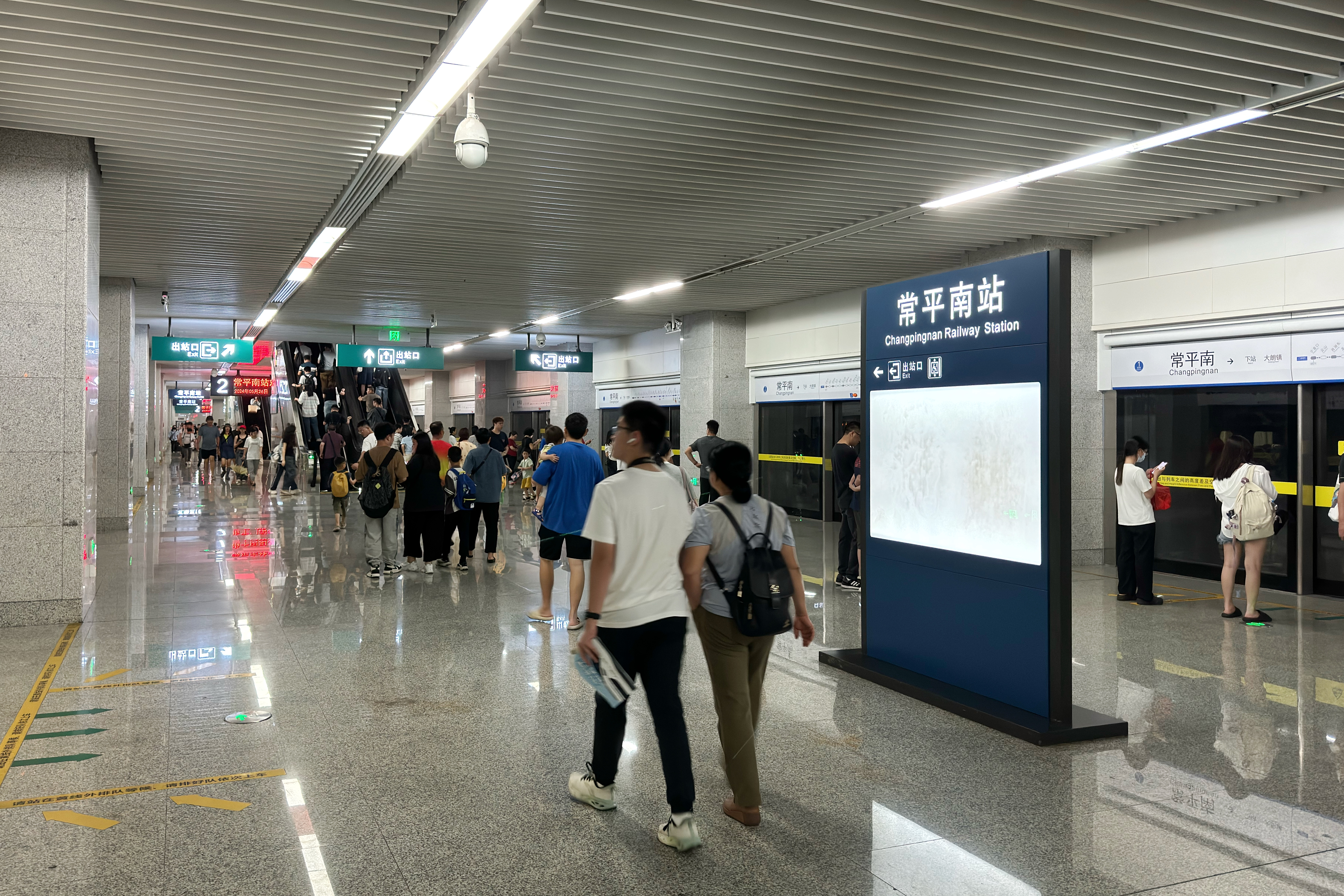
- Platform

Chinese name
- Chinese: 常平南站
Transcriptions
Standard Mandarin
- Hanyu Pinyin: Chángpíng Nán Zhàn
Yue: Cantonese
- Jyutping: Soeng^{4}ping^{4} Naam^{4} Zaam^{6}

General information
- Location: Changping Boulevard (常平大道), Banshi Estate (板石村), Changping, Dongguan, Guangdong; China
- Coordinates: 22°58′41″N 114°00′09″E
- Owner: Pearl River Delta Metropolitan Region intercity railway
- Operator: Guangdong Intercity Railway Operation Co., Ltd.
- Line: Guangzhou–Huizhou intercity railway
- Platforms: 2 (1 island platform)
- Tracks: 2

Construction
- Structure type: Underground
- Accessible: Yes

Other information
- Station code: FPQ (Pinyin: CPN)

History
- Opened: 28 December 2017; 8 years ago

Services
Preceding station	Pearl River Delta Metropolitan Region Intercity Railway	Following station
Dalang Town towards Panyu	Guangzhou–Huizhou intercity railway	Changping East towards Huizhou North
Location

Changping South railway station (Chinese: 常平南站; pinyin: Chángpíng Nán Zhàn; Jyutping: Soeng^{4}ping^{4} Naam^{4} Zaam^{6}) is a railway station in Changping, Dongguan, Guangdong, China. It opened on 28 December 2017.

The station has 4 exits planned, lettered A-D. Exits A and D opened when the station opened. Exit B has been built but not opened, and Exit C, which has not yet started construction, is reserved for connecting to a future Dongguan Rail Transit station. In addition, there is a passage connecting to Xianglong Tiandi Plaza next to Exit A, but it is currently temporarily closed due to the latter's inadequate fire safety requirements.

== History ==
The station was named Changping during planning and construction and was originally an elevated station. In 2010, after the Ministry of Railways intervened in the construction of the Pearl River Delta Metropolitan Region intercity railway, the line scheme was redesigned. Finally, at the suggestion of Dongguan City and the towns and streets along the line, in order to avoid cutting the urban planning, the urban area of Dongguan and the Liaobu and Changping sections were changed from elevated to underground, so the station was adjusted to an underground station, and moved about 1km eastward to the current site. However, due to the poor geological conditions of Changping, there were many collapse accidents during the construction of the Changping section of the Dongguan-Huizhou intercity, which affected the construction period of the station.

In order to avoid the same name as the national railway station, the station was named Changping South at the end of 2015.

== Transfer ==
Changping Station of the Beijing-Kowloon railway is located on the north side of the station, but the straight-line distance between the two stations is about 1.3 kilometers, and the transfer convenience is not as good as that of the next station, Changping East/Dongguan East, so the operator did not mark this station as an interchange station with the China Railway. The planned Dongguan Rail Transit Line 3 plans to set up a station near this station, and the station has reserved the conditions for a transfer passageway.

== Gallery ==
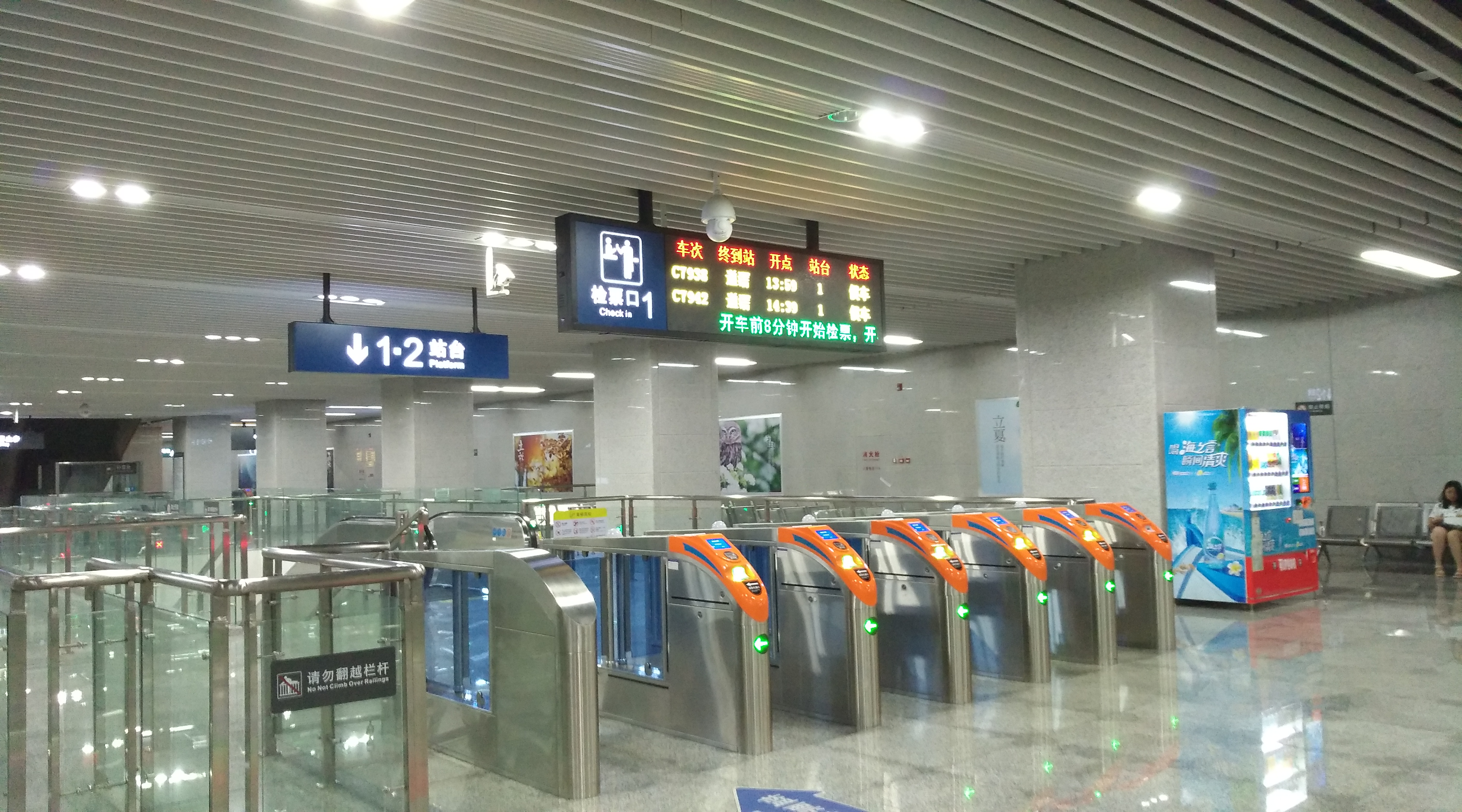
Concourse turnstiles

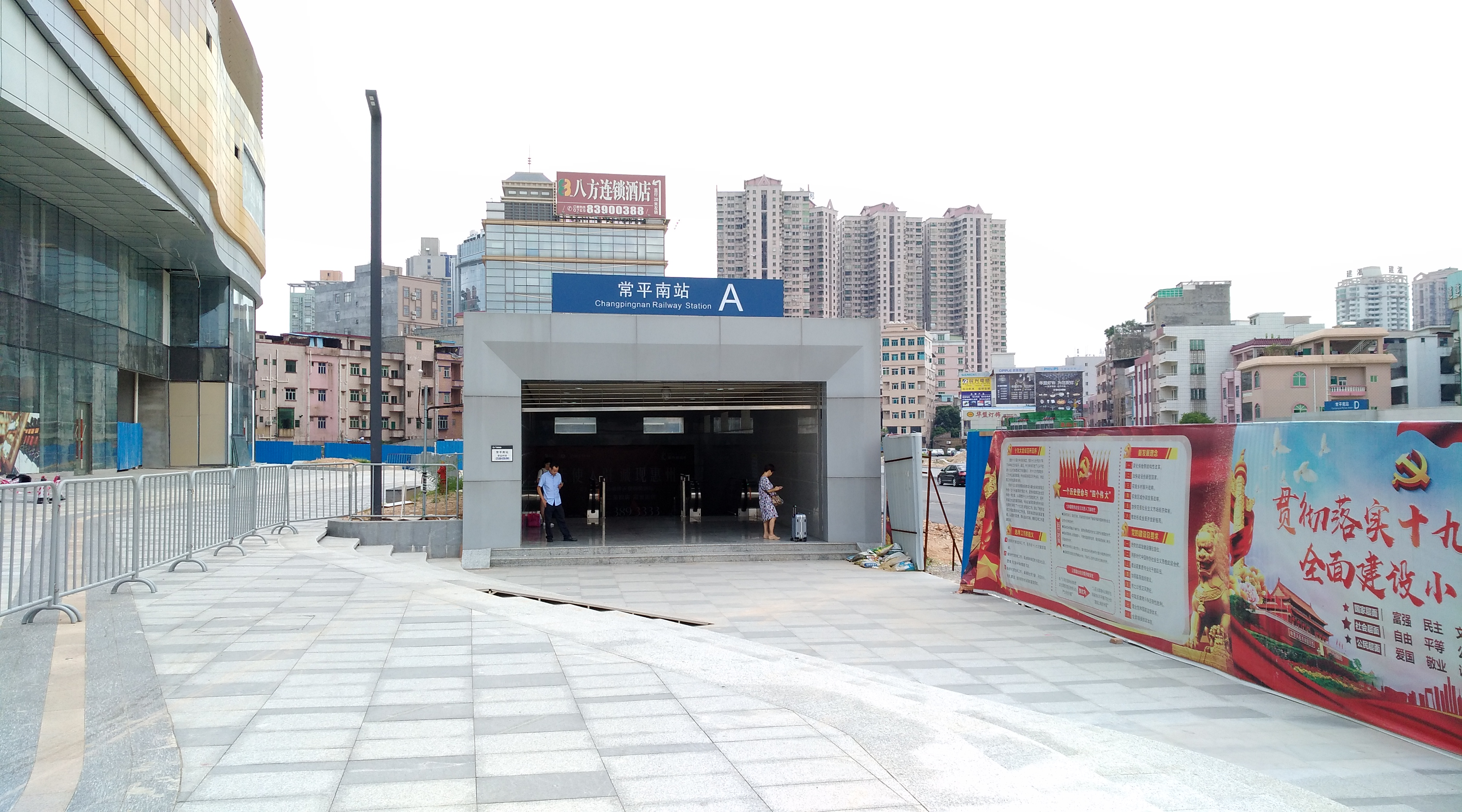
Exit A
