= KOQ (disambiguation) =

KOQ most commonly refers to The King of Queens, an American sitcom.

KOQ or koq may also refer to:

- Dalang Town railway station (station code KOQ), on the Dongguan–Huizhou intercity railway, Guangdong, China
- Kids on Q or KOQ!, a Philippine Television children's programme
- Kota language (Gabon) (ISO 639-3: koq), a Bantu language
- Köthen Airport (IATA code KOQ), Köthen, Saxony-Anhalt, Germany, see List of airports by IATA airport code: K
