= Yinping railway station =

Railway station in Dongguan, Guangdong, China

Yinping 银瓶
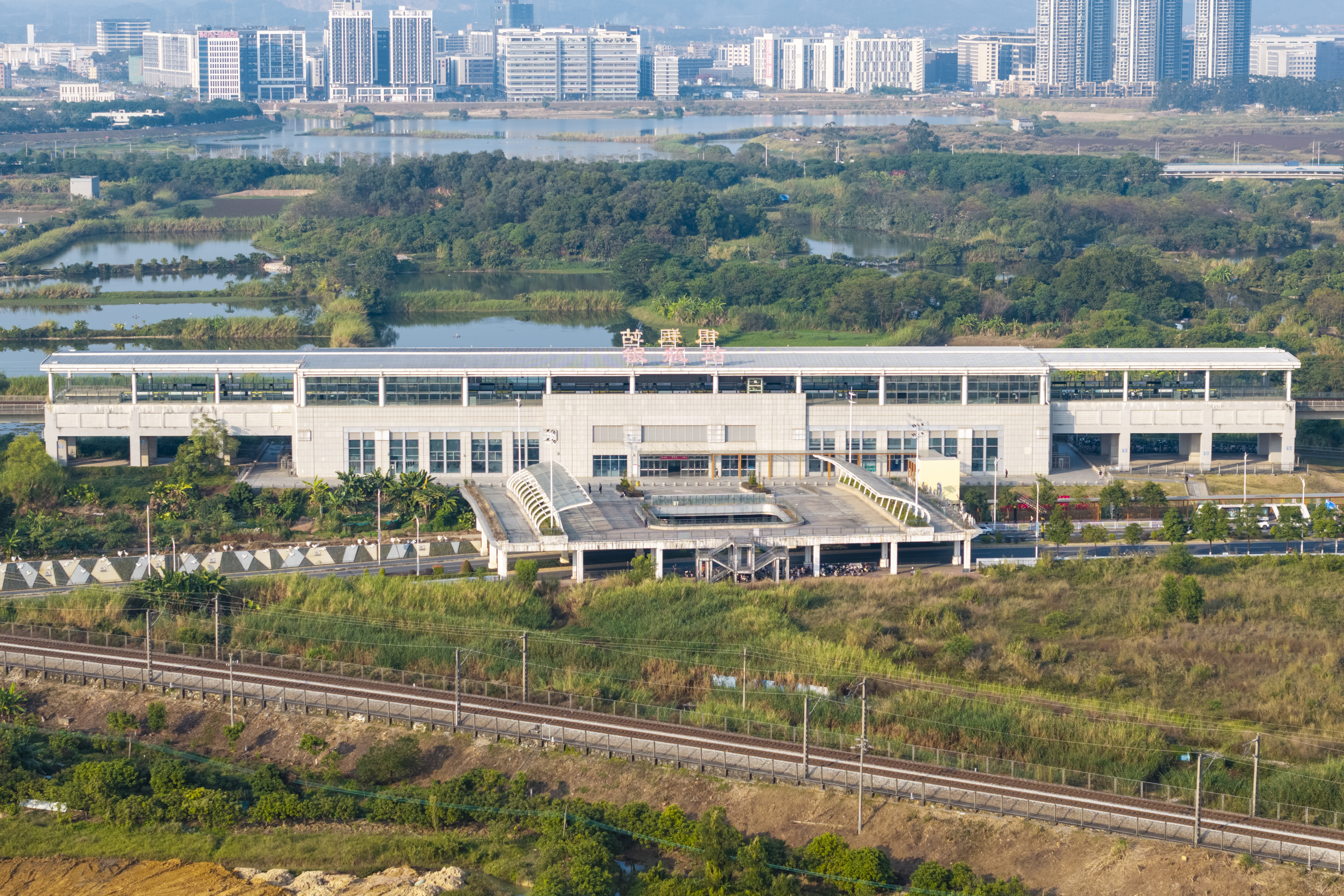
- Exterior

Chinese name
- Simplified Chinese: 银瓶站
- Traditional Chinese: 銀瓶站
Transcriptions
Standard Mandarin
- Hanyu Pinyin: Yínpíng Zhàn
Yue: Cantonese
- Jyutping: Ngan^{4}ping^{4} Zaam^{6}

General information
- Location: Garden Boulevard (花园大道), Xiegang, Dongguan, Guangdong; China
- Coordinates: 22°58′09″N 114°09′05″E
- Owner: Pearl River Delta Metropolitan Region intercity railway
- Operator: Guangdong Intercity Railway Operation Co., Ltd.
- Line: Guangzhou–Huizhou intercity railway
- Platforms: 2 (2 side platforms)
- Tracks: 2

Construction
- Structure type: Elevated
- Accessible: Yes

Other information
- Station code: KPQ (Pinyin: YPI)

History
- Opened: 30 March 2016; 10 years ago

Services
Preceding station	Pearl River Delta Metropolitan Region Intercity Railway	Following station
Zhangmutou East towards Panyu	Guangzhou–Huizhou intercity railway	Lilin North towards Huizhou North
Location

Yinping railway station (simplified Chinese: 银瓶站; traditional Chinese: 銀瓶站; pinyin: Yínpíng Zhàn; Jyutping: Ngan^{4}ping^{4} Zaam^{6}) is a railway station in Xiegang, Dongguan, Guangdong, China. It opened on 30 March 2016.

== History ==
The station is named Xiegang during the planning and construction stage and is located on the southwest side of the former Xiegang railway station on the Beijing–Kowloon railway in the early planning stage. In 2010, after the Ministry of Railways intervened in the construction of the Pearl River Delta Metropolitan Region intercity railway, the line scheme was redesigned. Eventually, at the suggestion of Dongguan City and Zhangmutou Town, in order to avoid cutting the urban planning and make the line position straighter, the line position of the section from Changping to Xiegang was greatly shifted to the north, and the station was adjusted northwest to the current site.

In order to avoid the same name as the national railway station, the station was named Yinping at the end of 2015.
