= Songshanhu North railway station =

Railway station in Dongguan, Guangdong, China

Songshanhubei 松山湖北
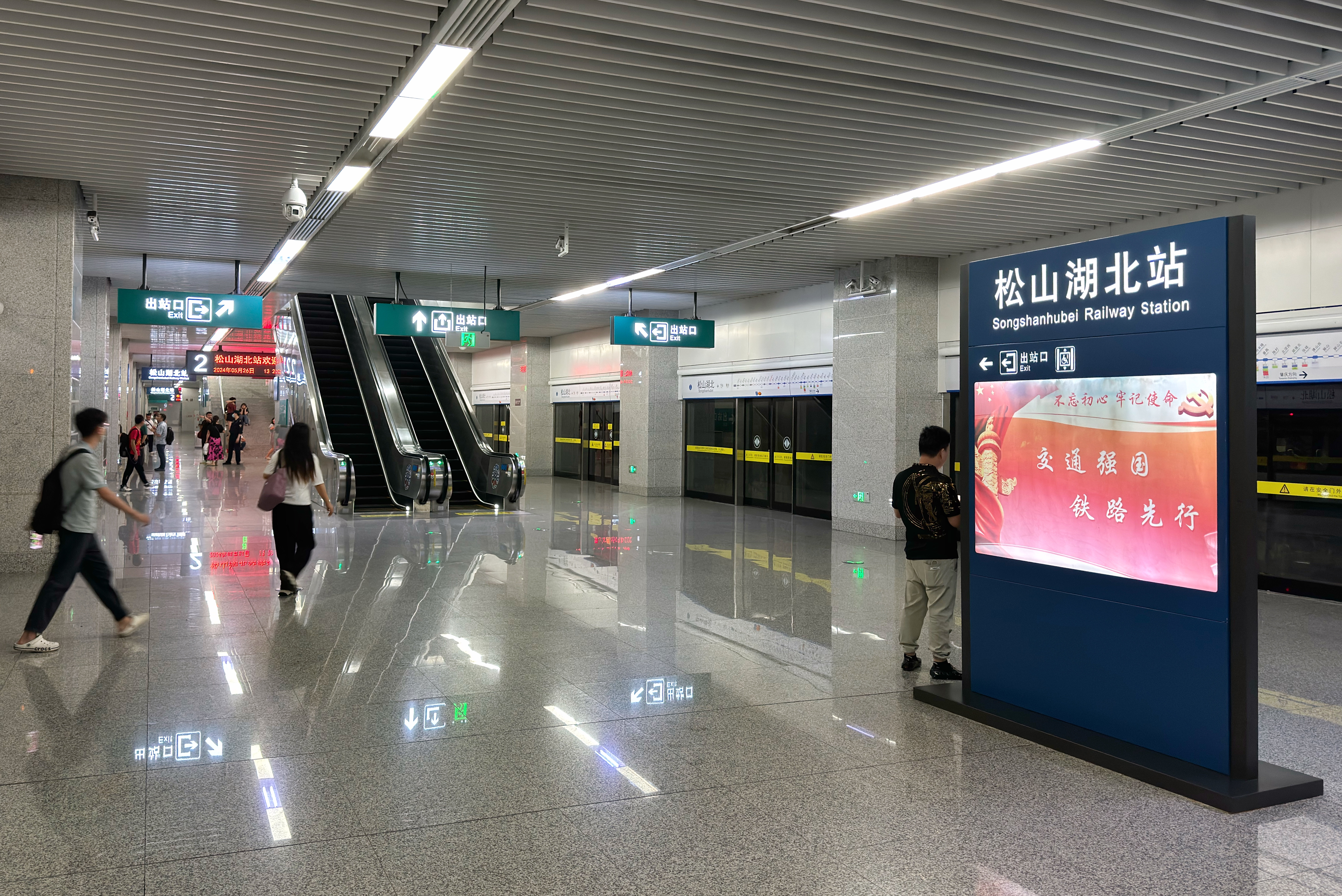
- Platform

Chinese name
- Chinese: 松山湖北站
Transcriptions
Standard Mandarin
- Hanyu Pinyin: Sōngshānhú Běi Zhàn
Yue: Cantonese
- Jyutping: Cung^{4}saan^{1}wu^{4} Bak^{1} Zaam^{6}

General information
- Location: Yingbin Road (迎宾路), Liaobu, Dongguan, Guangdong; China
- Coordinates: 22°59′27″N 113°51′03″E
- Owner: Pearl River Delta Metropolitan Region intercity railway
- Operator: Guangdong Intercity Railway Operation Co., Ltd.
- Line: Guangzhou–Huizhou intercity railway
- Platforms: 2 (1 island platform)
- Tracks: 2

Construction
- Structure type: Underground
- Accessible: Yes

Other information
- Station code: KUQ (Pinyin: SSB)

History
- Opened: 28 December 2017; 8 years ago

Services
Preceding station	Pearl River Delta Metropolitan Region Intercity Railway	Following station
Liaobu towards Panyu	Guangzhou–Huizhou intercity railway	Dalang Town towards Huizhou North
Location

Songshanhu North railway station (Chinese: 松山湖北站; pinyin: Sōngshānhú Běi Zhàn; Jyutping: Cung^{4}saan^{1}wu^{4} Bak^{1} Zaam^{6}) is a railway station in Liaobu, Dongguan, Guangdong, China. It opened on 28 December 2017.

The station has 4 exits, lettered A-D. Exit A opened when the station opened, and Exit D was opened on 25 January 2019. Exit C has been built but not opened, and Exit B has not been built yet.

== History ==
In the early stage of Dongguan-Huizhou intercity planning, this station was not included. In 2010, after the Ministry of Railways intervened in the construction of the Pearl River Delta Metropolitan Region intercity railway, the line scheme was redesigned. Finally, at the suggestion of Dongguan City and the towns and streets along the line, in order to avoid cutting the urban planning, the urban area of Dongguan and the Liaobu and Changping sections were changed from elevated to underground, and Songshanhubei (North) was added on the north side of Songshan Lake.

== Incident ==
In March 2010, a man claiming to be an intercity construction worker called the Dongguan Times, breaking the news that the construction company had cut corners at the station and used only half of the steel bars for the three pile foundations. The person in charge of the construction party, CCCC No. 1 Company, responded that this person had extorted 150,000 yuan unsuccessfully, so he maliciously reported it to the media. The Guangdong Provincial Quality Supervision Department and the relevant responsible departments of Guangdong Railway Investment were subsequently stationed at the site for investigation, but there was no follow-up report on the incident.
