= FQQ =

FQQ may refer to:

- FQQ, division code for Fengquan, Xinxiang, Henan, China
- FQQ, station code for Changping East railway station in Dongguan, Guangdong, China
