= Gaobu =

Gaobu may refer to the following locations in China:

- Gaobu, Guangdong (高埗镇), town in Dongguan
- Gaobu, Jiangxi (高埠镇), town in Zixi County
- Gaobu, Zhejiang (皋埠镇), town in Yuecheng District, Shaoxing
