= Daojiao =

Daojiao may refer to:

- Taoism, especially when considered as a religion
  - The Taoist side of Chinese alchemy
  - Daojiao Zhizu ("Taoist Ancestor"), a name of the high taoist divinity Daode Tianzun
- Daojiao, Guangdong, a Chinese town
- Zhongsha Daojiao Town, a disputed administrative area of the Zhongsha Islands

== See also ==
- Dajiao, an annual Taoist ritual/festival
