= LTQ =

LTQ or LtQ may refer to:

- LTQ, the IATA code for Le Touquet–Elizabeth II Airport, France
- LTQ, the station code for Liaobu railway station, Guangdong, China
- Living the Questions, a DVD and web-based curriculum designed to help people evaluate the relevance of Christianity in the 21st century
