= ZRQ =

ZRQ may refer to:

- ZRQ Bormla Futsal, a defunct Maltese futsal club
- Postal code for Żurrieq, Malta
- Station code for Zhangmutou East railway station, Dongguan, Guangdong, China
