= Gaobu, Guangdong =

Gaobu 高埗镇
- Town
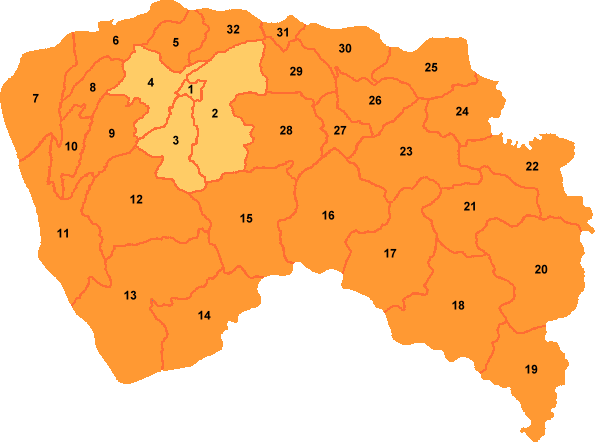
- Gaobu is labeled '5' on this map of Dongguan

- Location within Guangdong
- Coordinates: 23°05′29″N 113°44′45″E
- Country: People's Republic of China
- Province: Guangdong
- Prefecture-level city: Dongguan

Area
  - Total: 30 km^{2} (12 sq mi)

Population (2010)
  - Total: 217,436
  - Density: 7,200/km^{2} (19,000/sq mi)
- Time zone: UTC+8 (China Standard)
- Postal code: 523000
- Area code: 769
- License plate prefixes: 粤S
- Website: http://www.gaobu.gov.cn/

Gaobu, Guangdong
- Chinese: 高埗
- Literal meaning: High 'Po'
Transcriptions
Standard Mandarin
- Hanyu Pinyin: Gāo bù
Yue: Cantonese
- Jyutping: Gou^{1} bou^{6}

Gaobu is a town located within the Shuixiang Area, which is the fifth largest of six 'areas' under the jurisdiction of Dongguan prefecture-level city in the Pearl River Delta region of Guangdong province, China.

== Geography ==
Gao Bu Town is located south of the Tropic of Cancer, latitude 23 ° 05'-23 ° 08 ', longitude 113 ° 45', and enjoys a subtropical climate, mild climate, evergreen flora and an annual average temperature of around 21.9 °C.

The town is approximately 7.5 km in width from North to South and 4.5 km wide, with a total area of 34 square kilometers. Gaobu runs along the Dongjiang River tributary and has an elevation of between 1m and 4m. It is often subject to floods and water-logging.

== Demographics ==
In 2009, the official residential population was 162,000, distributed into 37,600 households. Under the jurisdiction of a community, Gaobu has 18 village committees.

== Transport ==
Gaobu is located North of the 'city' area of Dongguan. The town forms part of the "four vertical and four horizontal" modern transportation network, connecting the Dongguan-Shenzhen Expressway, Guangzhou-Huizhou Expressway, High-speed and Wando East Guangyuan Road.

The result is a connection with Guangzhou, Shenzhen, Huizhou and surrounding Towns, creating a "one hour economic circle." Dongguan city can be reached in around 20 minutes drive from Gaobu. To get to the Guangzhou Baiyun Airport is about 60 minutes drive, and to Shenzhen's Airport is about 40 minutes drive. To reach Humen Port will need around 30 minutes' drive. The Kowloon-Canton railway (KCR) Station in Shilong is 20 minutes away and the Dongguan East railway station is about 40 minutes by car.

== Administration ==
All towns and zones in the Shuixiang Area are as follows:

Map (Gaobu is #5)
#	Name	Hanzi	Hanyu Pinyin	Population (2010 Census)	Area (km²)	Density (/km²)
Shuixiang Area				1,109,686	315.0	3,522.81
4	Wanjiang District	万江区	Wànjiāng Qū	244,765	50.5	4,846.83
5	Gaobu Town	高埗镇	Gāobù Zhèn	217,436	30.0	7,247.86
6	Zhongtang Town	中堂镇	Zhōngtáng Zhèn	139,563	60.0	2,326.05
7	Machong Town	麻涌镇	Máchǒng Zhèn	118,062	74.0	1,595.43
8	Wangniudun Town	望牛墩镇	Wàngniúdūn Zhèn	84,786	31.5	2,685.65
10	Hongmei Town	洪梅镇	Hóngméi Zhèn	58,114	33.0	1,761.03
32	Shijie Town	石碣镇	Shíjié Zhèn	246,960	36.0	6,860.00

== Economy ==
Guided by the township motto of "united, energized, pragmatic, dedicated, and daring," the Gaobu community has fostered an international, export-driven economy. The town accommodates businesses from various regions such as Taiwan, Hong Kong, Japan, Germany, Canada, Italy, Belgium, France, and South Korea, totaling approximately 200 foreign-invested enterprises. These enterprises have collectively invested over $320 million in the area.

Industries in Gaobu include electronics, plastics, toys, hardware, shoes, bags and other fashion accessories.

Gaobu is home to a number of international companies, including Yue Yuen Group, Lee & Man Holding Company, telecommunications companies, high-tech electronics factories, Bai Hong electronics factory, Jianhong glasses factory, Cosmosupplylab, (one of the top 200 suppliers to Apple Inc.) and eyewear manufacturer and retailer Luxottica.
