= Dalang =

Dalang may refer to:

- Dalang (puppeteer), a puppet master in Indonesia
- Dalang, Sudan, a town in South Kordofan State in Sudan

== Places in China ==
- Dalang, Dongguan, a town in Dongguan, Guangdong
- Dalang Subdistrict (大浪街道), a subdistrict in Longhua District, Shenzhen, Guangdong
- Dalang Township (达浪乡), a township in Hezheng County, Gansu
