= Changping East railway station =

Railway station in Dongguan, Guangdong, China

Changpingdong 常平东
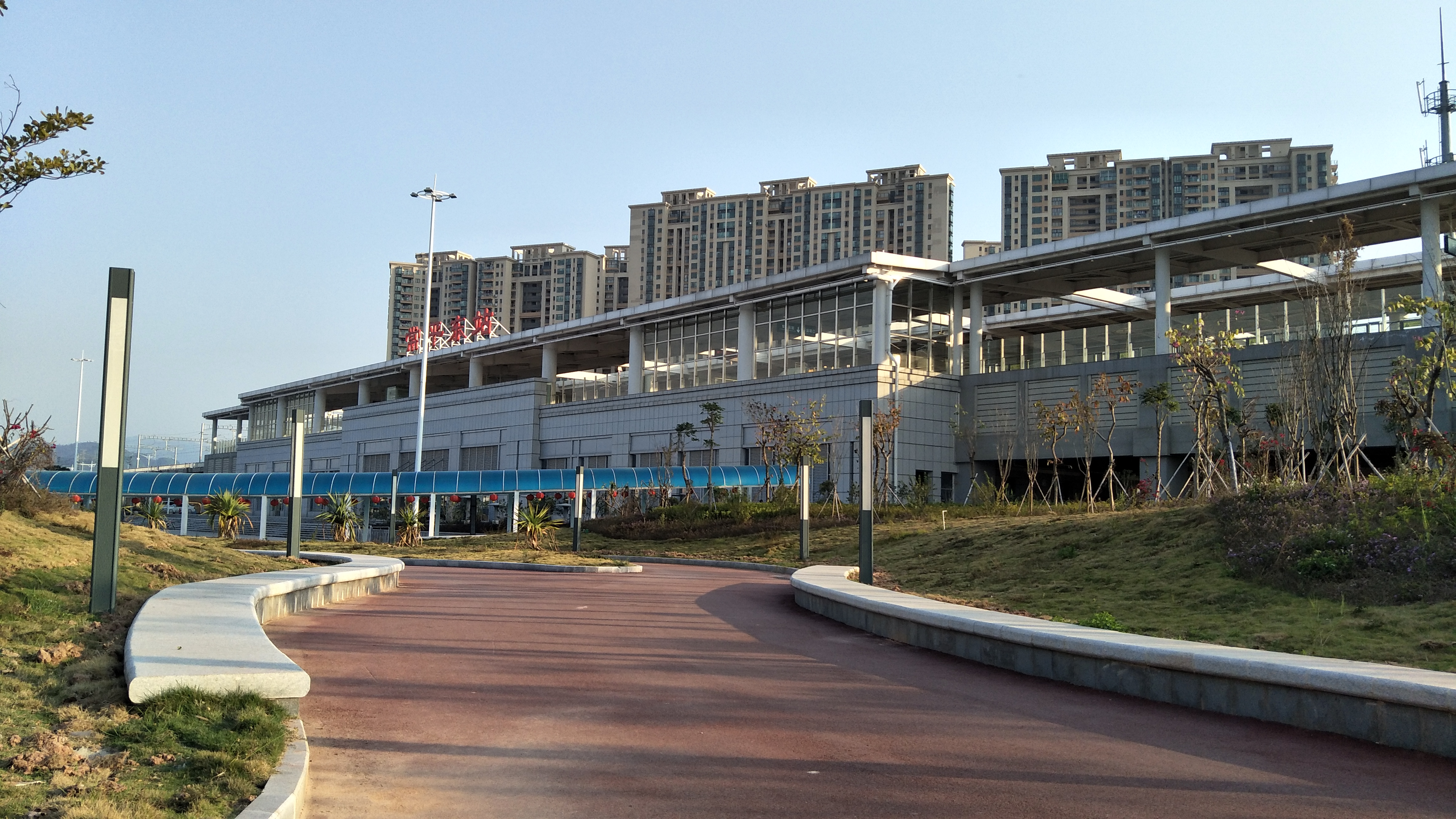
- Exterior

Chinese name
- Simplified Chinese: 常平东站
- Traditional Chinese: 常平東站
Transcriptions
Standard Mandarin
- Hanyu Pinyin: Chángpíng Dōng Zhàn
Yue: Cantonese
- Jyutping: Soeng^{4}ping^{4} Dung^{1} Zaam^{6}

General information
- Location: Boundary of Changdong Road (常东路) and Dongzhan Road (东站路), Changping, Dongguan, Guangdong; China
- Coordinates: 22°57′54″N 114°02′07″E
- Owner: Pearl River Delta Metropolitan Region intercity railway
- Operator: Guangdong Intercity Railway Operation Co., Ltd.
- Line: Guangzhou–Huizhou intercity railway
- Platforms: 2 (2 side platforms)
- Tracks: 4
- Connections: Dongguan East

Construction
- Structure type: Elevated
- Accessible: Yes

Other information
- Station code: FQQ (Pinyin: CPD)

History
- Opened: 30 March 2016; 10 years ago

Services
Preceding station	Pearl River Delta Metropolitan Region Intercity Railway	Following station
Changping South towards Panyu	Guangzhou–Huizhou intercity railway	Zhangmutou East towards Huizhou North
Location

Changping East railway station (simplified Chinese: 常平东站; traditional Chinese: 常平東站; pinyin: Chángpíng Dōng Zhàn; Jyutping: Soeng^{4}ping^{4} Dung^{1} Zaam^{6}) is a railway station in Changping, Dongguan, Guangdong, China. It opened on 30 March 2016, and was the western terminus of the Guangzhou–Huizhou intercity railway before the extension to Daojiao opened on 28 December 2017.

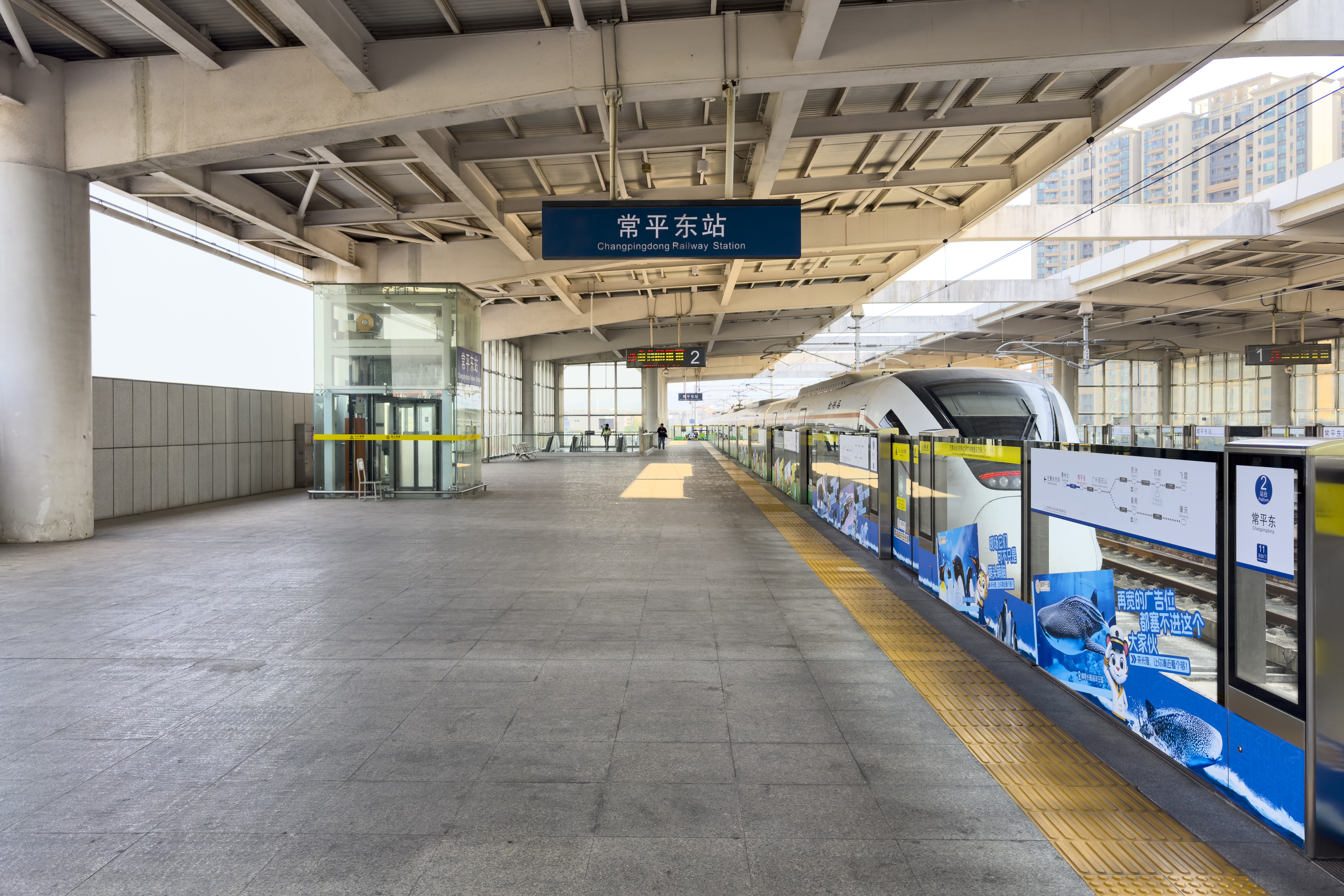
Platform (towards Huizhou)

== History ==
In the early stage of the Dongguan-Huizhou intercity planning, there was a Huangjiang station in Huangjiang Town between Changping Station and Zhangmutou Station (now Changping South and Zhangmutou East). In 2010, after the Ministry of Railways intervened in the construction of the Pearl River Delta Metropolitan Region intercity railway, the line scheme was redesigned. Finally, at the suggestion of Dongguan City and the towns and streets along the line, in order to avoid cutting the urban planning and make the line position straighter, the Changping-Xiegang section was shifted north, no longer passing through Huangjiang, and at the same time, Dongguan East Station was added near the Dongguan East Station of the National Railway.

In order to avoid the same name as the national railway station, the station was named Changping East at the end of 2015. On 30 March 2016, this station was opened with the opening of the eastern section from Xiaojinkou to here on the Dongguan-Huizhou intercity (now Guangzhou–Huizhou intercity).

== Transfer ==
On the northwest side of the station, there is Dongguan East railway station of the Beijing-Kowloon railway, but the two stations are about 900 meters apart, and there is no underground transfer passageway during construction, so passengers need to walk about 10 minutes out of the station before transferring.
