= Dongcheng South railway station =

Railway station in Dongguan, Guangdong, China

Dongchengnan 东城南
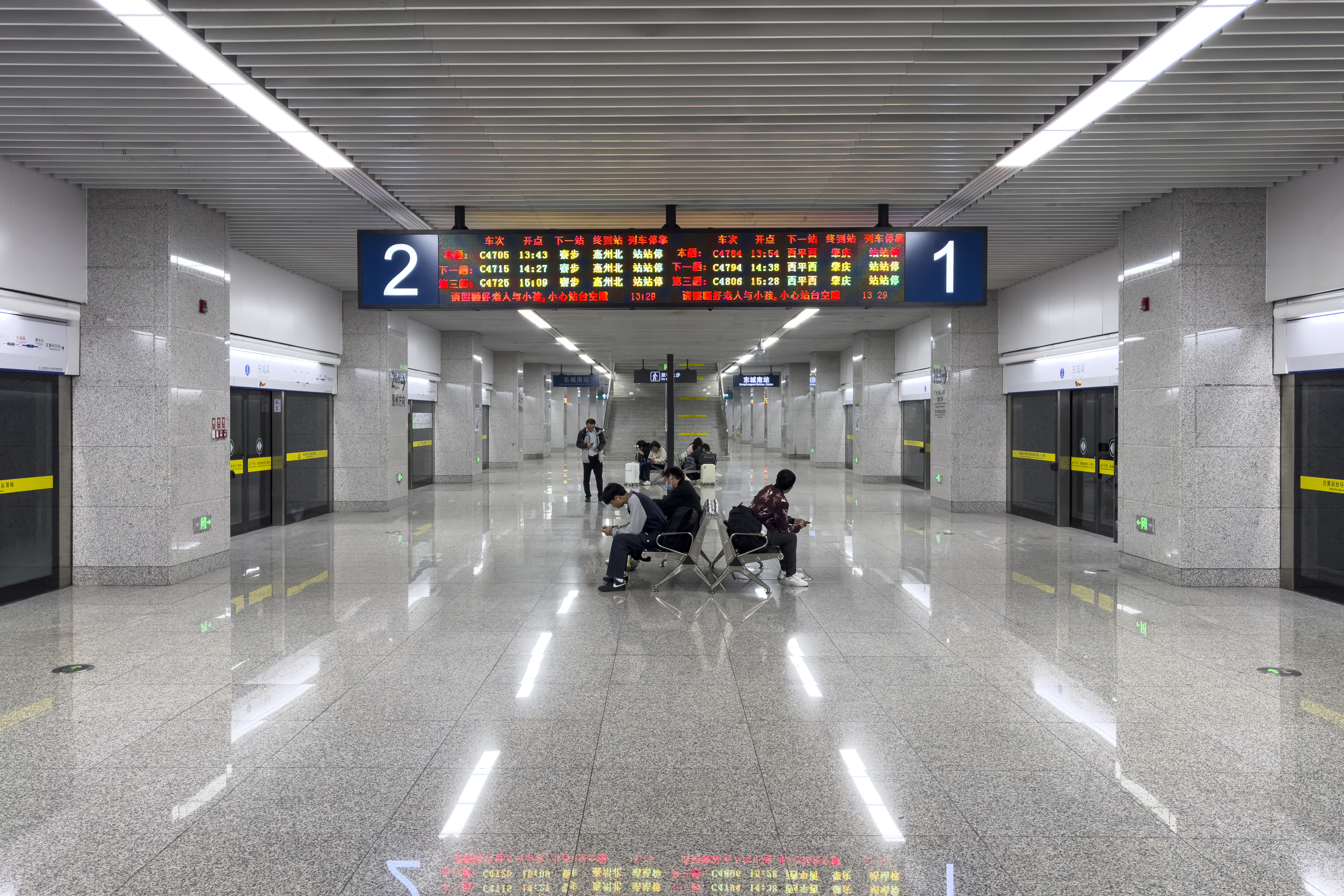
- Platform

Chinese name
- Simplified Chinese: 东城南站
- Traditional Chinese: 東城南站
Transcriptions
Standard Mandarin
- Hanyu Pinyin: Dōngchéng Nán Zhàn
Yue: Cantonese
- Jyutping: Dung^{1}sing^{4} Naam^{4} Zaam^{6}

General information
- Location: Intersection of Guanchang Road (莞长路) and Changtai Road (长泰路), Dongcheng Subdistrict, Dongguan, Guangdong; China
- Coordinates: 22°59′25″N 113°46′16″E
- Owner: Pearl River Delta Metropolitan Region intercity railway
- Operator: Guangdong Intercity Railway Operation Co., Ltd.
- Line: Guangzhou–Huizhou intercity railway
- Platforms: 2 (1 island platform)
- Tracks: 2
- Connections: 1

Construction
- Structure type: Underground
- Accessible: Yes

Other information
- Station code: IYQ (Pinyin: DCN); Metro: 111

History
- Opened: 28 December 2017; 8 years ago

Services
| Preceding station | Pearl River Delta Metropolitan Region Intercity Railway | Following station |
|---|---|---|
| Xiping West towards Panyu | Guangzhou–Huizhou intercity railway | Liaobu towards Huizhou North |
| Preceding station | Dongguan Rail Transit | Following station |
| Lixin towards Dongguanxi Railway Station | Line 1 | Tongsha Park towards Meitang |
Location

Dongcheng South railway station (simplified Chinese: 东城南站; traditional Chinese: 東城南站; pinyin: Dōngchéng Nán Zhàn; Jyutping: Dung^{1}sing^{4} Naam^{4} Zaam^{6}) is a railway station in Dongcheng Subdistrict, Dongguan, Guangdong, China. It opened on 28 December 2017.

== History ==
In the early stage of the intercity planning of Dongguan and Huizhou, there was an elevated station on the north side of Xiping Reservoir on Huancheng South Road called Guanchang Coach Terminal. In 2010, after the Ministry of Railways intervened in the construction of the Pearl River Delta Metropolitan Region intercity railway, the line scheme was redesigned. Finally, at the suggestion of Dongguan City and the towns and streets along the line, in order to avoid cutting the urban planning and avoid ecologically sensitive points such as Shuilian Mountain Forest Park and Tongsha Forest Park, the Dongguan urban area, Liaobu and Changping sections were changed from elevated to underground, so the station was adjusted to the underground Dongcheng South Station, and shifted northeast to the current site.

== Metro services ==
The station is served by Dongguan Rail Transit Line 1 which opened on 28 November 2025. There is a transfer passageway in the concourse that connects to the railway station.
