= Liaobu railway station =

Railway station in Dongguan, Guangdong, China

Liaobu 寮步
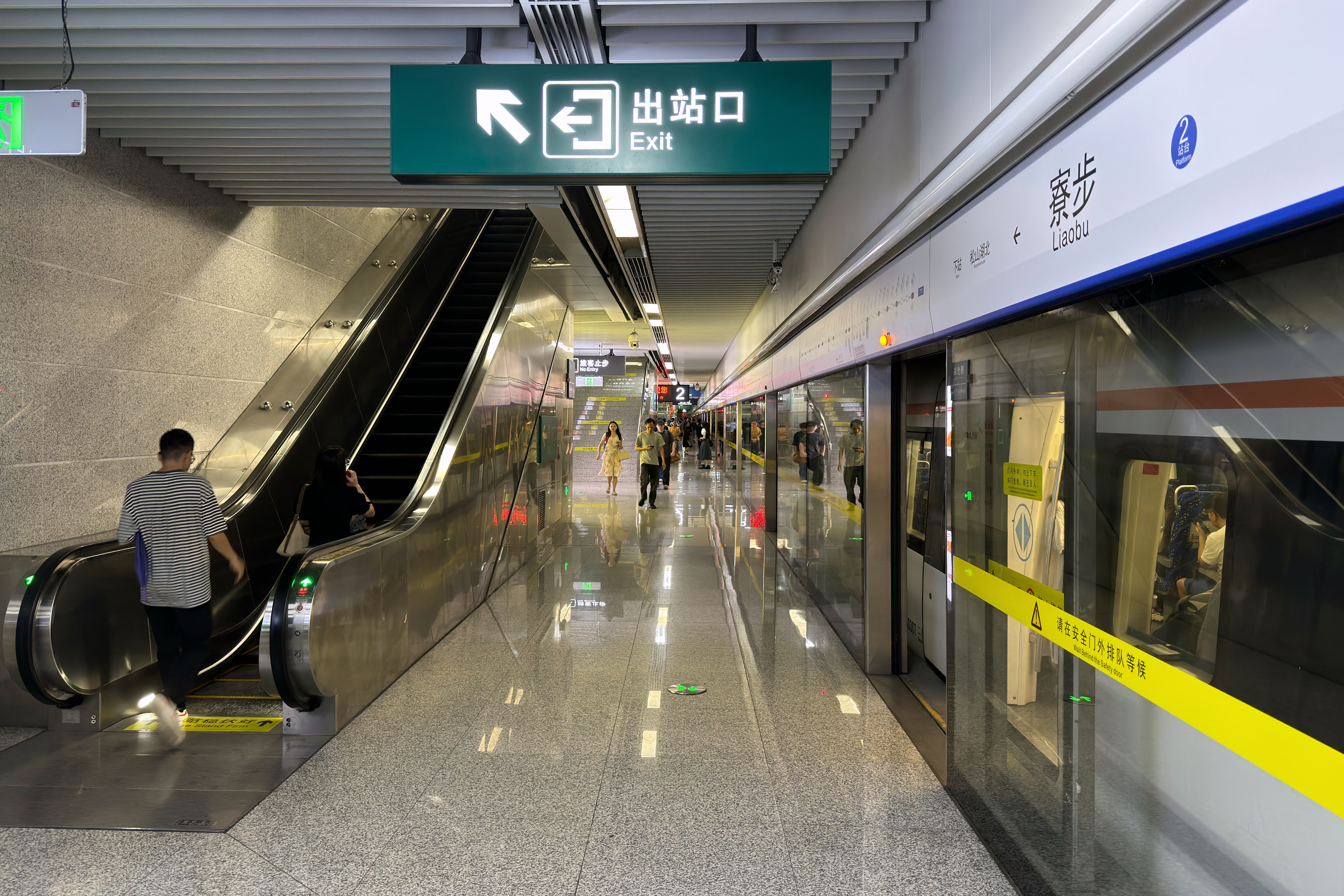
- Platform

Chinese name
- Chinese: 寮步站
Transcriptions
Standard Mandarin
- Hanyu Pinyin: Liáobù Zhàn
Yue: Cantonese
- Jyutping: Liu^{4}bou^{6} Zaam^{6}

General information
- Location: Intersection of Longsheng Road (龙胜路) and Zhanqian Road (站前路), Liaobu, Dongguan, Guangdong; China
- Coordinates: 22°59′27″N 113°51′03″E
- Owner: Pearl River Delta Metropolitan Region intercity railway
- Operator: Guangdong Intercity Railway Operation Co., Ltd.
- Line: Guangzhou–Huizhou intercity railway
- Platforms: 2 (2 side platforms)
- Tracks: 4

Construction
- Structure type: Underground
- Accessible: Yes

Other information
- Station code: LTQ (Pinyin: LBU)

History
- Opened: 28 December 2017; 8 years ago

Services
Preceding station	Pearl River Delta Metropolitan Region Intercity Railway	Following station
Dongcheng South towards Panyu	Guangzhou–Huizhou intercity railway	Songshanhu North towards Huizhou North
Location

Liaobu railway station (Chinese: 寮步站; pinyin: Liáobù Zhàn; Jyutping: Liu^{4}bou^{6} Zaam^{6}) is a railway station in Liaobu, Dongguan, Guangdong, China. It opened on 28 December 2017.

The station has 4 exits, lettered A-D, but only Exit C is currently open.

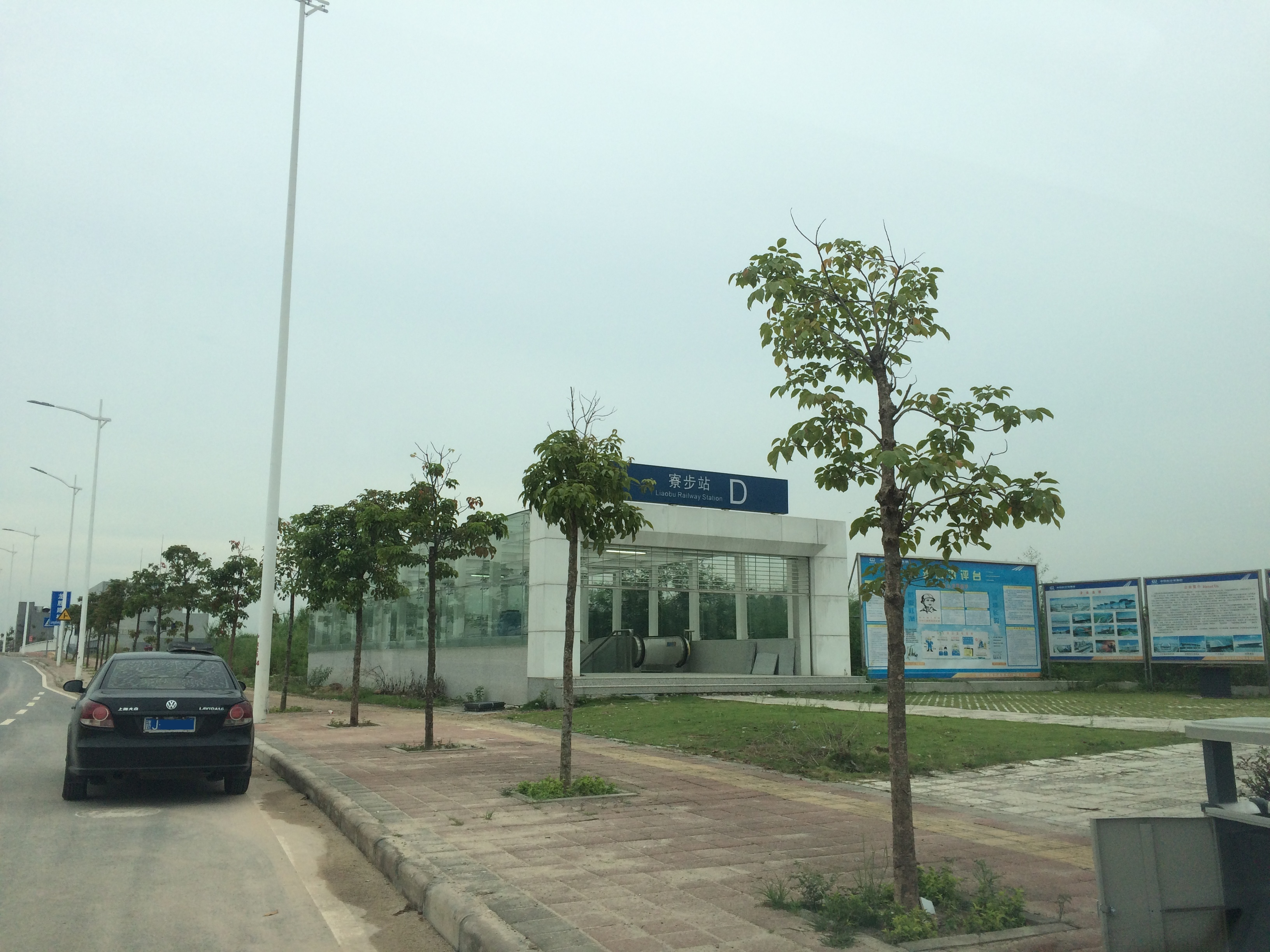
Exit D (Unopened)

== History ==
The station was an elevated station during the planning and construction stage. In 2010, after the Ministry of Railways intervened in the construction of the Pearl River Delta Metropolitan Region intercity railway, the line scheme was redesigned. Finally, at the suggestion of Dongguan City and the towns and streets along the line, in order to avoid cutting the urban planning, the urban area of Dongguan and the Liaobu and Changping sections were changed from elevated to underground, so the station was adjusted to an underground station, and the station was shifted northwest by about 1.4km to the current site.
