= Lilin North railway station =

Railway station in Huizhou, Guangdong, China

Lilinbei 沥林北
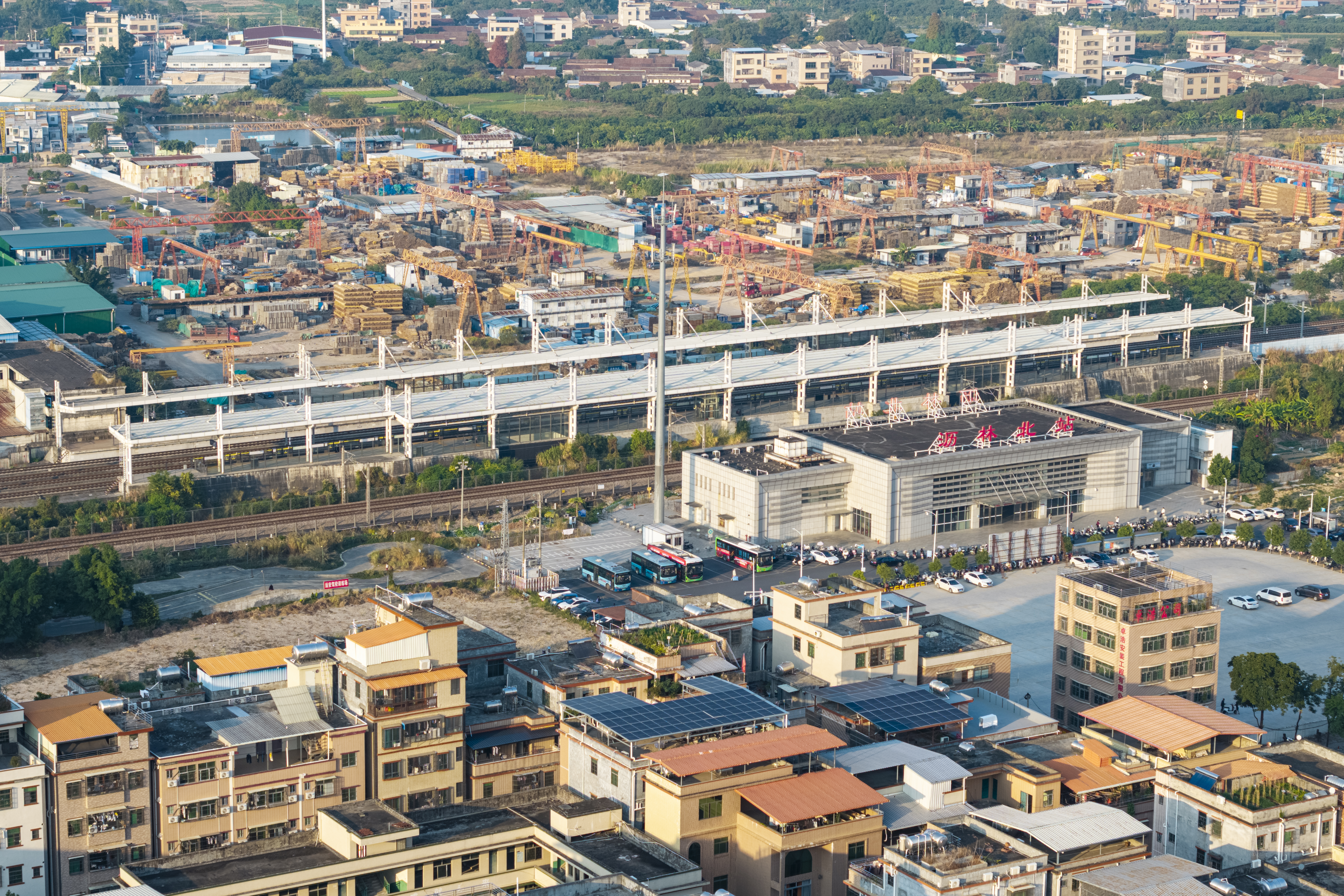
- Exterior

Chinese name
- Simplified Chinese: 沥林北站
- Traditional Chinese: 瀝林北站
Transcriptions
Standard Mandarin
- Hanyu Pinyin: Lìlín Běi Zhàn
Yue: Cantonese
- Jyutping: Lik^{1}lam^{4} Bak^{1} Zaam^{6}

General information
- Location: West Guangchang Road (广场西路), Lilin, Huicheng District, Huizhou, Guangdong; China
- Coordinates: 22°58′45″N 114°13′22″E
- Owner: Pearl River Delta Metropolitan Region intercity railway
- Operator: Guangdong Intercity Railway Operation Co., Ltd.
- Line: Guangzhou–Huizhou intercity railway
- Platforms: 2 (2 side platforms)
- Tracks: 4

Construction
- Structure type: At-grade
- Accessible: Yes

Other information
- Station code: KBQ (Pinyin: LLB)

History
- Opened: 30 March 2016; 10 years ago

Services
Preceding station	Pearl River Delta Metropolitan Region Intercity Railway	Following station
Yinping towards Panyu	Guangzhou–Huizhou intercity railway	Chenjiang South towards Huizhou North
Location

Lilin North railway station (simplified Chinese: 沥林北站; traditional Chinese: 瀝林北站; pinyin: Lìlín Běi Zhàn) is a railway station in Huicheng District, Huizhou, Guangdong, China. It opened on 30 March 2016.

There is a comprehensive maintenance yard on the northeast side of the station. Because of that, in order to facilitate the entry and exit of trains and large equipment, the station has a one-way connecting line to the former Xiegang Station on the Beijing–Kowloon railway.

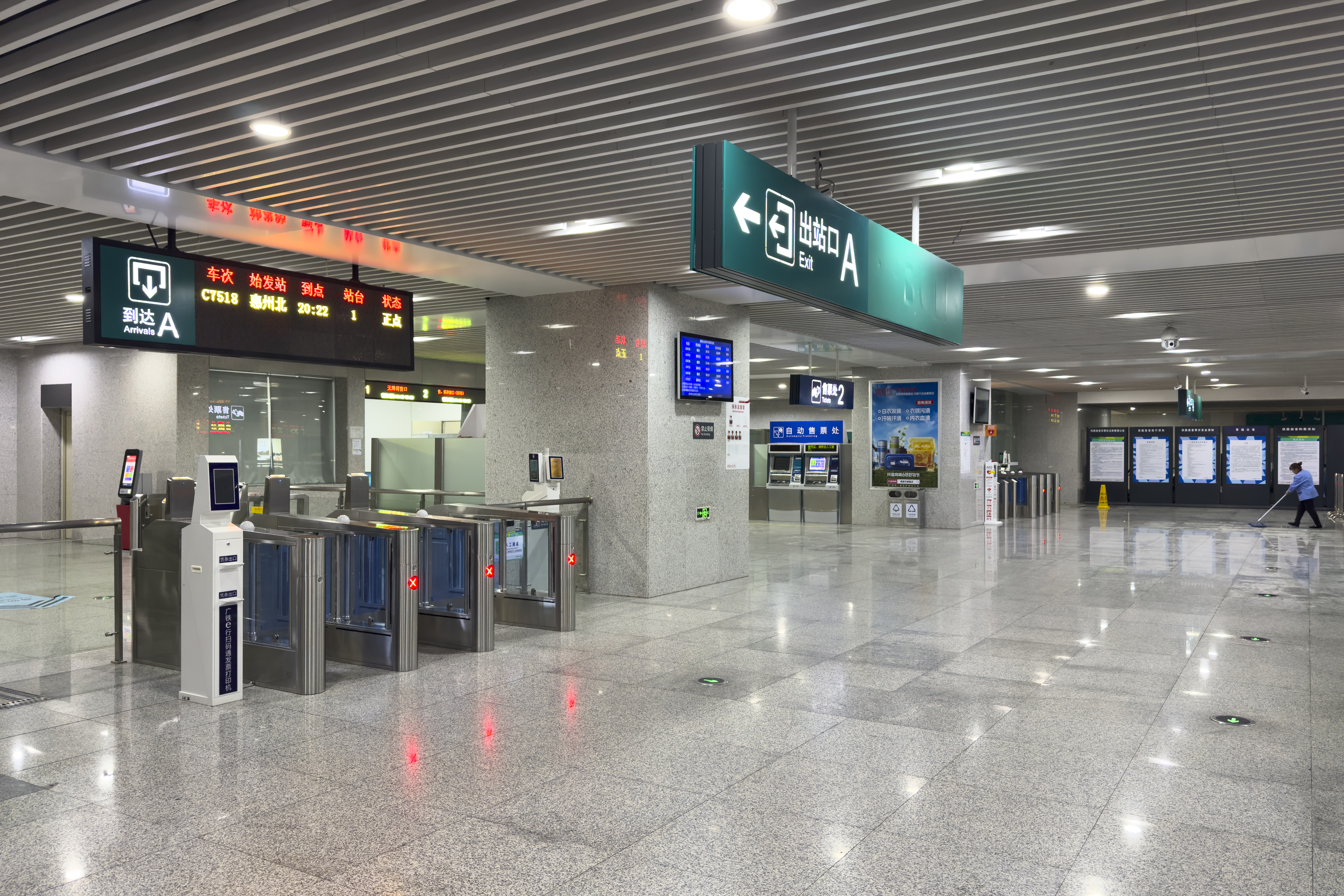
Concourse

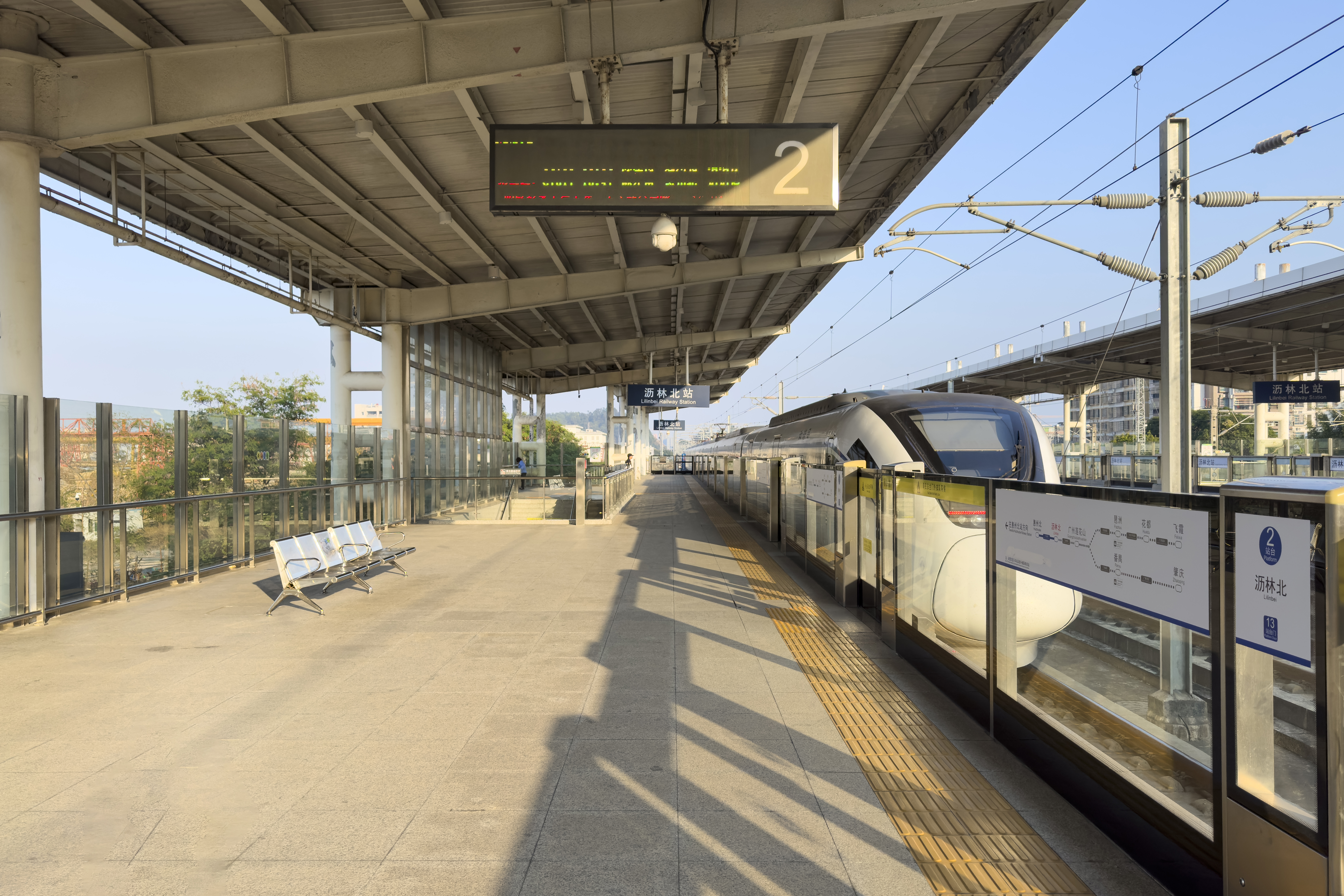
Platform 2

== History ==
The station is named Lilin during the planning and construction stage and was changed to Lilin North at the end of 2015.

== Future development ==
The Shenzhen–Huizhou intercity railway will set up a station at this station and plans to run on the same line as the Guanghui Intercity.
