= Zhangmutou East railway station =

Railway station in Dongguan, Guangdong, China

Zhangmutoudong 樟木头东
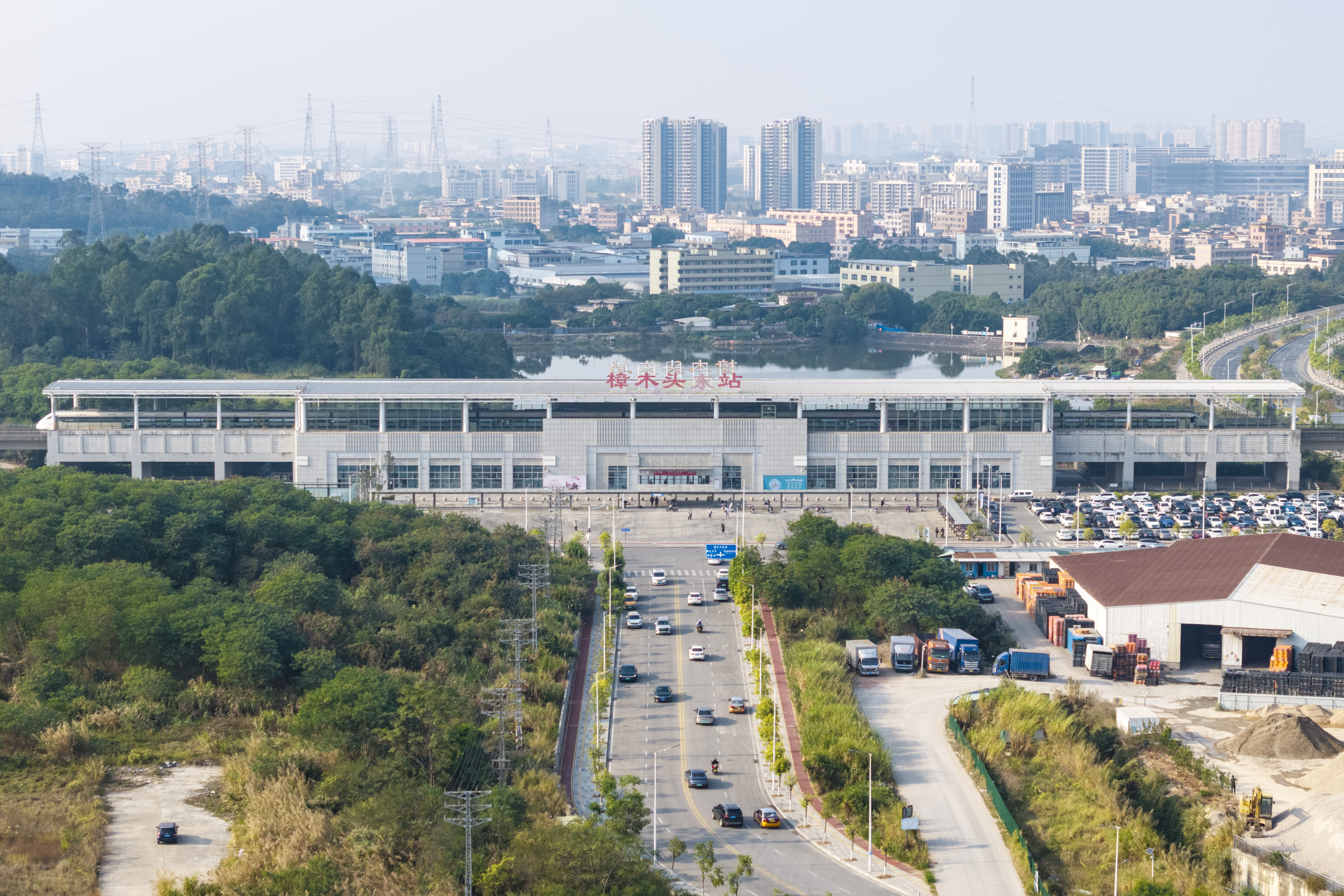
- Exterior

Chinese name
- Simplified Chinese: 樟木头东站
- Traditional Chinese: 樟木頭東站
Transcriptions
Standard Mandarin
- Hanyu Pinyin: Zhāngmùtóu Dōng Zhàn
Yue: Cantonese
- Jyutping: Zoeng^{1}muk^{6}tau^{4} Dung^{1} Zaam^{6}

General information
- Location: Nipo Village (坭坡村), Yufeng Community (裕丰社区), Zhangmutou, Dongguan, Guangdong; China
- Coordinates: 22°57′39″N 114°06′00″E
- Owner: Pearl River Delta Metropolitan Region intercity railway
- Operator: Guangdong Intercity Railway Operation Co., Ltd.
- Line: Guangzhou–Huizhou intercity railway
- Platforms: 2 (2 side platforms)
- Tracks: 2

Construction
- Structure type: Elevated
- Accessible: Yes

Other information
- Station code: ZRQ (Pinyin: ZMD)

History
- Opened: 30 March 2016; 10 years ago

Services
Preceding station	Pearl River Delta Metropolitan Region Intercity Railway	Following station
Changping East towards Panyu	Guangzhou–Huizhou intercity railway	Yinping towards Huizhou North
Location

Zhangmutou East railway station (simplified Chinese: 樟木头东站; traditional Chinese: 樟木頭東站; pinyin: Zhāngmùtóu Dōng Zhàn; Jyutping: Zoeng^{1}muk^{6}tau^{4} Dung^{1} Zaam^{6}) is a railway station in Zhangmutou, Dongguan, Guangdong, China. It opened on 30 March 2016.

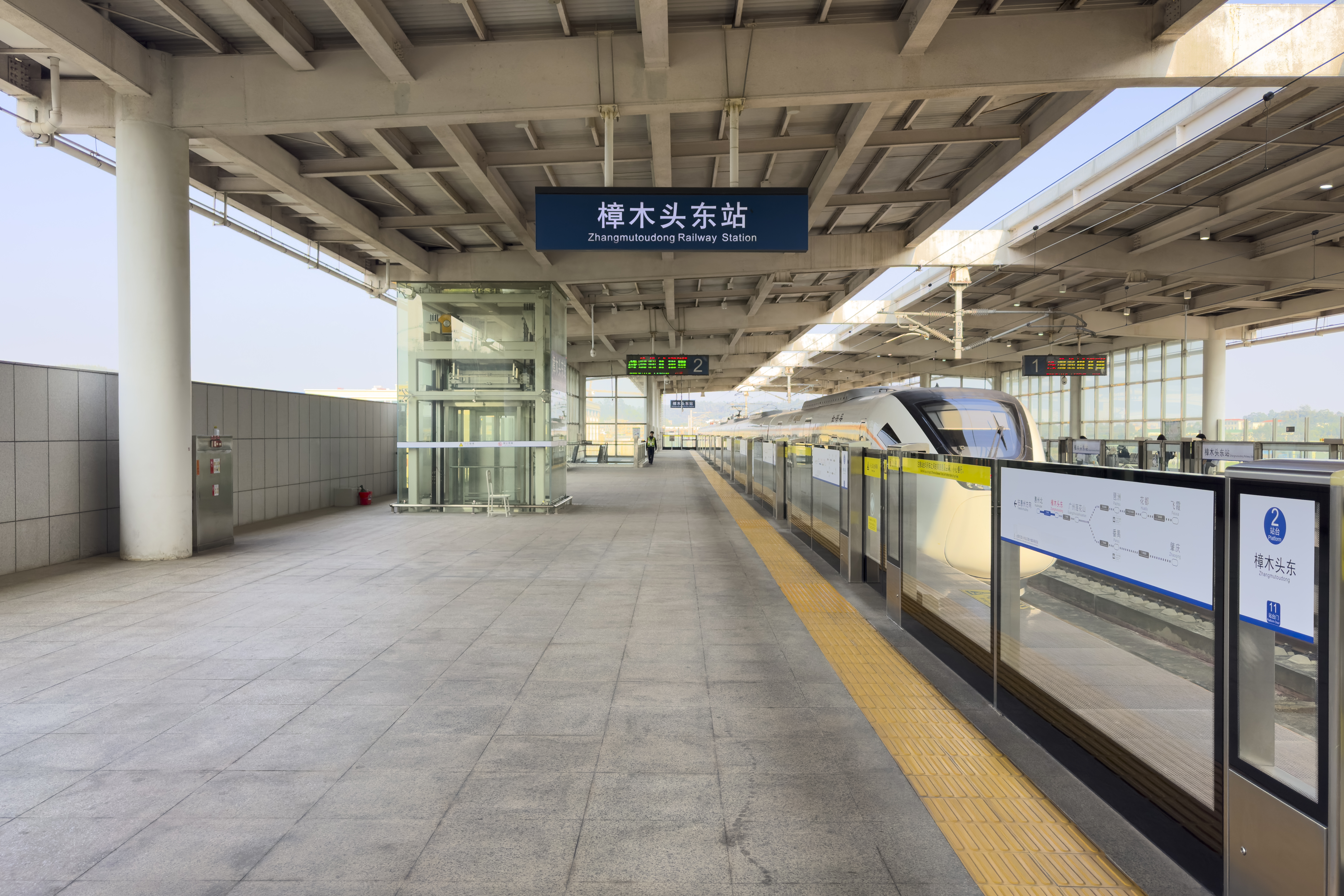
Platform (towards Huizhou)

== History ==
The station is named Zhangmutou during the planning and construction stage, and is located on the northwest side of Mount Guanyin Forest Park in the early planning stage. At the suggestion of Dongguan City and Zhangmutou Town, in order to avoid cutting the urban planning and make the line position straighter, the line position of the section from Changping to Xiegang was greatly shifted to the north, and the station was cancelled for a time. In 2010, after the Ministry of Railways intervened in the construction of the Pearl River Delta Metropolitan Region intercity railway, the line scheme was redesigned, and Zhangmutou station was re-added in the northeast direction.

On 10 July 2011, the station began construction. In order to avoid the same name as the national railway station, the station was named Zhangmutou East at the end of 2015.
