= Dalang Town railway station =

Railway station in Dongguan, Guangdong, China

Dalangzhen 大朗鎮
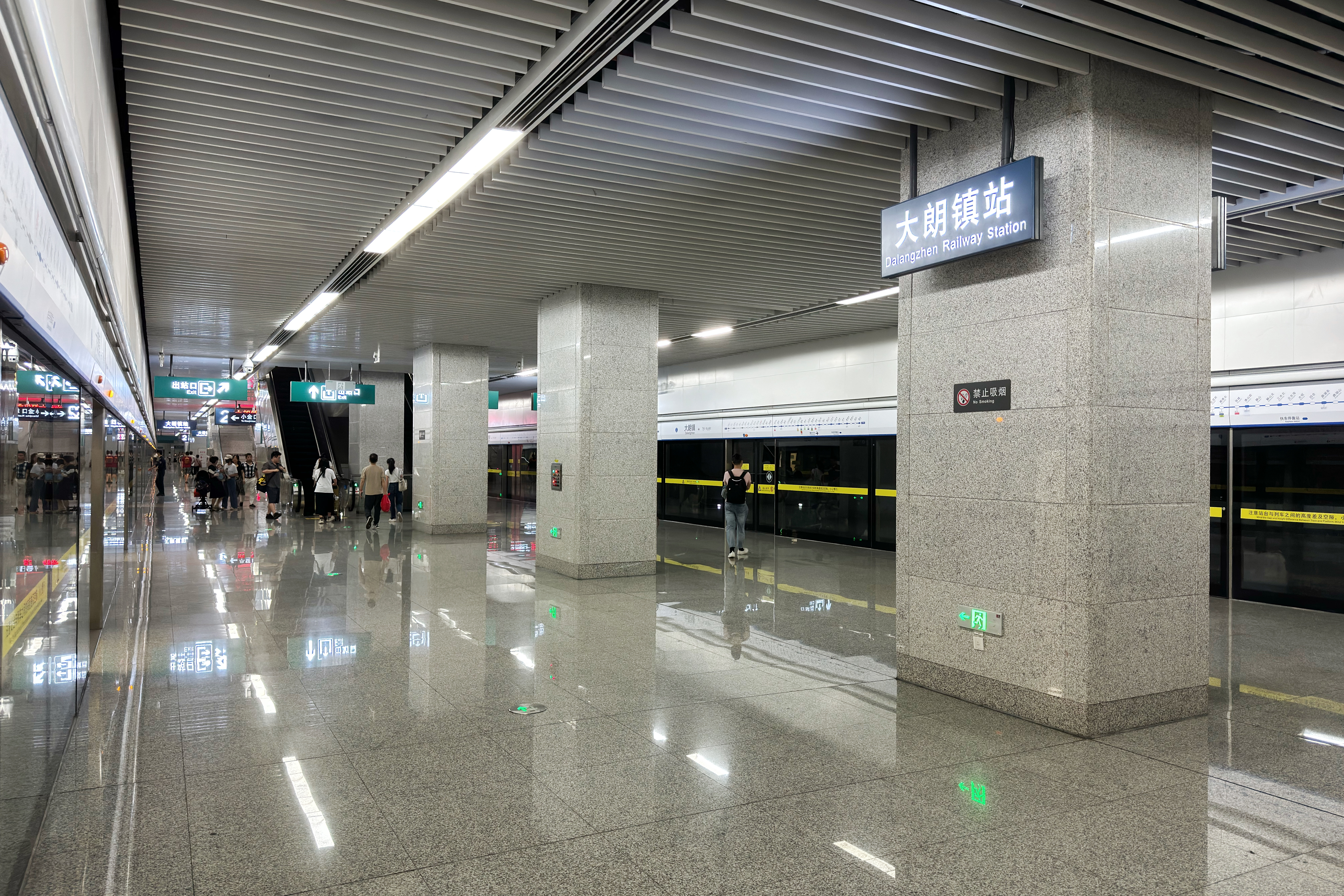
- Platform

Chinese name
- Simplified Chinese: 大朗镇站
- Traditional Chinese: 大朗鎮站
Transcriptions
Standard Mandarin
- Hanyu Pinyin: Dàlǎng Zhèn Zhàn
Yue: Cantonese
- Jyutping: Daai^{6}long^{5} Zan^{3} Zaam^{6}

General information
- Location: Changlang Road (常朗路), Dalang, Dongguan, Guangdong; China
- Coordinates: 22°57′25″N 113°56′37″E
- Owner: Pearl River Delta Metropolitan Region intercity railway
- Operator: Guangdong Intercity Railway Operation Co., Ltd.
- Line: Guangzhou–Huizhou intercity railway
- Platforms: 2 (1 island platform)
- Tracks: 4

Construction
- Structure type: Underground
- Accessible: Yes

Other information
- Station code: KOQ (Pinyin: DLZ)

History
- Opened: 28 December 2017; 8 years ago

Services
Preceding station	Pearl River Delta Metropolitan Region Intercity Railway	Following station
Songshanhu North towards Panyu	Guangzhou–Huizhou intercity railway	Changping South towards Huizhou North
Location

Dalang Town railway station (simplified Chinese: 大朗镇站; traditional Chinese: 大朗鎮站; pinyin: Dàlǎng Zhèn Zhàn; Jyutping: Daai^{6}long^{5} Zan^{3} Zaam^{6}) is a railway station in Dalang, Dongguan, Guangdong, China. It opened on 28 December 2017.

The station has 4 exits planned, lettered A-D. Exits A and D opened when the station opened, Exit B has been built but not opened, and Exit C is reserved.

== History ==
The station was named Dalang during planning and construction and was originally an elevated station. In 2010, after the Ministry of Railways intervened in the construction of the Pearl River Delta Metropolitan Region intercity railway, the line scheme was redesigned. Finally, at the suggestion of Dongguan City and the towns and streets along the line, in order to avoid cutting the urban planning, the urban area of Dongguan and the Liaobu and Changping sections were changed from elevated to underground, so the station was adjusted to an underground station, and moved about 1km eastward to the current site.

In order to avoid the same name as the national railway station, the station was named Dalang Town at the end of 2015.
