= Xiegang =

Xiegang 谢岗镇
- Town
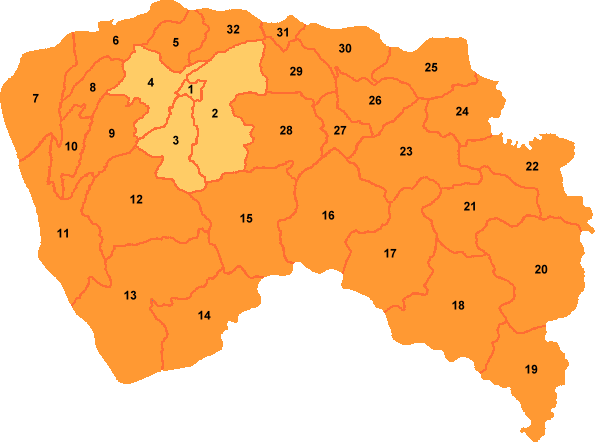
- Xiegang is labelled '22' on this map of Dongguan

- Location in Guangdong
- Coordinates: 22°57′42″N 114°08′55″E
- Country: People's Republic of China
- Province: Guangdong
- Prefecture-level city: Dongguan
- Time zone: UTC+8 (China Standard)

Xiegang (simplified Chinese: 谢岗镇; traditional Chinese: 謝崗鎮; pinyin: Xiègǎng zhèn) is a town under the direct jurisdiction of the prefecture-level city of Dongguan, Guangdong Province, China.

== Administration ==
Xiegang covers an area of 103 square kilometres (40 sq mi) and administers 11 village committees along with one urban neighbourhood community.

== Location ==
Xiegang Town is located in the eastern part of Dongguan City, 30 kilometres (19 mi) from Huizhou in the east, 10 kilometres (6.2 mi) from Zhangmutou, east of Dongguan and Dongguan railway station respectively in the west and 60 kilometres (37 mi) from Shenzhen in the south.

== Transportation ==
Provincial Road S357 and Guangzhou-Meizhou-Shantou Railway intersect within the town.
