= Daojiao, Guangdong =

Daojiao 道滘镇
- Town
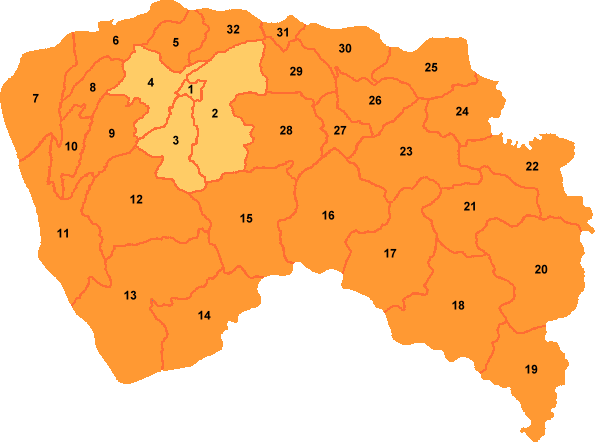
- Daojiao is labeled '9' on this map of Dongguan

- Location in Guangdong
- Coordinates: 23°00′15″N 113°40′30″E
- Country: People's Republic of China
- Province: Guangdong
- Prefecture-level city: Dongguan

Area
  - Total: 54.65 km^{2} (21.10 sq mi)

Population (2020)
  - Total: 159,502
  - Density: 2,919/km^{2} (7,559/sq mi)
- Time zone: UTC+8 (China Standard)

Daojiao (Chinese: 道滘; pinyin: Dàojiào) is a town under the jurisdiction of Dongguan prefecture-level city in the Pearl River Delta region of Guangdong province, China. As of the year 2020, it had a population of 159,502.

== Transportation ==
Daojiao will host two Dongguan Rail Transit stations under the current plans for construction of Line 1:

1. Daojiao
2. Daojiaodong (Dajiao East)
