= Line 3 (Dongguan Rail Transit) =

Planned metro line in Dongguan, China

- 3

Overview
- Other name: R3
- Status: Under Planning
- Locale: Dongguan, Guangdong, China
- Termini: Jiaoyiwan; Dongguan East railway station
- Stations: 20 (Phase 1)

Service
- Type: Rapid transit
- System: Dongguan Rail Transit
- Operator(s): Dongguan Rail Transit Corporation, Limited (东莞市轨道交通有限公司)

Technical
- Line length: 51.5 km (32.0 mi) (Phase 1)
- Number of tracks: 2
- Character: Underground (Phase 1)
- Track gauge: 1,435 mm (4 ft 8 1/2 in)

Line 3 of the Dongguan Rail Transit (Chinese: 东莞轨道交通3号线; pinyin: Dōngguǎn Guǐdào Jiāotōng Sān Hào Xiàn) is a planned rapid transit line in Dongguan, Guangdong Province, China. It has a planned 24 stations from Dongguan East railway station in the Northeast of Dongguan, to Jiaoyiwan in the south of Dongguan. The construction date for Line 3 has not yet been published.

== Stations ==
List of stations of Line 3 (Phase 1)

- Jiaoyiwan
- Jiaoyiwanbei
- Chang'an Jian'an Road
- Chang'an Jinsha
- Chang'an Wushacun
- Chang'an Pedestrian Street
- Chang'an Coach Terminal
- Haiyue Garden
- Songshan Lake Headquarters
- Jinduogang
- Songshan Lake University Town
- Songshan Lake
- Songshan Lake North
- Dongkeng Avenue
- Changping Beihuan Road
- Changpingbei
- Changping Railway Station
- Dongguan East Railway Station

== List of planned lines ==
- Line 1
- Line 2
- Line 3
- Line 4

== See also ==
- Guangzhou Metro
- FMetro
- Shenzhen Metro
- List of rapid transit systems
- Metro systems by annual passenger rides
