= Dalang, Dongguan =

Dalang 大朗镇
- Town
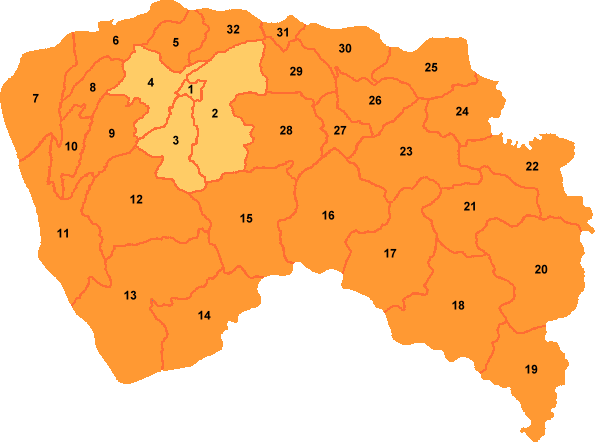
- Dalang is labelled '16' on this map of Dongguan

- Location within Guangdong
- Coordinates: 22°56′26″N 113°56′37″E
- Country: People's Republic of China
- Province: Guangdong
- Prefecture-level city: Dongguan
- Time zone: UTC+8 (China Standard)

Dalang (Chinese: 大朗) is a town under the jurisdiction of Dongguan prefecture-level city in Guangdong province, China.

== Transportation ==
Daojiao will host two Dongguan Rail Transit stations under the plans for construction of Line 1:

1. Dalang West
2. Dalang

There is a bus service from Dalang to Shenzhen Bao'an International Airport in Shenzhen.
