= Machong, Guangdong =

Machong 麻涌镇
- Town
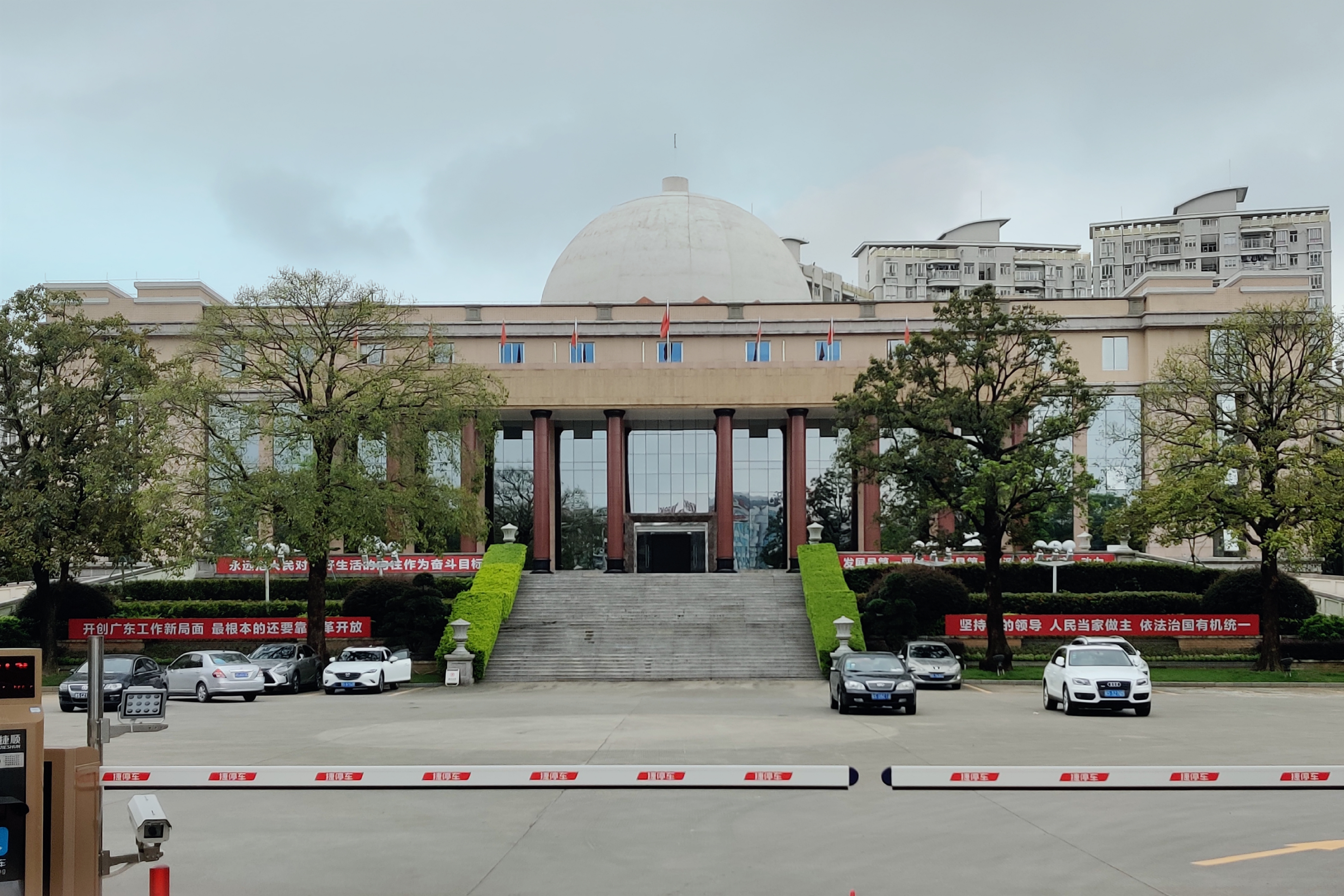
- Machong townhall

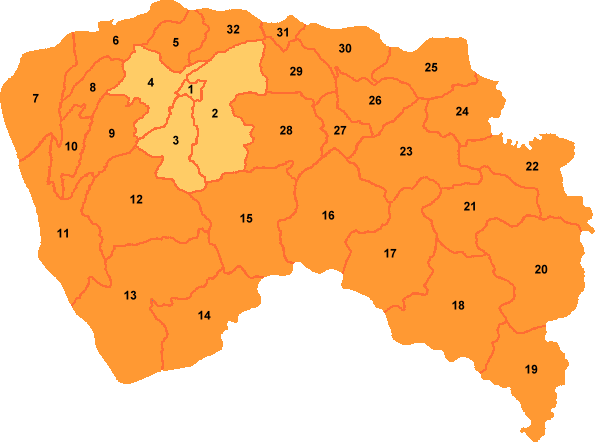
- Machong is labelled '7' on this map of Dongguan

- Location in Guangdong
- Coordinates: 23°03′04″N 113°34′52″E
- Country: People's Republic of China
- Province: Guangdong
- Prefecture-level city: Dongguan
- Time zone: UTC+8 (China Standard)

Machong (simplified Chinese: 麻涌镇; traditional Chinese: 麻湧鎮; pinyin: Máchōng Zhèn), sometimes mispronounced Mayong, is a town under the jurisdiction of the prefecture-level city of Dongguan in the Pearl River Delta region of Guangdong Province, China. It is located at the northwest corner of Dongguan's administration and is the city's westernmost division.

== Economy ==
The town is home to several e-commerce logistics centers of companies including JD.com, Alibaba, DHL, and Cainiao.
