= Dongguan East railway station =

Railway station in Dongguan, China

Coordinates: 22.96771°N 114.03906°E

Dongguandong 东莞东
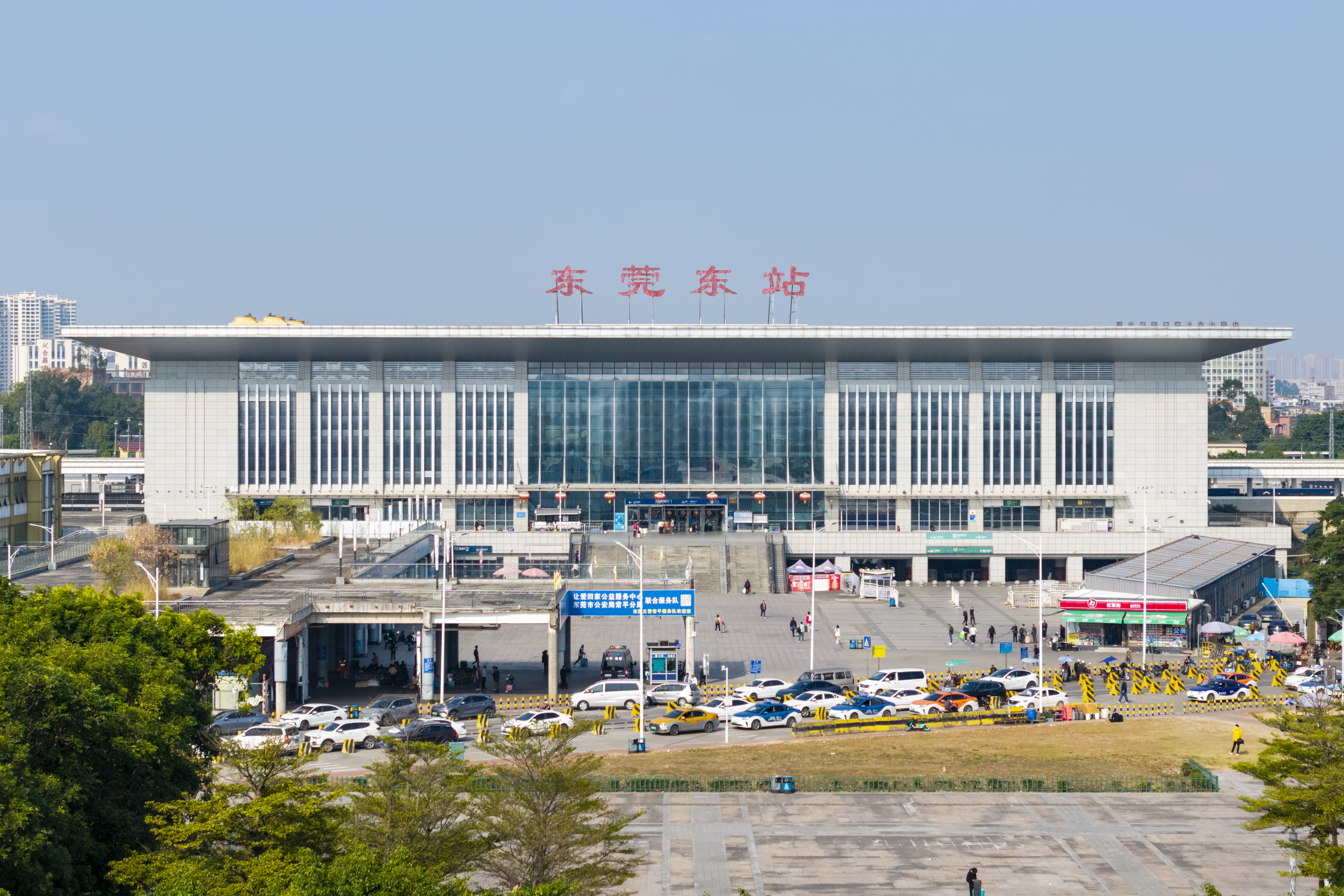
- Exterior

General information
- Location: Changping Town, Dongguan, Guangdong; China
- Connections: Changping East

Services
Preceding station	China Railway	Following station
Huizhou West towards Beijing West	Beijing–Kowloon railway	Changping towards Hung Hom
Location

Dongguandong (Dongguan East) railway station serves the city of Dongguan in Guangdong province, China. It is located in Dongguan's Changping Town.

The station is configured in an east-west alignment. Trains departing to the east continue along the Beijing–Kowloon railway towards Beijing. To the west, there is a junction where the Beijing–Kowloon railway merges with the Guangzhou–Shenzhen railway. The Guangzhou–Shenzhen railway continues south towards Hong Kong. The Guangzhou–Shenzhen railway continues east through Dongguan railway station then onwards towards Guangzhou. There are also trains to other parts of China and to Shenzhen.

The station has a large main terminal with several floors, that serves trains to Hong Kong. In the main building, there is a customs gate, several shops, a fast food outlet, a ticket booth and office buildings above it. The smaller connected terminal serves domestic trains. It contains a small shop, several ticket machines, and a ticket booth.

== Metro ==
Dongguan East railway station will be served by Line 3 of Dongguan Metro, which is under planning.
