= Line 1 (Dongguan Rail Transit) =

Metro line in Dongguan, China

- 1
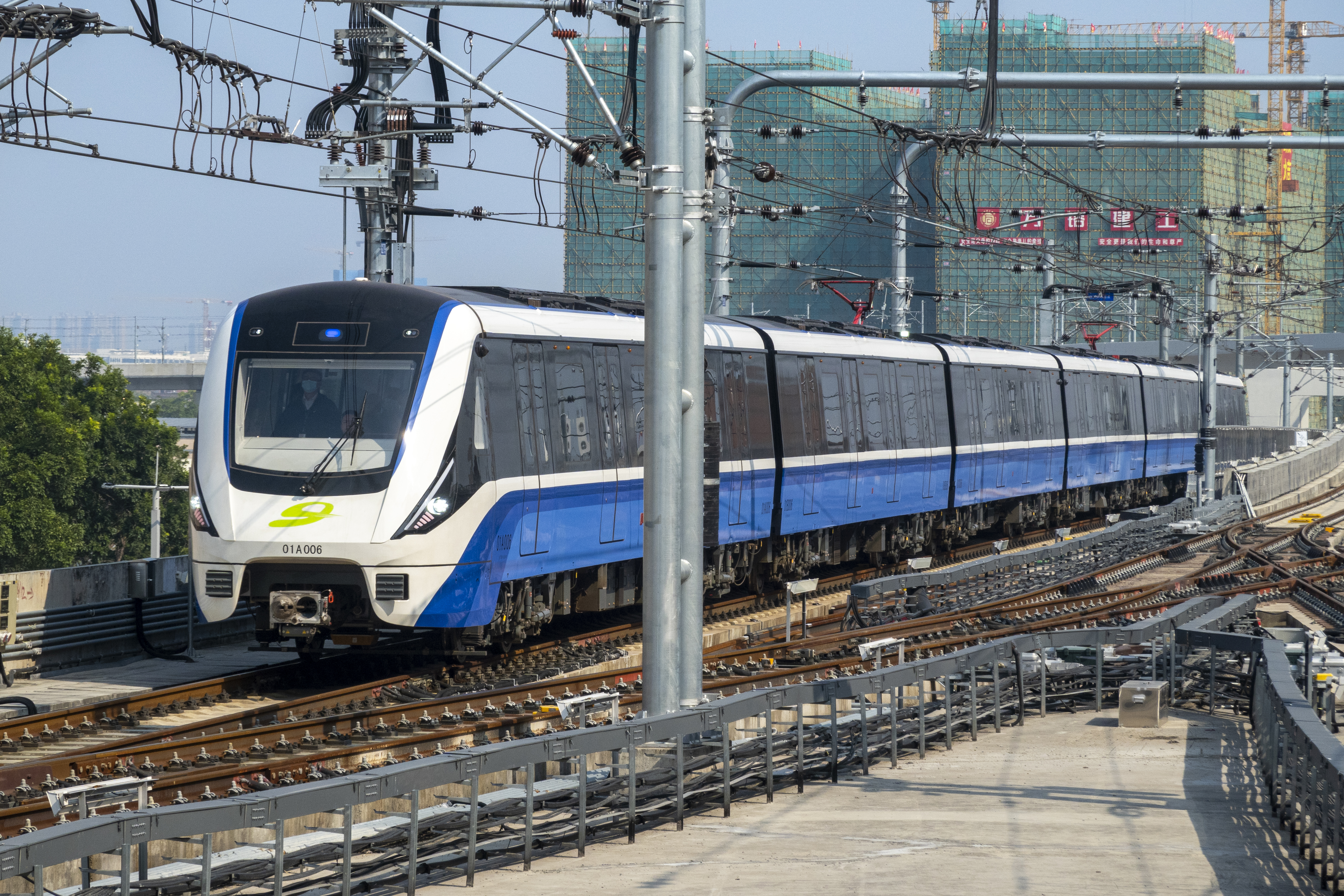
- Line 1 train entering Houde station

Overview
- Other name: R1
- Status: In operation
- Locale: Dongguan, Guangdong
- Termini: Dongguanxi Railway Station; Meitang
- Stations: 25 (Phase 1)

Service
- Type: Rapid transit
- System: Dongguan Rail Transit
- Operator(s): Dongguan Rail Transit Corporation, Limited (东莞市轨道交通有限公司)

History
- Opened: 28 November 2025; 40 days ago

Technical
- Line length: 57.46 km (35.70 mi) (Phase 1)
- Number of tracks: 2
- Character: Underground and elevated
- Track gauge: 1,435 mm (4 ft 8 1/2 in)

Line 1 of the Dongguan Rail Transit (Chinese: 东莞轨道交通1号线; pinyin: Dōngguǎn Guǐdào Jiāotōng Yī Hào Xiàn), is a rapid transit line in operation in Dongguan, Guangdong. Phase 1 of Line 1 connects Dongguanxi Railway Station in the North with Meitang in the south. It is 57.46 km in length (including 49.44 km underground section).

The Phase 1 of Line 1 in Dongguan started construction in September 2018. The five-station extension to Huangpu New Port station has not yet been approved by National Development and Reform Commission and has no published timeline.

== Stations ==
Station No.	Station name		Connections	Distance km	Location	Section
Station No.	English	Chinese	Connections	Distance km	Location	Section
	Huangpu New Port	黄埔新港	5		Huangpu (Guangzhou)	Line 1 Extension (long-term planning)
	Dashengcun	大盛村			Dongguan	Line 1 Extension (long-term planning)
	Machong Avenue	麻涌大道			Dongguan	Line 1 Extension (long-term planning)
	Machongxi	麻涌西			Dongguan	Line 1 Extension (long-term planning)
	Machongdong	麻涌东			Dongguan	Line 1 Extension (long-term planning)
101	Dongguanxi Railway Station	东莞西站	GH SS (Dongguanxi (WGQ))		Dongguan	Phase 1 of Line 1
102	Houde	厚德			Dongguan	Phase 1 of Line 1
103	Changping	昌平			Dongguan	Phase 1 of Line 1
104	People's Hospital	人民医院			Dongguan	Phase 1 of Line 1
105	Quhai	曲海			Dongguan	Phase 1 of Line 1
106	Batou	坝头			Dongguan	Phase 1 of Line 1
107	Yuanmei	元美			Dongguan	Phase 1 of Line 1
108	Central Square	中心广场			Dongguan	Phase 1 of Line 1
109	Civic Center (Note: Was Hongfu Road (鸿福路) until 15 October 2025)	市民中心	2		Dongguan	Phase 1 of Line 1
110	Lixin	立新			Dongguan	Phase 1 of Line 1
111	Dongchengnan Railway Station	东城南站	Dongchengnan (IYQ) GH		Dongguan	Phase 1 of Line 1
112	Tongsha Park	同沙公园			Dongguan	Phase 1 of Line 1
113	Niushan	牛山			Dongguan	Phase 1 of Line 1
114	Lianping	连平			Dongguan	Phase 1 of Line 1
115	Dalingshan	大岭山			Dongguan	Phase 1 of Line 1
116	Jinju	金桔			Dongguan	Phase 1 of Line 1
117	Guangdong Medical University	广东医大			Dongguan	Phase 1 of Line 1
118	Songshan Lake	松山湖	3		Dongguan	Phase 1 of Line 1
119	Songfo	松佛			Dongguan	Phase 1 of Line 1
120	Dalang	大朗			Dongguan	Phase 1 of Line 1
121	Lixiang Park	荔香公园			Dongguan	Phase 1 of Line 1
122	Fengshan	凤山			Dongguan	Phase 1 of Line 1
123	Huangjiang	黄江			Dongguan	Phase 1 of Line 1
124	Huangniupu	黄牛埔			Dongguan	Phase 1 of Line 1
125	Meitang	梅塘	4		Dongguan	Phase 1 of Line 1

== See also ==
- Guangzhou Metro
- FMetro
- Shenzhen Metro
- List of rapid transit systems
- Metro systems by annual passenger rides
