= Liaobu =

Liaobu 寮步镇
- Town
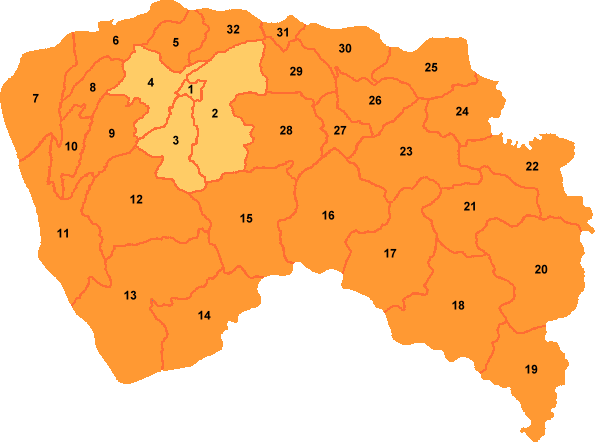
- Liaobu is labelled '28' on this map of Dongguan

- Location in Guangdong
- Coordinates: 22°59′51″N 113°52′29″E
- Country: People's Republic of China
- Province: Guangdong
- Prefecture-level city: Dongguan
- Time zone: UTC+8 (China Standard)

Liaobu (Chinese: 寮步; pinyin: Liáobù) is a town under the direct jurisdiction of the prefecture-level city of Dongguan, in the Pearl River Delta region of Guangdong, China. The town is located to the east of downtown Dongguan and has an area of 87.5 square kilometres (33.8 sq mi) and had a population of 418,578 as of the 2010 census.
