= Changping, Guangdong =

Changping 常平镇
- Town
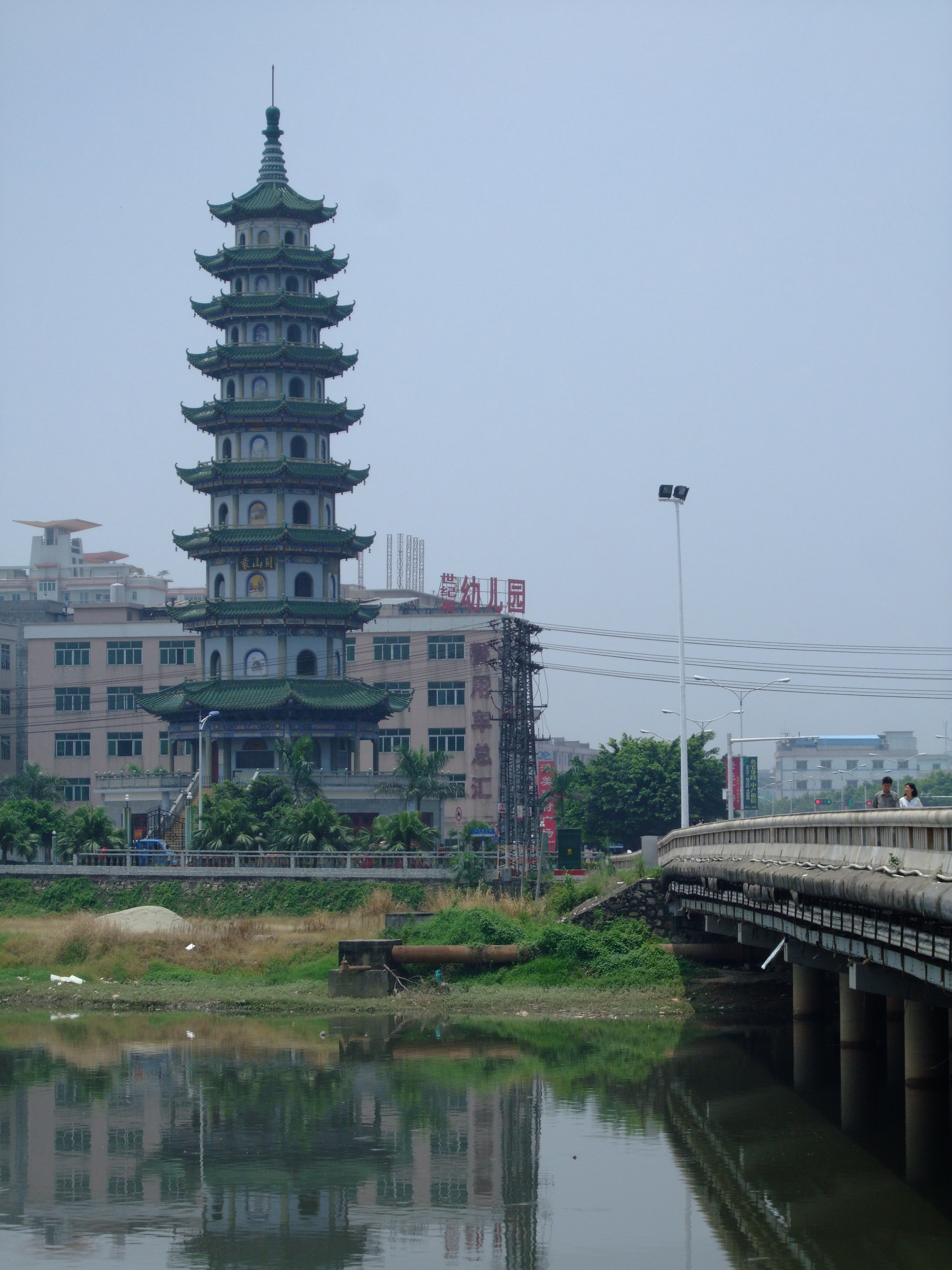
- view at the river in Changping

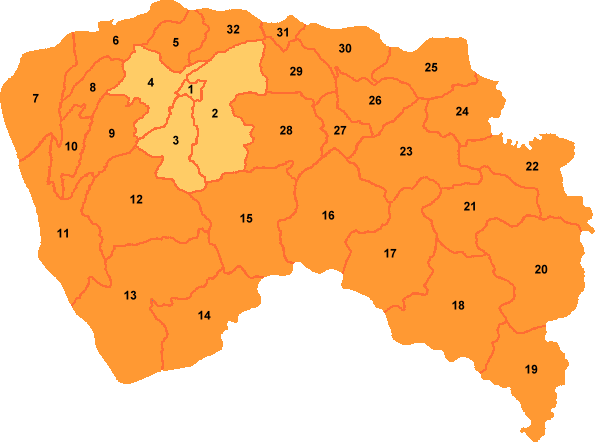
- Changping is labeled '23' on this map of Dongguan

- Location in Guangdong
- Coordinates: 22°58′32″N 113°59′32″E
- Country: People's Republic of China
- Province: Guangdong
- Prefecture-level city: Dongguan
- Time zone: UTC+8 (China Standard)

Changping town (Chinese: 常平镇; pinyin: Chángpíng zhèn; lit. 'long peace') is a town under the direct administration of the prefecture-level city of Dongguan, in Guangdong province, China, located to the east of downtown Dongguan. The town has a total area of 108 km^{2} (42 sq mi) and a population of 500,000.

== Transportation ==
The town is at the confluence of the Jingjiu, Guangzhou-Meizhou-Shantou and the Guangshen Railway, providing convenient links to many areas around China.

Dongguan railway station and Dongguan East railway station are located in the town, and a through train links directly from the Hung Hom station in Kowloon, Hong Kong. Changping also has two bus stations. Because of this, it is one of many border crossings from Hong Kong into mainland China and is also a popular way to come into mainland China for some during weekends.

Changping has several types of hire transportation, both licensed and unlicensed, including automobile, tuk-tuk, motorcycle, and cycle rickshaw. There are three types of automobile taxis in the town. The yellow and green automobile taxis are local taxis driven by local people (often former motorcycle taxis drivers.) A short ride will cost only seven yuan. The light blue taxis are Dongguan City taxis. While the ride will cost a little more than a local taxi these cars will drive to areas all around Dongguan. Unlicensed rogue taxis are anyone with a car or microvan looking to make money selling rides around town. Rogue taxis do not use a meter and will typically charge a flat rate of 15 yuan per trip into the town centre.

There is a bus service from Changping to Shenzhen Bao'an International Airport in Shenzhen.

== See also ==
- Dongguan East railway station
- Changping railway station
