= Zhangmutou =

Zhangmutou 樟木头镇
- Town
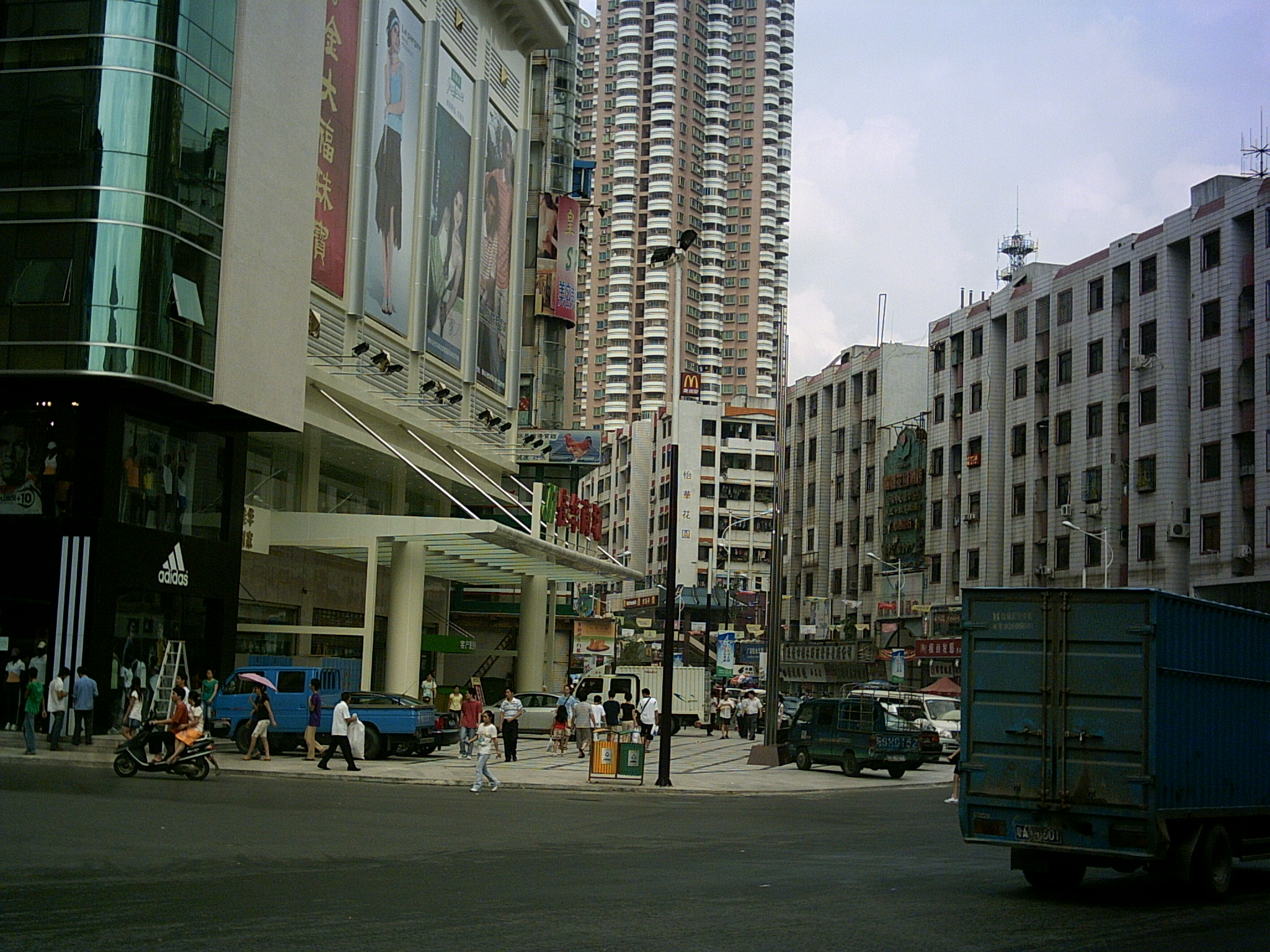
- Zhangmutou town centre in 2006

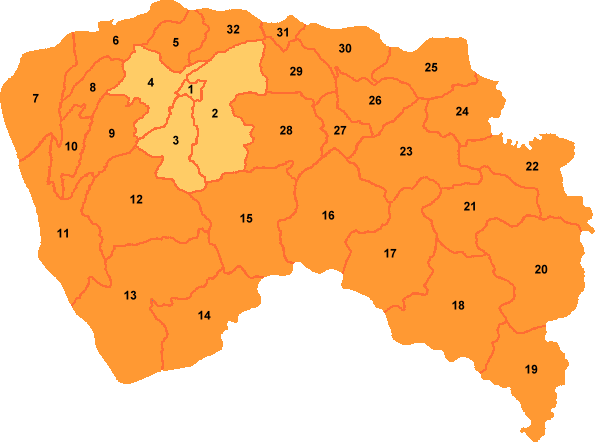
- Zhangmutou is labelled '21' on this map of Dongguan

- Location within Guangdong
- Coordinates (Zhangmutou government): 22°54′54″N 114°05′00″E
- Country: People's Republic of China
- Province: Guangdong
- Prefecture-level city: Dongguan
- Time zone: UTC+8 (China Standard)
- Website: dgzmt.gov.cn

Zhangmutou
- Simplified Chinese: 樟木头
- Traditional Chinese: 樟木頭
- Hakka: Zong^{1}muk^{5}tiu^{2} (Meixian); Chông-muk-thèu (Sixian)
- Literal meaning: Head of (a) camphor tree(s)
Transcriptions
Standard Mandarin
- Hanyu Pinyin: Zhāngmùtóu
- Bopomofo: ㄓㄤ ㄇㄨˋ ㄊㄡˊ
- Gwoyeu Romatzyh: Jangmuhtour
- Wade–Giles: Chang^{1}mu^{4}tʻou^{2}
- Tongyong Pinyin: Jhangmùtóu
- Yale Romanization: Jāngmùtóu
- MPS2: Jāng mù tóu (Note: Hyphens could also be used in place of spaces as Jāng-mù-tóu.)
- IPA: [ʈʂáŋ.mû tʰǒʊ]
Hakka
- Romanization: Zong^{1}muk^{5}tiu^{2} (Meixian); Chông-muk-thèu (Sixian)
Yue: Cantonese
- Yale Romanization: Jēungmuhktàuh (Note: Likewise, using numbers in lieu of tone marks is valid as Jeung^{1}muk^{6}tau^{4}.)
- Jyutping: Zoeng1muk6tau4
- Canton Romanization: Zêng^{1}mug^{6}teo^{4}
- Hong Kong Romanisation: Tseung Muk Tau (Note: 樟 and 木 could be Tseong and Mook respectively as well.); Cheung Muk Tau (Note: 樟 and 木 could be Cheong and Mook respectively as well.)
- IPA: [tsœŋ˥.mʊk̚˨.tʰɐw˩]

Zhangmutou is a town under the direct jurisdiction of the prefecture-level city of Dongguan in Guangdong province, China. The town was called Taian (泰安) in Ming dynasty. It was renamed to its current name Zhangmutou, literally the camphor tree head, in Qing dynasty, because camphor trees were widely planted around the town.

== Overview ==
It is named for the abundant camphor trees (Chinese: 樟木; pinyin: zhāngmù) which existed at one time. It has many flats built and tailored toward expats. It is also a favorite retirement destination and attracts Hong Kong residents as the price is much lower than nearby Hong Kong. The predominant spoken languages are Hakka, Mandarin and Cantonese.

== See also ==
- Zhangmutou railway station
