= Guangzhou–Kowloon through train =

Chinese intercity rail service

Guangzhou–Kowloon through train 廣九直通車
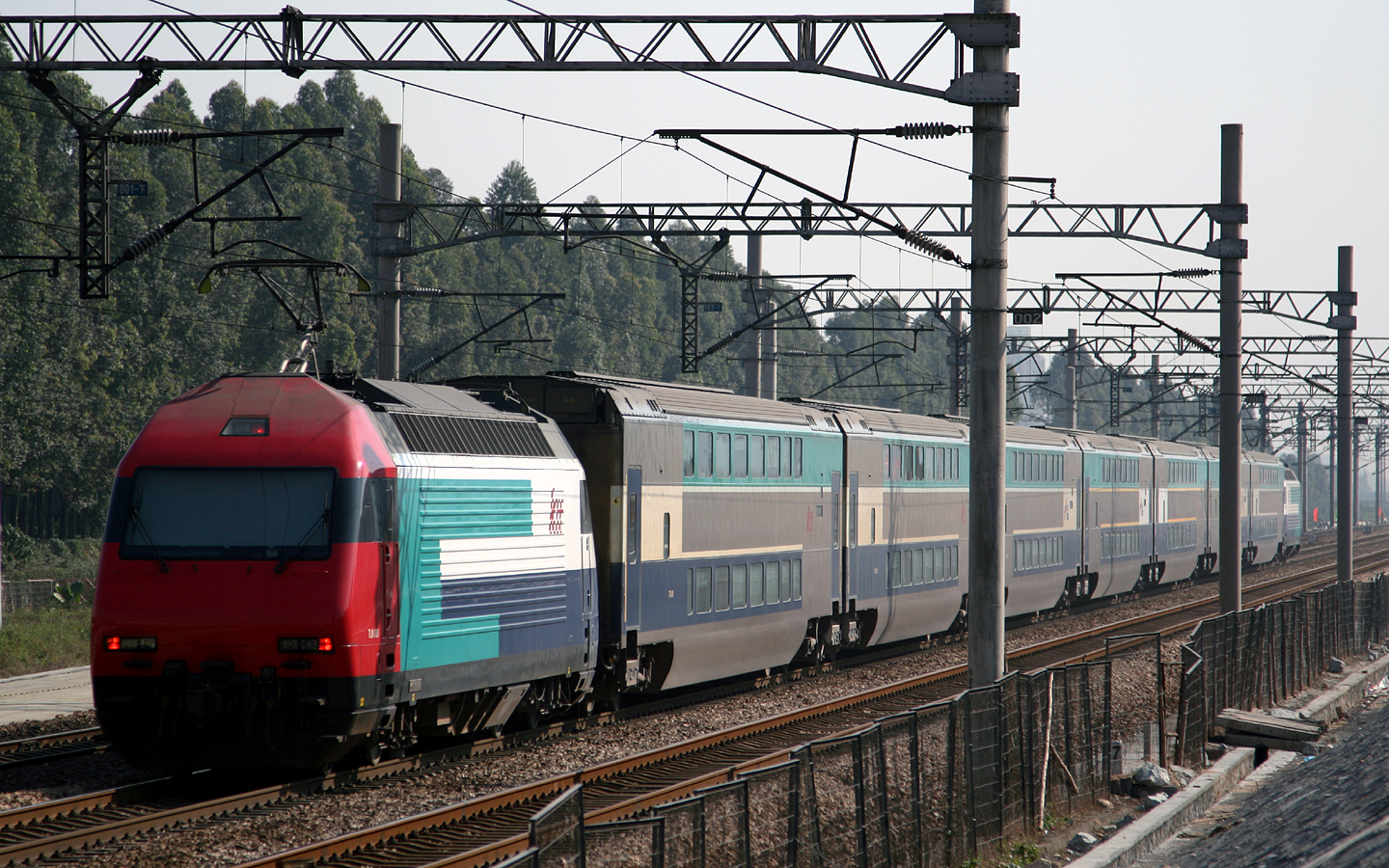
- A KTT train provided by Hong Kong's MTR Corporation

Overview
- Service type: Inter-city rail
- Locale: Guangdong Province; Hong Kong
- First service: 5 October 1911
- Last service: 29 January 2020
- Current operators: MTR Corporation; CR Guangzhou

Route
- Termini: Guangzhou East; Hung Hom

Technical
- Track gauge: 1,435 mm (4 ft 8 1/2 in)
- Electrification: 25 kV 50 Hz Overhead catenary
- Track owners: China Railway (mainland section); KCRC (Hong Kong section)

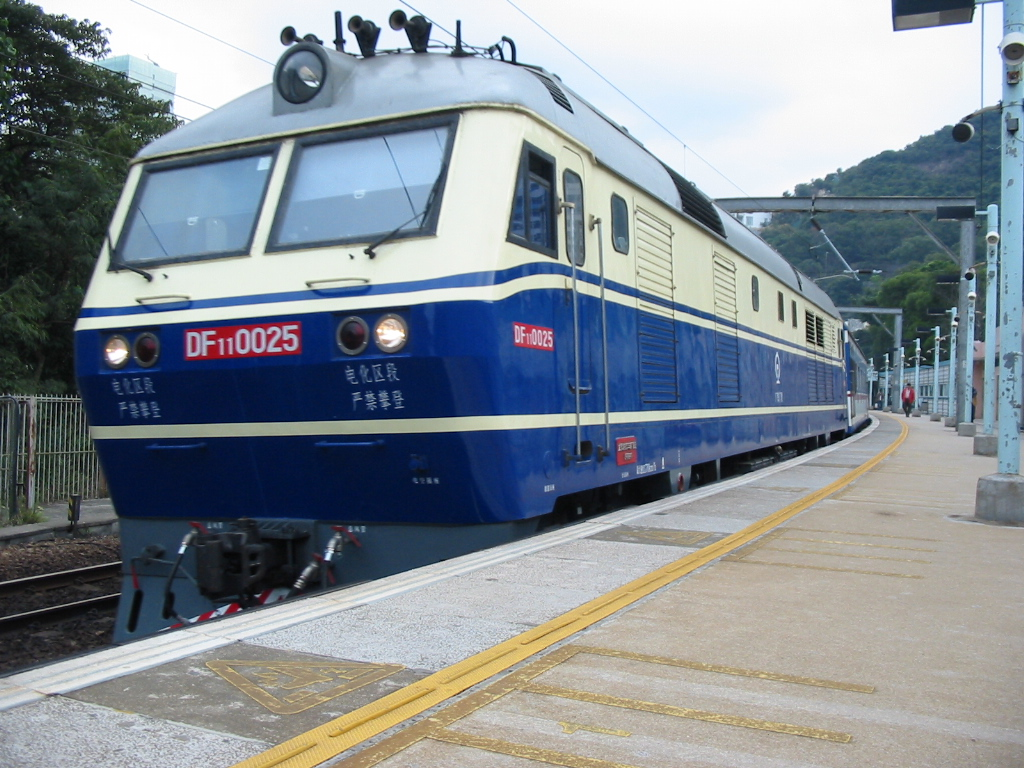
A China Railways DF11 locomotive hauling 25Z train cabs provided by the China Railway Corporation passing through University station in Hong Kong

The Guangzhou–Kowloon through train (simplified Chinese: 广九直通车 or 港穗直通车; traditional Chinese: 廣九直通車 or 港穗直通車; pinyin: Guǎngjiǔ Zhítōngchē or Găngsuì Zhítōngchē) was an inter-city railway service between Hong Kong and Guangzhou jointly operated by the MTR Corporation of Hong Kong and the Guangzhou Railway Group of mainland China. Services operated along the East Rail line within Hong Kong territory, crossing the Hong Kong–Chinese border at Lo Wu, and continuing along the Guangmao Railway and Guangshen Railway in Guangdong province.

Twelve trains ran in each direction every day, with a journey time of 1 hour 40 minutes.

The MTRC operated the KTT service on this route. The KTT service was provided by double-decker trains, usually comprising two Premium Class carriages and five First Class carriages. China Railway Guangzhou Group provided the other trains on this route.

Places served by the MTR Guangzhou–Kowloon Through Train included: Hong Kong, Dongguan, Guangzhou. The service had been suspended since the outbreak of COVID-19, and officially discontinued on 31 July 2024, following an announcement by the General Administration of Customs on the closure of all four railway ports of the inter-city through trains, citing that the travel needs had been met by high-speed rail services from Hong Kong West Kowloon to Guangzhou East.

== History ==
=== Early years ===
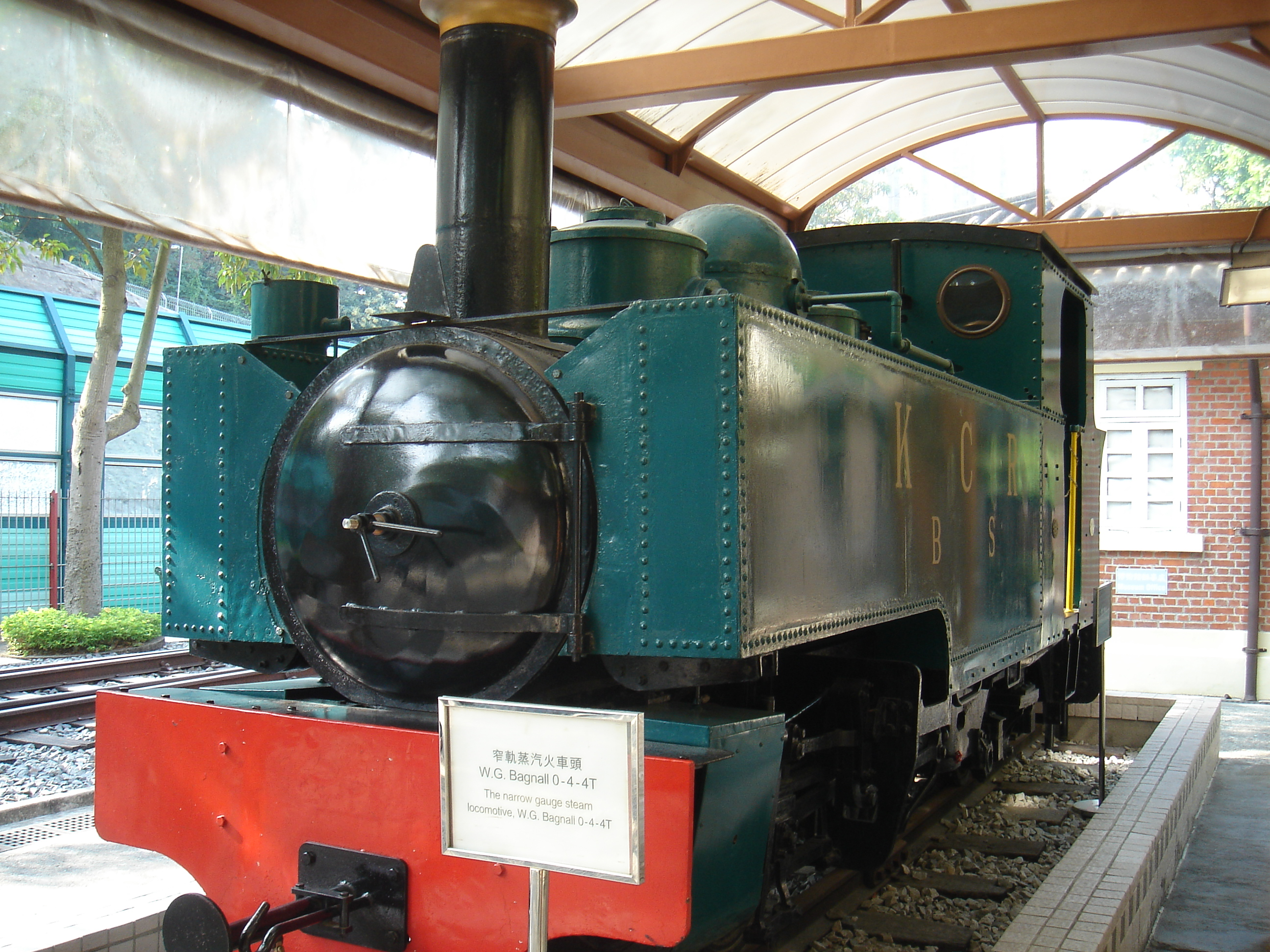
Steam locomotive W.G. Bagnall 0-4-4T, used in former Sha Tau Kok Branch Line.

The original line of the Chinese section was called the Canton–Kowloon Railway and the British section was called the Kowloon–Canton Railway (KCR), which later stretched a rapid transit network in the other New Territories regions in Hong Kong. The engineering partnership Messrs Arthur John Barry and John Wolfe-Barry were Consulting Engineers to the project.

The segment within Hong Kong, then a British Crown colony, was known as the British section. Construction began in 1906, and it was opened on 1 October 1910 as a single-track system, roughly corresponding to the present-day East Rail line).

The complete railway between Kowloon in Hong Kong and the Chinese city of Canton (Guangzhou) was opened on 5 October 1911. With the Chinese section opened in 1911, through-trains ran from the southern terminus in Tsim Sha Tsui across the border to the southern Chinese city of Canton at Tai Sha Tau station. Trains were steam-hauled. From the one-line railroad, the KCR network was expanded to three railway lines and a light railway system, with 32 railway stations and 68 light rail stations.

At first trains on the British Section ran northwards from a temporary terminus at Kowloon Point through the eastern New Territories up to the border with China at Lo Wu. The permanent southern terminus, Kowloon station in Tsim Sha Tsui, opened later in 1914.

A narrow gauge railway operating works trains was used in the construction of the standard gauge British Section. The narrow gauge materials were later used to build the now-defunct Sha Tau Kok Branch.

=== Modern era ===
After the establishment of the People's Republic of China in 1949, through-trains were initially unable to cross the border, a situation that persisted for thirty years. On 4 April 1979, the through train service between Canton (Guangzhou) and Hung Hom resumed after agreement between Hong Kong and Chinese authorities. In January 1993, the service was extended to Foshan, and to Zhaoqing on 28 March 1995. Starting from 8 October 1995, some trains stopped at Changping station in Dongguan. In 1996, the northern terminus was relocated from Guangzhou railway station to Guangzhou East station.

Train service to Zhaoqing ended on 16 April 2017 due to renovation. Service to Foshan also stopped from 10 July 2019 following the opening of Guangzhou–Shenzhen–Hong Kong Express Rail Link. Both border crossings closed on 15 December 2021, ruling out any return of the through train service to the two cities.

=== Suspension and discontinuation ===
The through train service was suspended on 30 January 2020 due to the outbreak of COVID-19 in Hong Kong. Sources in April 2022 said the train service would not resume due to the Express Rail Link service extending to Guangzhou east station.

On 31 July 2024, the General Administration of Customs announced the closure of all remaining four railway ports for the inter-city through trains, which was already approved by the State Council in June 2024, marking the official discontinuation of the service. The cited reason for the discontinuation was that the high-speed passenger trains have effectively met the travel needs between the mainland and Hong Kong.

== Stations ==
=== Historic stations ===
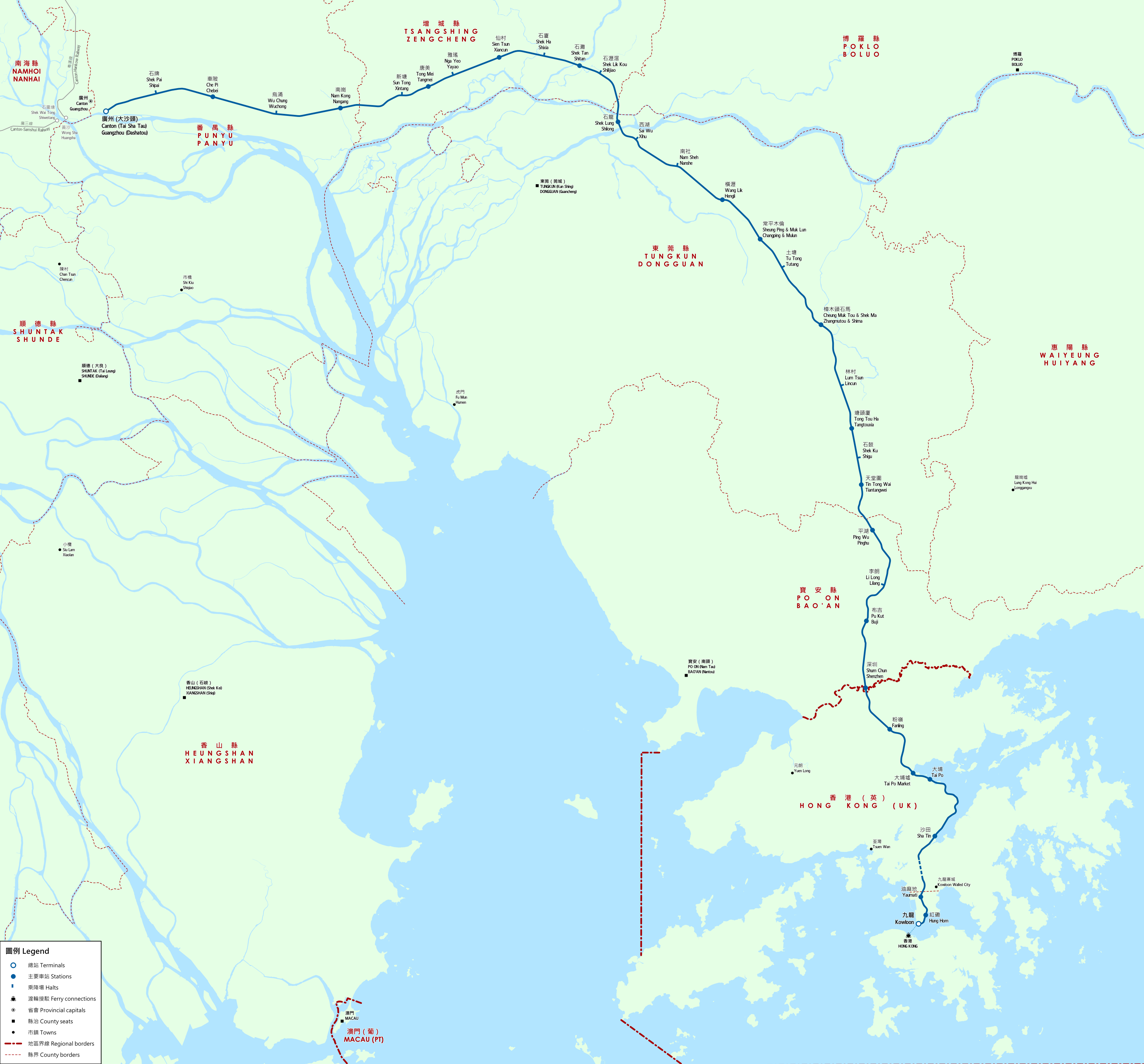
Map of Kowloon–Canton Railway service in 1911

The following shows the stations served by the through train in 1911 upon the commencement of service. Most of them became stops of Guangzhou–Shenzhen railway. The through train service was suspended on 14 October 1949 after Communist China occupied Canton, and was only resumed on 4 April 1979.

During this period, the through train service included new stops, such as in Tin Ho (天河), Wan Luk (雲麓), Sheung Shui (上水).

Name		District	Opened in	Closed in
English	Chinese	District	Opened in	Closed in
Canton also Tai Sha Tau	廣州／大沙頭	Canton, Kwangtung	1911	1974
Shek Pai	石牌	Canton, Kwangtung	1911	–
Che Pi	車陂	Punyu, Kwangtung	1911	–
Wu Chung	烏涌	Punyu, Kwangtung	1911	–
Nam Kong	南崗	Punyu, Kwangtung	1911	2009
Sun Tong	新塘	Tsengshing County, Kwangtung	1911	–
Tong Mei	塘美	Tsengshing County, Kwangtung	1911	2007
Nga Yeo	雅瑤	Tsengshing County, Kwangtung	1911	?
Sien Tsun	仙村	Tsengshing County, Kwangtung	1911	–
Shek Ha	石廈	Tsengshing County, Kwangtung	1911	?
Shek Tan	石灘	Tsengshing County, Kwangtung	1911	–
Shek Lik Kou	石瀝滘	Tsengshing County, Kwangtung	1911	–
Shek Lung	石龍	Tungkun County, Kwangtung	1911	–
Sai Wu (Note: Located on the west of present-day Chashan station, north of present-day Dongguan railway station. This section was later straightened to current route.) also Cha Shan	西湖／茶山	Tungkun County, Kwangtung	1911	–
Nam Sheh	南社	Tungkun County, Kwangtung	1911	2007
Wang Lik	橫瀝	Tungkun County, Kwangtung	1911	2009
Sheung Ping & Muk Lun also Sheung Ping	常平木倫	Tungkun County, Kwangtung	1911	–
Tu Tong	土塘	Tungkun County, Kwangtung	1911	–
Cheung Muk Tou & Shek Ma also Cheung Muk Tou	樟木頭石馬	Tungkun County, Kwangtung	1911	–
Lum Tsun	林村	Tungkun County, Kwangtung	1911	2010
Tong Tou Ha	塘頭廈	Tungkun County, Kwangtung	1911	–
Shek Ku	石鼓	Tungkun County, Kwangtung	1911	2007
Tin Tong Wai	天堂圍	Tungkun County, Kwangtung	1911	2007
Ping Wu	平湖	Sun On County, Kwangtung	1911	–
Li Long	李朗	Sun On County, Kwangtung	1911	2007
Pu Kut	布吉	Sun On County, Kwangtung	1911	–
Shum Chun also Sham Chun Market	深圳／深圳墟	Sun On County, Kwangtung	1911	–
↑ Chinese section | British section ↓				
Lo Wu	羅湖	New Territories, Hong Kong	1949	–
Sheung Shui	上水	New Territories, Hong Kong	1930	–
Fanling	粉嶺	New Territories, Hong Kong	1910 (Note: Kowloon was open under a temporary structure until 1916)	–
Tai Po Market	大埔墟	New Territories, Hong Kong	1910	1983
Tai Po Kau	大埔滘	New Territories, Hong Kong	1910	1983
Sha Tin	沙田	New Territories, Hong Kong	1910	-
Mong Kok (Note: called Yaumati (油麻地) until 1969)	旺角	Kowloon, Hong Kong (Note: Kowloon only included south of Boundary Street at that time and did not include New Kowloon. However, there were no stations within New Kowloon until Kowloon Tong station was established.)	1910	-
Hung Hom (Note: This Hung Hom station is different from the current one and was located near present-day Hong Kong Museum of History.)	紅磡	Kowloon, Hong Kong	1910	1921
Kowloon	九龍	Kowloon, Hong Kong	1910	1975

=== Modern service (ended 2020) ===
Name		District	Service	
English	Chinese	District	Started in	Ended in
Hung Hom	紅磡	Kowloon, Hong Kong	1979	2020
Changping	常平	Dongguan, Guangdong	1995	2020
Guangzhou East	廣州東	Guangzhou, Guangdong	1996	2020
Guangzhou	廣州	Guangzhou, Guangdong	1979	1996
Foshan	佛山	Foshan, Guangdong	1993	2019
Zhaoqing	肇慶	Zhaoqing, Guangdong	1995	2017

== See also ==
- Guangzhou–Shenzhen–Hong Kong Express Rail Link
