= China Railways Type 24 rolling stock =

China Railway Type 24 carriage
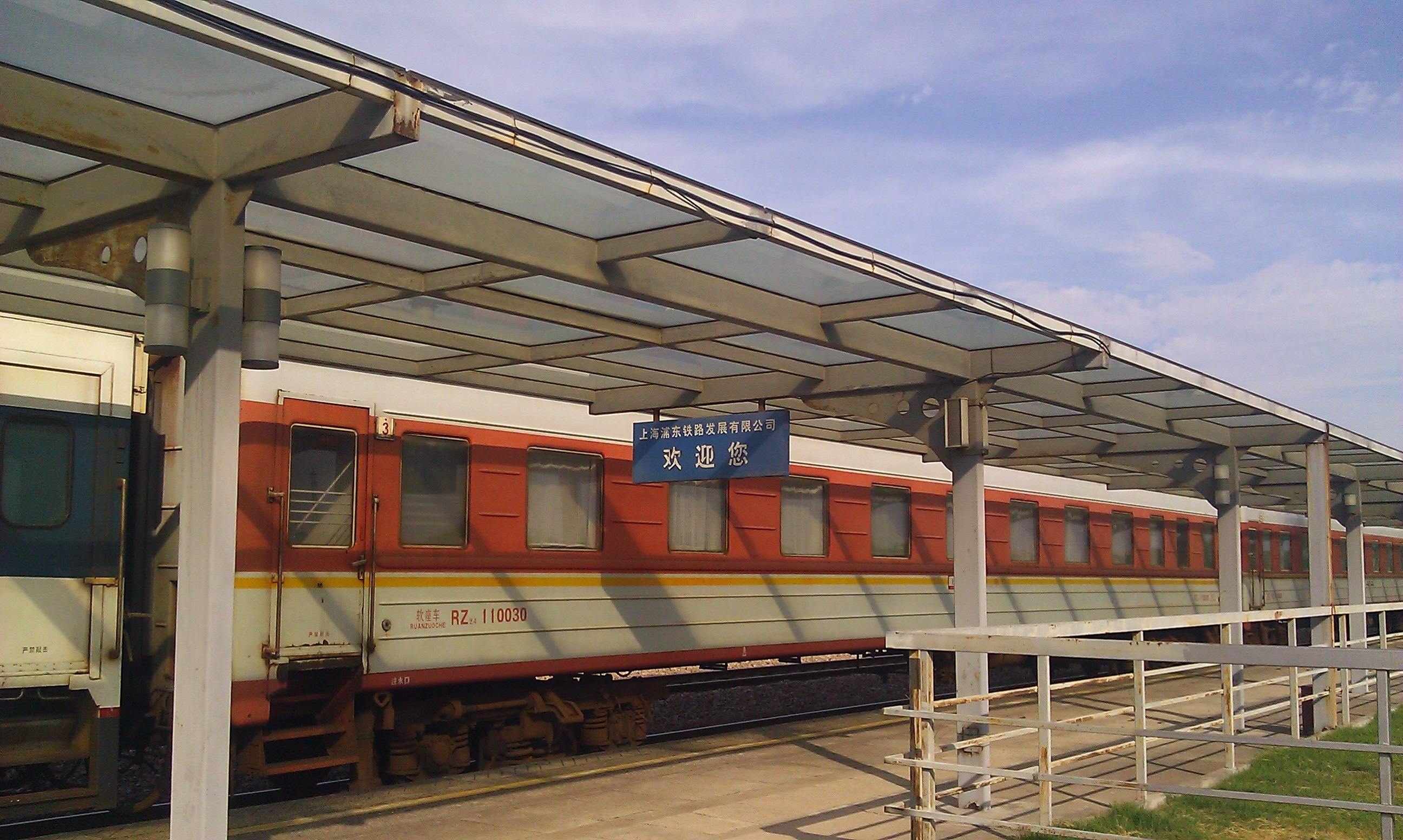
- A RZ24 (East German) carriage in a mixed consist with Type 25T carriages
- Stock type: Sifang: RZ_{24}、TZ_{24} East German：RZ_{24}、RW_{24}、CA_{24}
- Manufacturer: Qingdao Sifang (first series); Deutsche Waggonbau (second series)
- Assembly: China; East Germany
- Predecessor: China Railway Type 22 rolling stock (Sifang, first series)

Specifications
- Maximum speed: 120 kilometres per hour (75 mph) (first series); 140 kilometres per hour (87 mph) (second series)
- Bogies: first series: 202 second series: 211C, 211D; 212 (buffet car)z
- Track gauge: 1,435 mm (4 ft 8 1/2 in)

The Type 24 is a class of two unrelated carriages of China Railway. The two different types can be separated into those built in 1966 for air conditioned services on the Guangshen railway and those imported in the 1980s from East Germany, which consisted mostly soft seaters, but also a few hard sleepers.

== RZ24 (Guangshen railway) ==
External image
- Two Type 24 carriages, a soft seater and a luggage/generator car

To provide a better comfort for foreign visitors on service 91/92 running on the Guangshen railway, Qingdao Sifang designed a first generation air conditioned soft seater passenger cars, labeled at the time as "RZ24 Guangshen air conditioned carriage", and numbered as type 24. Only one such set was built, consisting nine soft seat cars (RZ_{24}, factory code SFK13), a snacks and buffet car mixed soft seat car (RZ_{24}, factory code SFK14) and a luggage car/generator car (TZ_{24}, as at the time, the prefix for air-conditioning generator had not yet been created (KD), and thus used the code for "special vehicles" ie. TZ; it had the factory code SFK12) for a total of 11 carriages.

The type 24 carriage had the same body structure as the Type 22, featuring a thin wall structure supported by a beam in the centre and additional reinforcements for the walls, although the windows were made wider at 1,500 mm (4.9 ft). Each carriage weighed 43.5 tons and used the type 202 bogie. It had a top speed of 120 km/h (75 mph). It had a two by two layout with reclining seats for a total capacity of 64 passengers, except for the carriages at either end, which were limited to 62 people. The air conditioning was powered by a generator car. The mixed soft seat and buffet car had a lower capacity at 26 seated passengers, with another 24 in the restaurant area., which also contained the AV broadcast room and conductor's room. The luggage/generator car had two 200 kW generators. These carriages started operation in August 1966, and it also operated in 1979 with the Guangzhou-Kowloon through train, hauled by a DF3.

The Guangshen Type 24 used air conditioning built in Tianjin, but due to technological immaturities, various faults occurred, such as leaking coolant and broken valves. In 1973, the carriages were switched to air conditioning units built in Nanjing.

=== Carriage composition ===
The Type 24 Guangshen air-conditioned carriages were arranged in the following manner in operation:

Carriage position	1	2	3-5	6	7-10	11
Carriage modeltypefactory code	TZ24 luggage generator carSFK12	RZ24 soft seat (foreigners' car)SFK13	RZ24 soft seatSFK13	RZ24 soft seat buffetSFK13	RZ24 soft seatSFK13	RZ24 soft seat (foreigners' car)SFK13

External image
- An East German Type 24 carriage displayed in Leipzig

== East German Type 24 ==
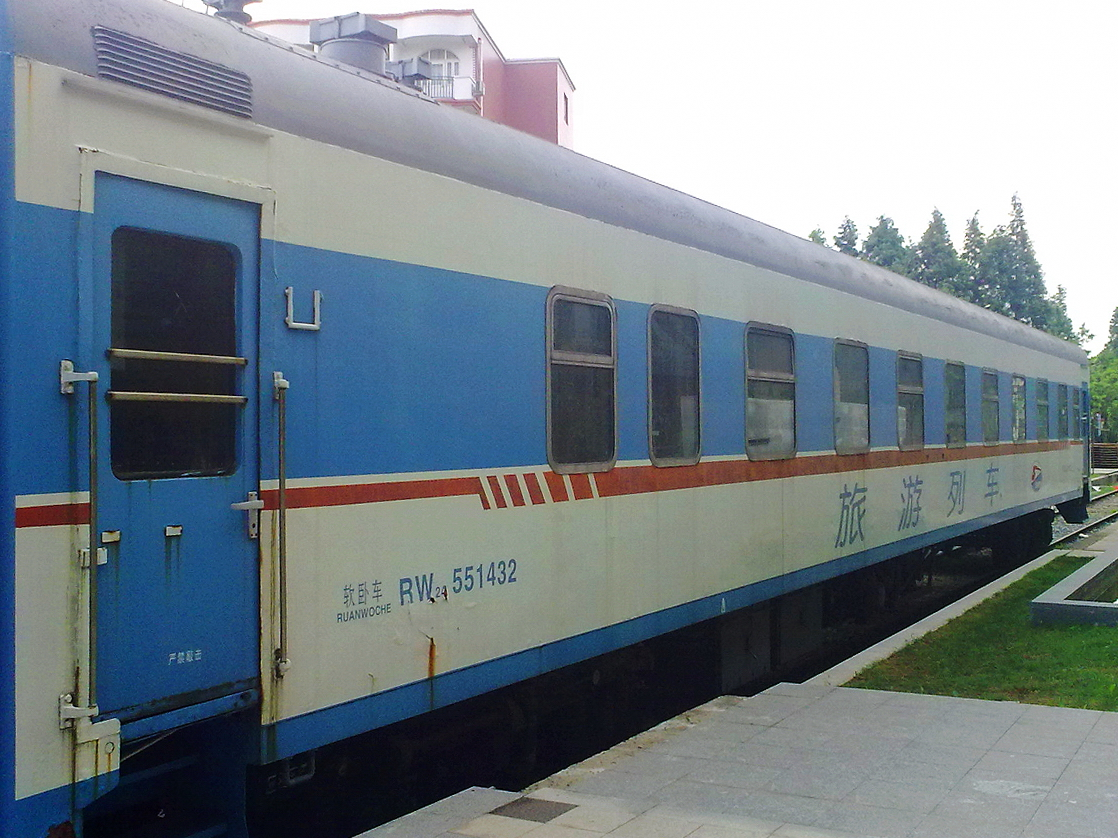
A RW24 soft seater, stored in Shanghai Jiangwan railway park, painted in the colours of a tourist car.

In 1980 and 1988 to 1989, China ordered two batches of passenger carriages from the German Democratic Republic, for a total of 372 carriages. (Note: In 1980, 110 carriages were ordered in total: 30 Type 18 (no air conditioning) and 80 Type 24 (air conditioned). There were distributed to Beijing, Shanghai, Guangzhou, Liaozhou and Chengdu bureaus.) This included soft seaters (RZ_{24}), soft sleepers (RW_{24}) and buffet cars (CA_{24}), using type 211C and 211D bogies and type 212 bogies for the buffet car. The original structural speed was 160 km/h (99 mph), but as the original disc brakes were changed for block brakes, the speed limit was reduced to 140 km/h (87 mph). The car was designed to an international train standards, with a body length of 23,950 mm (78 ft 7 in), slightly longer than the Type 22 carriages. The first batch in 1980 had additional supports, while the second batch did not. These carriages were built by Deutsche Waggonbau, at Waggonbau Bautzen, while a few soft sleepers were built at Waggonbau Görlitz, while the bogies were built by Waggonbau Ammendorf. Air conditioning was powered by a generator driven by a diesel motor underneath the carriage.

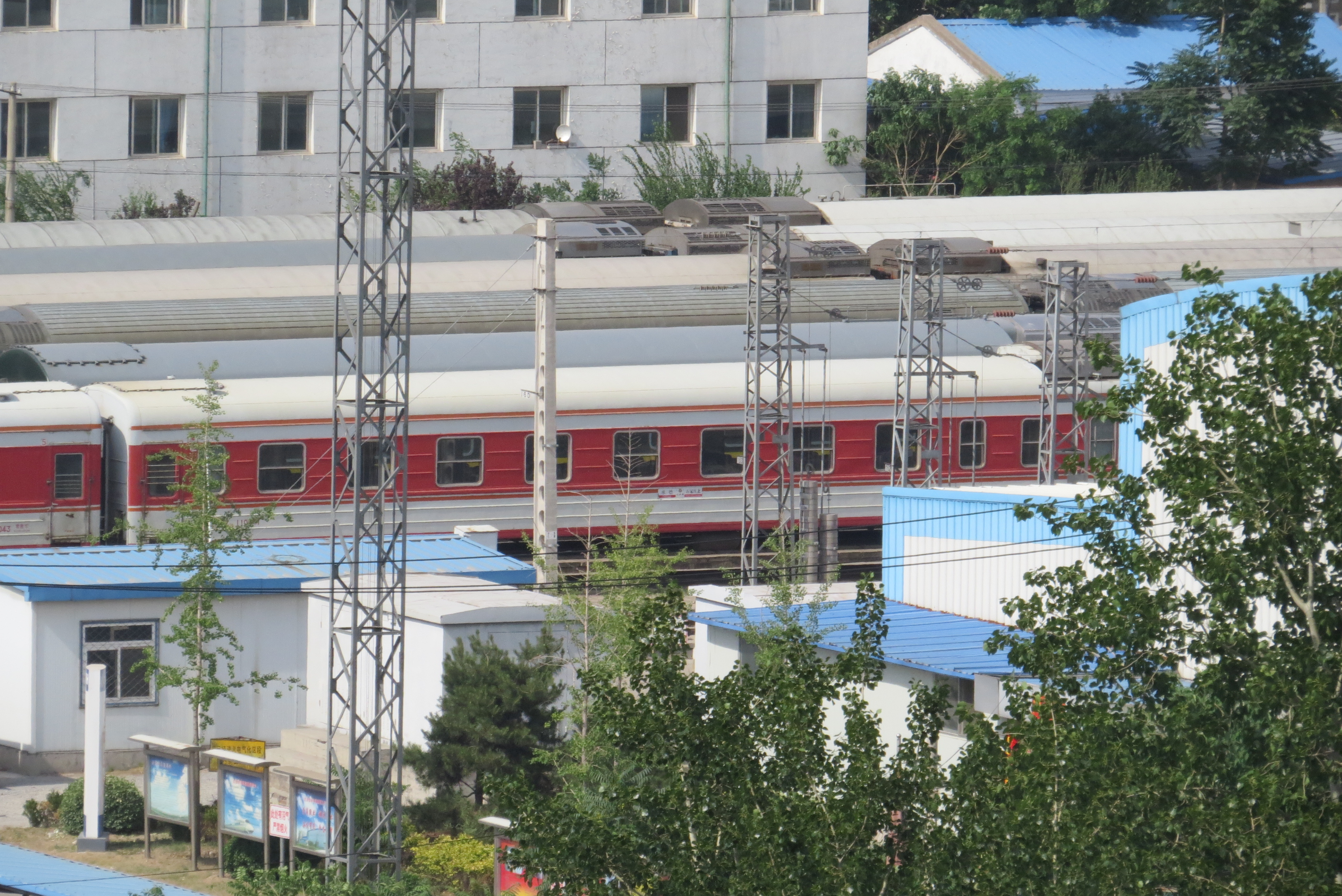
Some Type 24 carriages had their windows changed to ones similar to those on the Type 25G

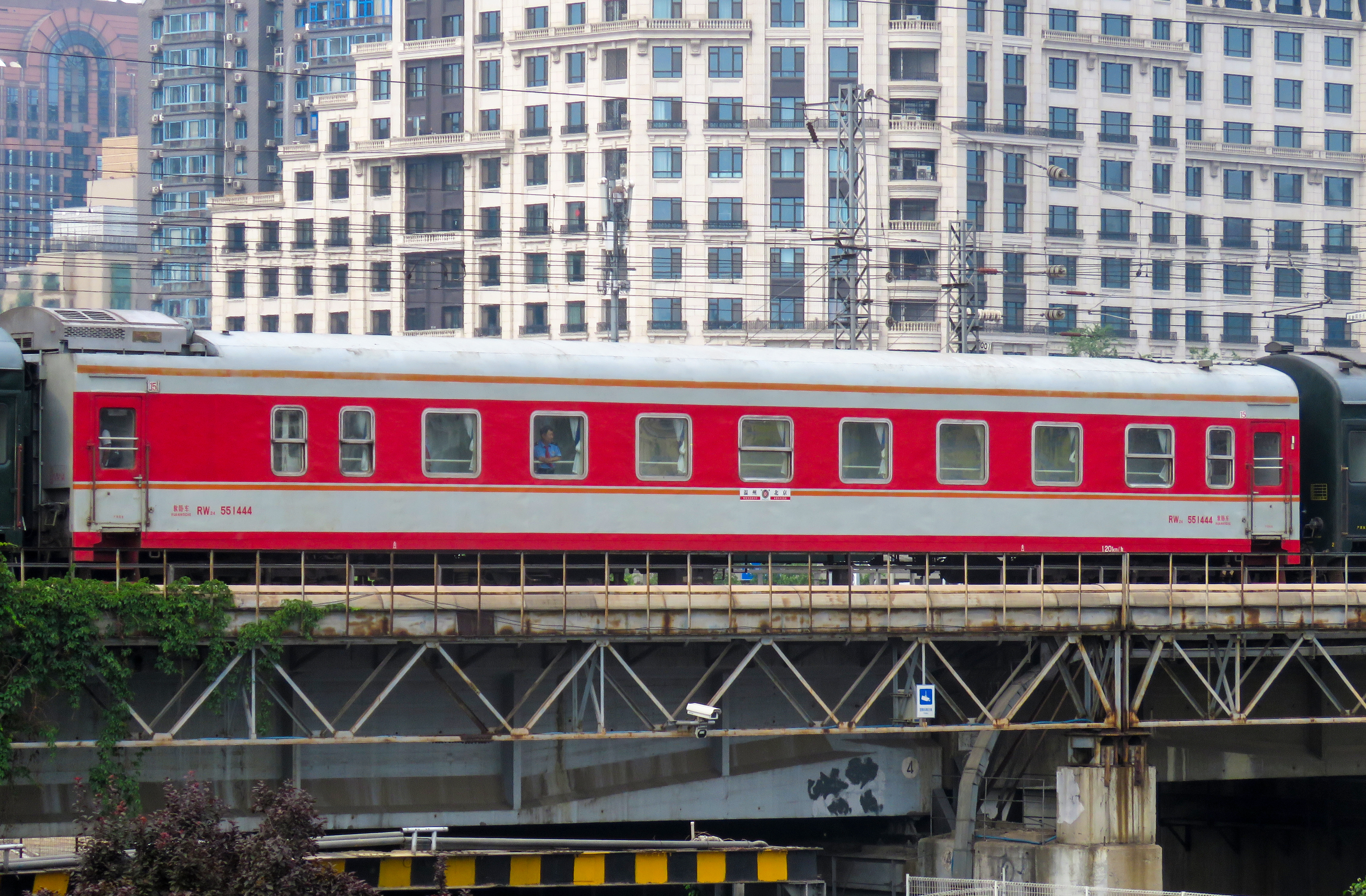
After an overhaul, some Type 24 carriages are highly similar to the 25G, and some of them are simply re-registered as 25G

Those imported Type 24 carriages were the best carriages in service with China Railway from the 1980s to the early 1990, and were painted at the time in the standard green paint. Later carriages built in China were up to a degree influenced by the East German Type 24 carriage. To have these Type 24 carriages conform to more modern standards, and to streamline maintenance by reducing the number of distinct models, they were converted to use head-end power by removing the under-car equipment, and installing new air conditioners on the roof, and allowing the cars to use AC380V. After modification, the Type 24 carriages would often be run together with 25G carriages, and some were painted in a similar livery, although those with Shanghai bureau were mostly repainted into 'tourism' car colors. Some other soft sleepers with Urumqi bureau were modified into high-end tourism carriages, running the New Orient Express from China to Kazakhstan.
