= MTR KTT =

Train set operated by the MTR

KTT - KCR Through Train Guangdong Through Train (MTR) 九廣通直通車
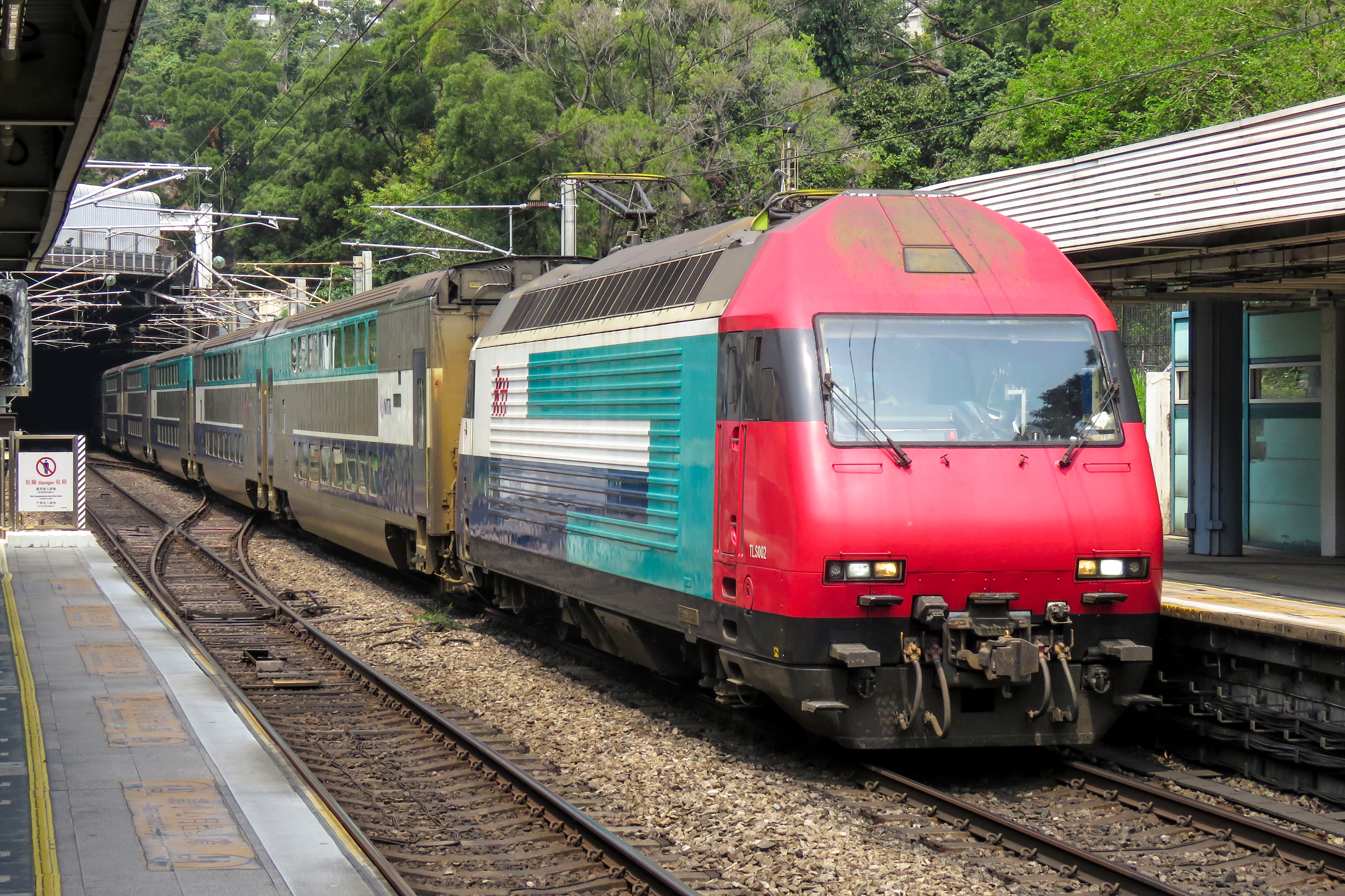
- KTT in standard livery
- In service: 28 August 1998 - 29 January 2020 (21 years, 5 months and 1 day)
- Manufacturers: SLM and ABB (locomotives); Kinki Sharyo (coaches)
- Built at: Winterthur and Zürich, Switzerland (locomotives); Osaka, Japan (coaches)
- Constructed: 1995
- Entered service: 28 August 1998
- Number built: 2 locomotives and 12 coaches
- Fleet numbers: Kowloon Through Train
- Capacity: 112 (first class car), 72 (premium class car)
- Owner: Kowloon-Canton Railway Corporation
- Operator: MTR Corporation
- Line served: MTR intercity services along East Rail line

Specifications
- Car length: 25.5 m (83 ft 8 in) (coaches); 18.5 m (60 ft 8 in) (locomotives)
- Width: 3.05 m (10 ft 0 in) (coaches); 3 m (9 ft 10 in) (locomotives)
- Height: 4.6 m (15 ft 1 in) (coaches); 4.31 m (14 ft 2 in) (locomotives)
- Floor height: 1.25 m (4 ft 1 in)
- Maximum speed: 160 km/h (99 mph) (design)
- Weight: 84 t (83 long tons; 93 short tons) (locomotives); 56 t (55 long tons; 62 short tons) (premium class coaches); 55.5 t (54.6 long tons; 61.2 short tons) (first class coaches)
- Traction system: ABB GTO–VVVF
- Traction motors: 8 × ABB 6FHA-7067 1.6–1.8 MW (2,100–2,400 hp) 3-phase AC induction motor
- Power output: 12.2 MW (16,400 hp)
- Acceleration: 1 m/s^{2} (3.3 ft/s^{2})
- Deceleration: 1 m/s^{2} (3.3 ft/s^{2}) (service); 1.3 m/s^{2} (4.3 ft/s^{2}) (emergency)
- Electric system: 25 kV 50 Hz AC Catenary
- Current collection: Pantograph
- Braking system: Air
- Safety systems: AWS (former), TBL (enhanced with ATP)
- Coupling system: Buckeye
- Track gauge: 1,435 mm (4 ft 8 1/2 in) standard gauge

KTT (simplified Chinese: 九广通; traditional Chinese: 九廣通) was a push-pull train set used by the MTR Corporation Limited in Hong Kong on the Guangdong Through Train route. It was used on the Guangdong line (Hung Hom (Kowloon), Hong Kong - Changping - Guangzhou East) of the through train service.

The double-deck "KTT" trailers have bottom floors which are lower than ordinary cars serving on the same pair of tracks.

After the Guangdong Through Train and all other intercity passenger services were suspended in early 2020 amidst the coronavirus pandemic, the KTT trains were placed into storage. On 31 July 2024, the General Administration of Customs announced that in June 2024, the State Council had approved the closure of all four railway ports of the inter-city through trains, effective from the date of notice, citing that high-speed passenger trains have effectively met the travel needs of passengers between the mainland and Hong Kong.

Since 17 January 2025, one of the Re460 locomotives and 2 of the compartments are displayed at the "Station Rail Voyage" exhibition at Hung Hom Station.

== Rolling stock ==
Builder	Model	Fleet size	Notes
SLM; ABB	SBB-CFF-FFS Re 460	2	electric locomotives numbered TLN001 and TLS002 arrived in Hong Kong on 11 May 1997
Kinki Sharyo	Premium Class T1 (T1C) and First Class T2 (T2A, T2B)	12	passenger carriages

Although the locomotive has a top speed of 200 km/h (124 mph), KTT only runs at a maximum service speed of 140 km/h (87 mph) on the Hong Kong section of the Guangzhou - Kowloon Railway and at 160 km/h (99 mph) on the Guangzhou - Shenzhen Railway. KTT now has ten compartments (eight first-class compartments and two executive-class compartments).

Since March 2018, all KTT coaches have undergone minor refurbishments. Refurbished trains feature reupholstered seats, new flooring, train automatic broadcast system devices and improved barrier-free facilities.

== See also ==
- Guangshen Railway Company Xinshisu - former service from Guangdong to Hong Kong
- LRC (train)
