= KTT =

KTT can mean:

- MTR KTT, train set of the Hong Kong MTR Corporation
- KTT Velocette racing motorcycle (1929-1949)
- Kittilä Airport, Finland, IATA code
- Kronogård Turbine Transmission
- Kruskal's Tree Theorem
