= Shigu railway station =

Railway station in Dongguan, China

Shigu railway station (Chinese: 石鼓站, formerly Shek Ku) is a railway station serving the village of Shigu in Tangxia, Dongguan, Guangdong, China. It is a station on the Guangzhou–Shenzhen railway and the Beijing–Kowloon railway, and rated level 4 on the Chinese Ministry of Railways station scale. It was opened in 1911, and is now managed by the Guangshen Railway Company.

Preceding station	China Railway	Following station
Tangtouxia towards Guangzhou	Guangzhou–Shenzhen railway	Tiantangwei towards Shenzhen
Tangtouxia towards Beijing West	Beijing–Kowloon railway	Tiantangwei towards Hung Hom
