= Guangzhou–Shenzhen railway =

Railway line in Guangdong province, China

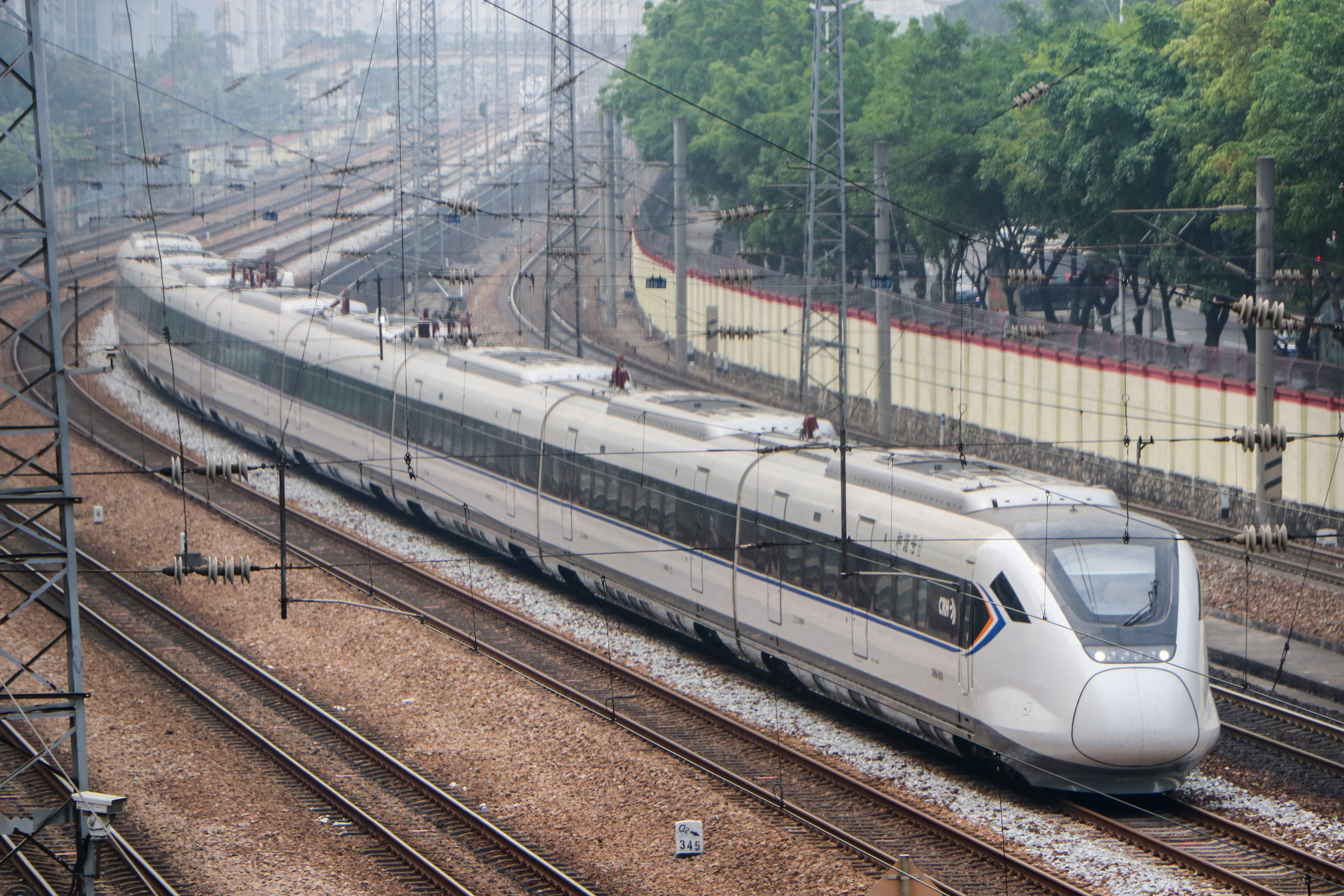
- CRH6A at Guangzhou-Shenzhen Railway in Guangzhou in March 2018

Overview
- Other name(s): Guangshen railway Kowloon–Canton railway (Chinese section)
- Native name: 广深铁路 广深线
- Status: Operational
- Owner: China Railway Guangzhou Group
- Line number: 4
- Locale: Guangdong Province: Guangzhou, Dongguan, Shenzhen
- Termini: Guangzhou; Shenzhen
- Stations: 22

Service
- Type: Higher-speed rail Heavy rail
- System: China Railway
- Operator(s): China Railway Guangzhou Group; Guangshen Railway Company
- Rolling stock: CRH1A EMU, CRH6A EMU (Regular service), CR200J (Occasionally for "Demand-relief" between Guangzhou and Shenzhen station or Shenzhen East station) CRH1A-A EMU (e.g. Guangzhou East to Xiamen EMU service), CRH1E-250 EMU (e.g. Guangzhou East to Hangzhou East EMU train service), CRH2A EMU (e.g. Nanchang West to Guangzhou East EMU train service via Shenzhen city and Dongguan), CRH380A EMU (e.g. Guangzhou East to Longyan EMU train service via Guangzhou Xintang)

History
- Opened: 8 October 1911 (114 years ago)

Technical
- Line length: 147 km (91 mi)
- Number of tracks: Quadruple-track (Guangzhou East – Shenzhen); Double-track (Guangzhou – Guangzhou East)
- Track gauge: 1,435 mm (4 ft 8 1/2 in) standard gauge
- Electrification: 25 kV 50 Hz AC (Overhead line)
- Operating speed: 200 km/h (120 mph) (tracks 1 and 2); 160 km/h (99 mph) (tracks 3 and 4)
- Signalling: Centralized CTCS Automatic closing block system (UM-70, ZPW-2000)

Guangshen Railway
- Simplified Chinese: 广深铁路
- Traditional Chinese: 廣深鐵路
Transcriptions
Standard Mandarin
- Hanyu Pinyin: Guǎngshēn Tiělù
- IPA: [kwàŋ.ʂə́n tʰjè.lû]
Yue: Cantonese
- Jyutping: gwong^{2}sam^{1} tit^{3}lou^{6}
- IPA: [kʷɔŋ˧˥.sɐm˥ tʰit̚˧.lɔw˨]

Kowloon–Canton railway, Chinese section
- Simplified Chinese: 广九铁路华段
- Traditional Chinese: 廣九鐵路華段
Transcriptions
Standard Mandarin
- Hanyu Pinyin: Guǎngjiǔ Tiělù Huáduàn
- IPA: [kwàŋ.tɕjòʊ tʰjè.lû xwǎ.twân]
Yue: Cantonese
- Jyutping: gwong^{2}gau^{2} tit^{3}lou^{6} waa^{4}dyun^{6}
- IPA: [kʷɔŋ˧˥.kɐw˧˥ tʰit̚˧.lɔw˨ wa˩.tyn˨]

Guangshen railway or Guangzhou–Shenzhen railway (Chinese: 广深铁路 or 广深线), historically known as the Chinese section of the Kowloon–Canton railway (Chinese: 广九铁路华段) in 1911–1949, is a railway in Guangdong province in the People's Republic of China, between Guangzhou and Shenzhen. It is operated by Guangshen Railway Co., Ltd., a publicly traded company.

With a length of 147 kilometres (91 mi), it was the first railway in the People's Republic of China to reach the speed of 220 km/h (137 mph) in some sections, though it is limited to about 180 km/h (112 mph) during commercial operation. Now it has four tracks between Guangzhou East and Shenzhen railway station. Line 1 and 2 are up-direction and down-direction 200 km/h (124 mph) (currently restricted to 180 km/h (112 mph) in operation) passenger lines for CRH EMU respectively, and Lines 3 and 4 are up-direction and down-direction 160 km/h (99 mph) (currently restricted to 140 km/h (87 mph) in operation) mixed passenger and freight line respectively. In order to reduce the interference to passenger trains in the daytime from lower-speed freight trains, most freight trains will be scheduled to run at night.

Guangshen railway connects with several other important railways to different directions. It links Jingguang railway and Guangmao railway in Guangzhou, Jingjiu railway in Dongguan (with which shares two regular speed track), and the East Rail line to Hong Kong at the southern end of the railway. Besides, there are some branch lines along Guangshen Railway, such as Pingyan railway to Yantian Port, Pingnan railway to Shenzhen West railway station and also the line to Huangbu Port.

Before the manifestation of COVID-19 pandemic in January 2020, traditional "Z-class" border-crossing services via the whole or part of the Guangshen Railway, serving Hong Kong and mainland destinations including Changping, Guangzhou East, Foshan and Zhaoqing, as well as to Beijing West and Shanghai, were available. However, the above-mentioned cross-border services were suspended since the on set of COVID-19 pandemic.

Starting 15 January 2023, train services between Hong Kong West Kowloon Railway Station and Guangzhou East Railway Station are available, at which Guangzhou-Shenzhen Railway is part of the route.

== History ==
The idea of constructing a railway linking Canton (now Guangzhou) and Kowloon in Hong Kong, a British crown colony germinated in the late Qing dynasty. In 1899, Britain and the Qing government agreed to construct the KCR British Section, but Britain postponed the construction as Britain was busy at the Second Boer War in Africa. In 1907, Qing government and Britain formally signed an agreement in Peking on issuing a £100-million bond as part of loan for the construction of the Chinese section of the Kowloon–Canton railway. In July 1907, construction of the British Section of the KCR began. The construction of Chinese section was delayed and only started in 1909. Under the loan contract, China needed to employ the British engineers for the construction of Chinese section, but China still employed famous Chinese railway engineer, Zhan Tianyou, as a consultant. On 8 October 1911, the Chinese section of KCR with total length of 142.77 km (88.71 mi) was opened together with the commencement of through train service between Kowloon and Guangzhou which was started to operate at the same time. The northern end of railway at that time was located in Dashatou (大沙頭), Guangzhou, which was demolished in 1951.

After the establishment of People's Republic of China in October 1949, the 'Chinese section of the Canton–Kowloon railway' was renamed 'Guangshen railway', and repairs were made to sections of the railroad damaged during the war. In 1967, railway department carried out a comprehensive maintenance on Guangshen railway to improve the transport capacity. Beginning in the 1980s economic reform policies of China, the establishment of Shenzhen Special Economic Zone and rapid economic development in the Pearl River Delta region has brought large volume of imported goods and increased passenger demand to the railway. Therefore, the second line of Guangshen Railway was constructed during 1984 to 1987 in order to meet the huge demand. Simultaneously Guangshen Railway Company (the predecessor of Guangshen Railway Company), which was directly subordinated to the Guangzhou Railway Bureau (now Guangzhou Railway Group), was established. This company was in charge of the construction projects and operational management of Guangshen Railway. In 1987, Guangshen railway became the first double-track railway in Guangdong province.

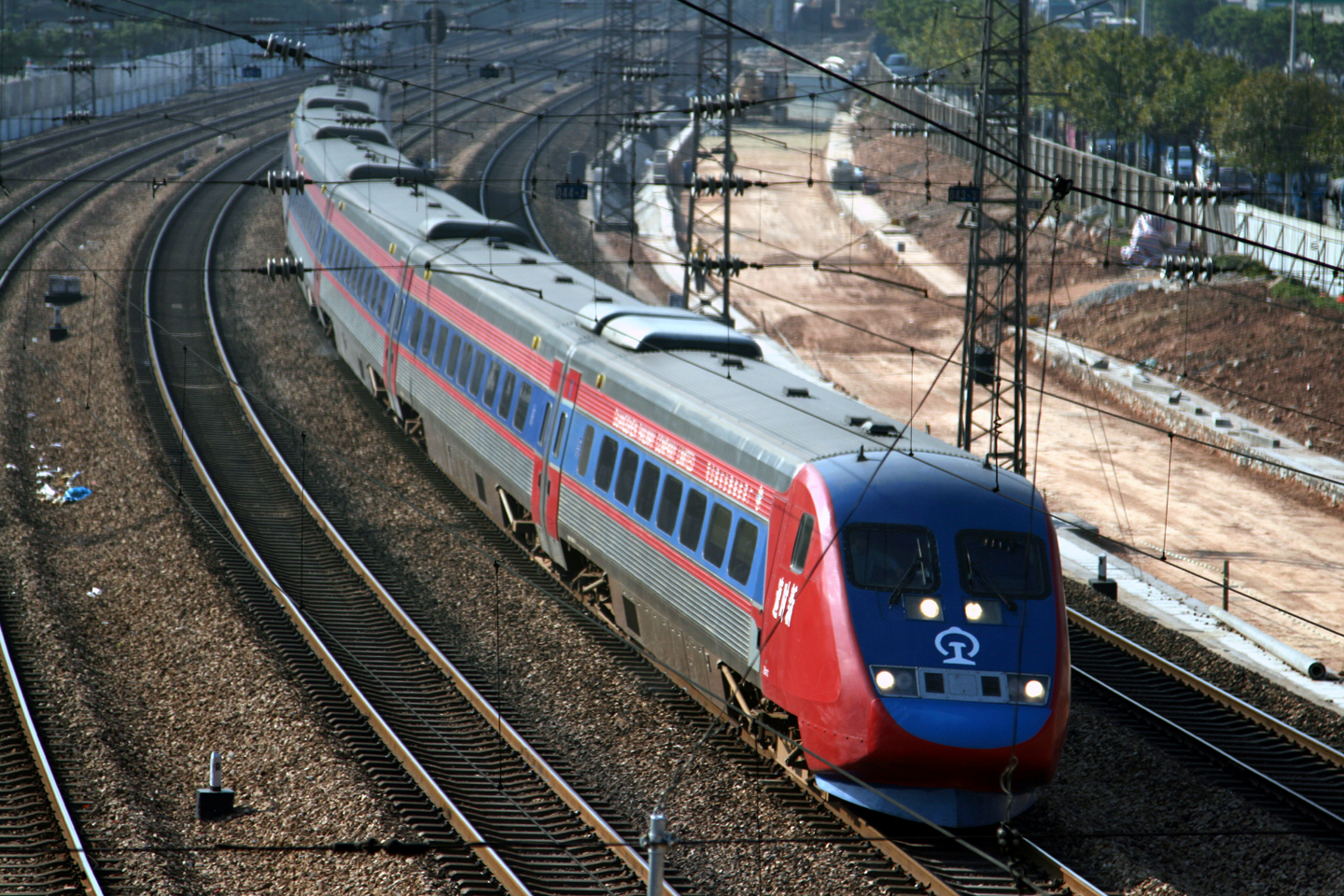
X2000 running on Guangshen railway

Guangshen railway is the first place in China to carry out successfully speed-up on the existing railroad. At the beginning of the 1990s, Guangzhou Railway Bureau and the Ministry of Railways carried out the pre-feasibility research about raising the maximum speed of passenger trains to 160 km/h (99 mph). At 28 December 1991, the construction of the third line of Guangshen railway, and the speed-up improvement works of original double tracks started. In October 1994, the maximum speed of a train reached 174 km/h (108 mph) during the test. The first sub-high speed (160 km/h (99 mph)) passenger train in China started commercial operation at 22 December 1994, operating between Guangzhou and Shenzhen.

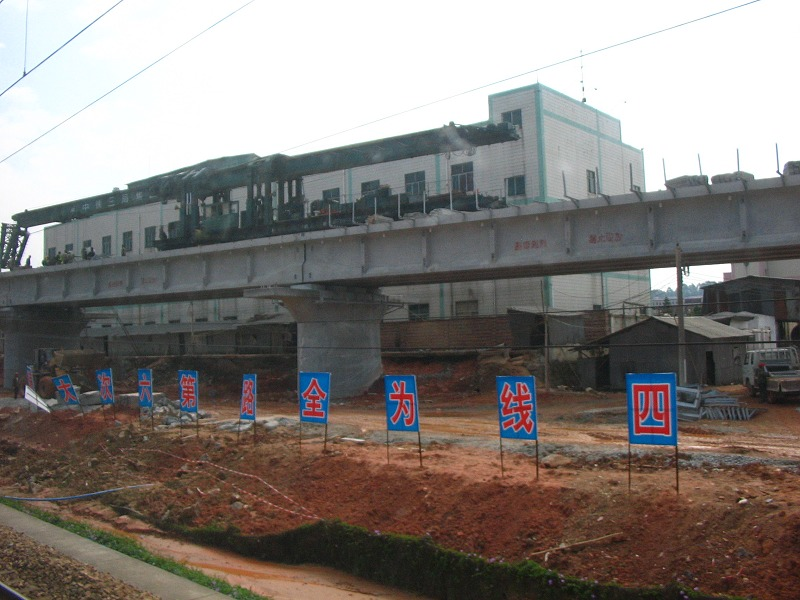
Fourth track of Guangshen railway under construction

In 1998 the electrification of two sub-high speed lines of Guangshen railway was finished. After the improvement the 200 km/h (124 mph) high speed trains are allowed to run on the existing sub-high speed railroad. A Swedish-built X 2000 tilting train called 'Xinshisu' began to serve intercity train service between Guangzhou and Shenzhen, as well as the through train to Hong Kong. The train are 165m long, consisting of a power car, five passenger cars, and a trailing car. The non-power cars can have a pitch of up to 8 degrees. They are noted for being very quiet (less than 65 dBA) even at 200 km/h (124 mph). Such Swedish X 2000 trains allowed the line to reach 200 km/h (124 mph) and 220 km/h (137 mph) in some sections of the Guangshen line.

Starting 21 October 2001, the "As-frequent-as-buses" Train Project was fully roll out using 8 sets of domestic made "Blue Arrow" trains, which were high-speed (capable to reach a speed of 210 km/h) electrical trains for express service between Guangzhou and Shenzhen.

Construction of the fourth track was commenced at 31 December 2005, and was finished at 18 April 2007 in time for the Sixth Speed-Up Campaign. Since then Guangshen railway has been the first four-track railway in mainland China and it allows passenger trains and freight trains to run on separate lines.

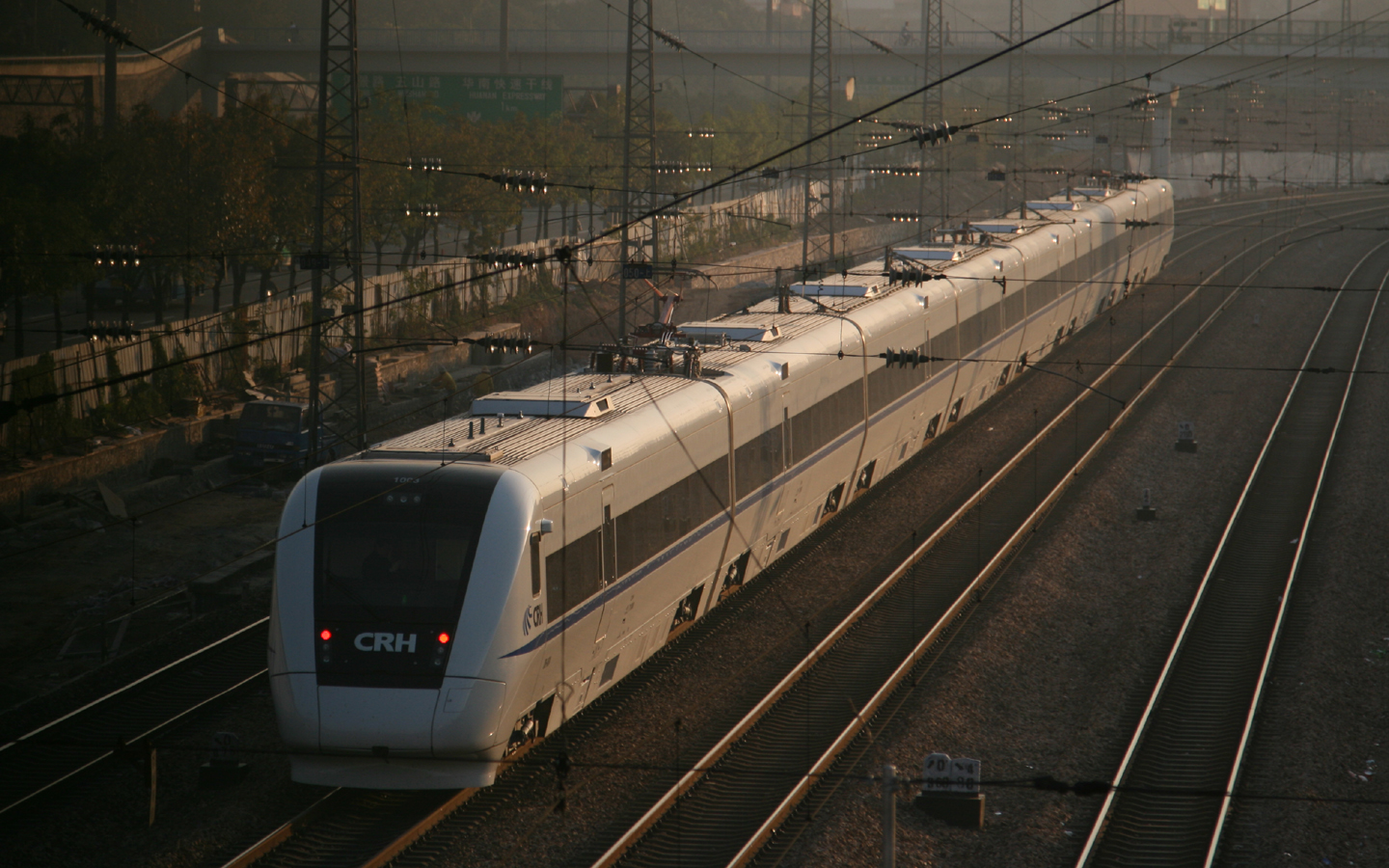
CRH1A running on Guangshen railway

8-car CRH1A highspeed EMUs have been introduced since year 2007 for the intercity train service between Guangzhou and Shenzhen, and there were 100 pairs of trains operated daily. The fastest journey time was 52 minutes between Guangzhou East and Shenzhen with no stop in-between. Train numbers D7002 and D7008 (as at year 2007) had been used for such direct service.

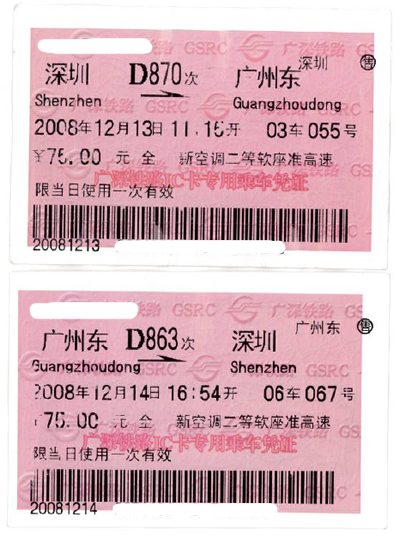
Tickets of intercity trains as of 2008

Implementation of "stop-at-all-stations" operating model started since 1 May 2009 at which intermediate stations includes Dongguan (located in Changping at that time), Shilong and Zhangmutou.

Non-stop trains serving between Guangzhou East and Shenzhen re-emerges since the early 2020s at which "C8" prefix train numbers are introduced for such service.

== Guangzhou-Shenzhen service ==
=== Regularly operating "C-prefix" trains ===
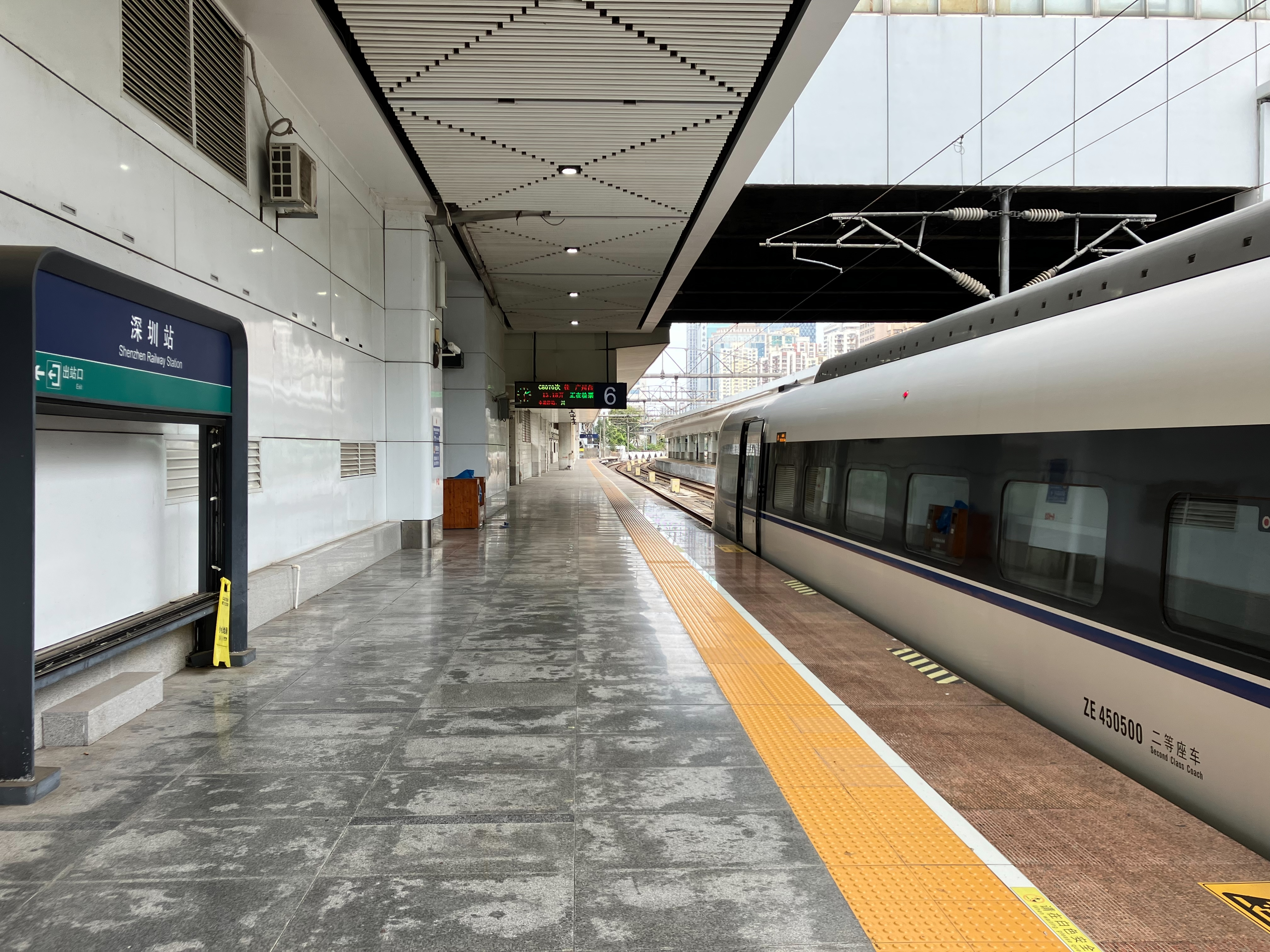
A departure using CRH6A EMU is waiting at Shenzhen railway station and heading for Guangzhou direction

Regularly operating service between Guangzhou and Shenzhen uses 8-car CRH1A EMU or CRH6A EMU. Currently train numbers with prefix "C" are in use.

According to Official customer portal of China Railway (Note: Chinese language version of official timetable has also been referred.) as at October 2024 showing all train trips between Guangzhou city and Shenzhen city, train numbers (C800x-C801x) are assigned for non-stop express trips running between Guangzhou East railway station and Shenzhen railway station.

For "C" prefix trains numbered by 4 numerical digits (7xxx or 80xx) serving Shenzhen railway station and Guangzhou city, a majority of trains serve Guangzhou East railway station at Guangzhou side, and within the Guangshen line a few number of trains serve Guangzhou railway station, mostly in a manner as an intermediate stopping before terminating at Guangzhou Baiyun railway station which is located at short distance beyond the Guangshen line.

=== "Demand-relief" trips ===
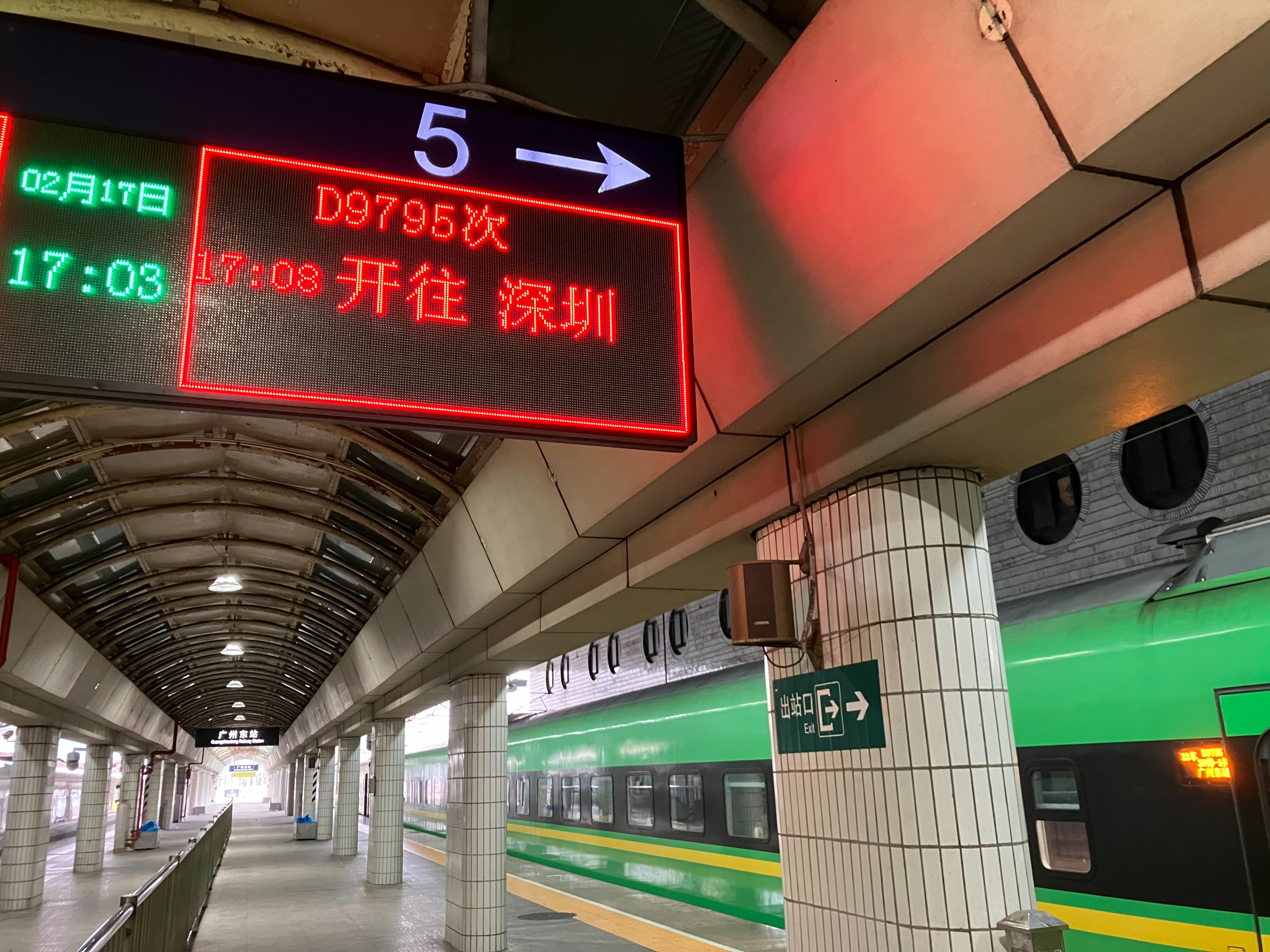
Information Display at platform of Guangzhou East railway station, showing the final destination "Shenzhen railway station" of D9795 service as at Spring 2024

Along the Guangshen line, temporally added trips for the Guangzhou-Dongguan-Shenzhen service may be numbered with prefix "Z", (Note: It was reported that "Z-class" train services between Shenzhen East and Guangzhou East, numbered Z8351-Z8356, existed temporarily in December 2019.) "C" or "D", using Shenzhen East railway station or Shenzhen railway station as the terminal station.

In addition to CRH EMUs running temporally added intercity trips typically numbered C9xxx, it is possible that CR200J "Fuxing" trains are deployed to the temporally added trips (with prefix "D" or "C") since the allocation of 4 sets of such type of "Fuxing" train to Guangshen Railway Company Limited (GSRC) at the time of year 2019 and thereafter.

The emergence of "D-class" trip using CR200J trains in Shenzhen railway station begins in December 2019 serving regular long-distance D727, D728 trains for Beijing West while this service actually runs mainly along the Beijing-Kowloon railway (Note: Chinese-language wiki article of D727/728 trains refers.) which starts its multiplexes with Guangshen line in Dongguan City, meaning that the initial manifestation of CR200J trains along Guangshen line was just confined within a limited distance.

For the use of CR200J trains travelling longer distance of GuangShen line for demand-relief purpose, one noteworthy example is, to start with, an internet media reported that a temporally added service was available on 29 and 30 September and 2, 3, 5, and 6 October 2023, mentioning a pair of train service numbered D7495, D7496 although that was a cross-line traffic between Changsha railway station and Shenzhen East railway station for demand relief.

Shorter "intercity" service between Shenzhen East railway station and Guangzhou East railway station may occur in a rare, temporally (Note: The author(s) or editor of a media report website, in Chinese, use the Chinese words「臨時」(at which the meaning equals to "temporal" in English) when reporting the Z8351-Z8354 service in December 2019. For situation in year 2024, the service period of D9785-D9786 as reported by the China Railway's official website only confined within Chunyun period.) manner while not on a regular basis. For the example in relation to the above-mentioned D7496 service in year 2023, to start with, Guangzhou Railway Group maintains several Sina Weibo accounts officially where latest information about status of available tickets up-to-date, in particular for the days within peak demand period, may be posted. Previous posts in the Guangzhou Railway Group's official Weibo channels (Note: Other than the mentioned temporary added trips in October 2023, another example occurred that information was released to the internet in a similar way (in Chinese language), is on 6 April 2024) show that service between Shenzhen East railway station and Guangzhou East railway station was provided with available ticket on-sale among at least some, if not all, of the days that the above-mentioned D7495, D7496 trips were in service in year 2023.

Examples of temporally added "D-class" service between Guangzhou city and Shenzhen city during peak-demand holidays, at which written notice has been announced via the Chinese language page of Official customer portal of China Railway beforehand, include the added service during "Spring Festival Travel Rush" (or named as "chunyun") in year 2024 numbered D9785-D9786 serving between Shenzhen East railway station and Guangzhou East railway station, and D9791-D9796 serving between Guangzhou East railway station and Shenzhen railway station.

During the holiday week of October 2024, there exists a pair of trains serving between Guangzhou East railway station and Shenzhen railway station, using train set composed by both second class seat coaches and sleeper berth configuration coaches, with train numbers C99 for southbound and C100 for northbound services of peak demand days of October 2024 according to the timetable as shown at the China Railway's official 12306 website.

=== Rolling stock ===
| Time | Rolling stocks using by Guangshen (intercity) trains |
|---|---|
| Before 1966 | SL6 steam locomotive hauling 21 Series / 22 Series railway carriages |
| 1966–mid-1970s | SL6 steam locomotive / Dongfanghong1 / DF diesel locomotive (from 1972) hauling 21 Series / 22 Series railway carriage Dongfanghong1 / DF diesel locomotive(from 1972) hauling 24 Series railway carriages with air-conditioning (91/92 Express) |
| 1970s–late 1994 | Locomotives: DF3 / ND2 / DF4B (from 1985) / DF9 diesel locomotive(from 1990s); Passenger coaches: 24 Series with air-conditioning / 25 Series / 22 Series / 22 Series railway carriages with air-conditioning |
| Late 1994–1998 | Locomotives:DF4B / DF9 / DF11 diesel locomotive Passenger coaches:22 Series / Double-deck 25B Series with air-conditioning / 25Z Series |
| 1998–2004 | DF4B diesel locomotive hauling 22 Series / Double-deck 25B Series with air-conditioning / SS8 electric locomotive / DF11 diesel locomotive hauling 25Z Series / 25C Series railway carriage DDJ1 EMU(1999–2000); Xianfenghao EMU(2001); X2000 tilting train DJJ1 EMU (Blue Arrow)(from 2001) |
| 2004–2006 | DF4B diesel locomotive hauling Double-deck 25B Series with air-conditioning / SS8 electric locomotive / DF11 diesel locomotive hauling 25Z Series / 25C Series railway carriage X2000 tilting train / DJJ1 EMU (Blue Arrow) |
| 2007– | DF11 diesel locomotive hauling 25Z Series railway carriage (Until 25 April 2007); DF4B diesel locomotive hauling Double-deck 25B Series with air-conditioning (Until 30 June 2007); DJJ1 EMU (Blue Arrow) (Until 25 April 2007); CRH1A EMU (from 1 February 2007); CRH6A EMU (from year 2018); CR200J |

== Stations ==
=== Stations with services ===
Most of the existing stations on the line are abandoned for passenger service, while reopening of a previously abandoned station after reconstruction or refurbishment can occur. Examples include Pinghu in year 2016 and Xintang (later renamed to Guangzhou Xintang) in year 2023 (Note: Guangzhou-Shanwei High-speed Railway started operation since 26 September 2023 at which trains running via III、IV line of Guangshen railway to serve between Xintang and Guangzhou East Station become available; for intercity service with Shenzhen via Dongguan, service become available since year 2024).

As at year 2024, major stations on the line offering passengers service are, in order:

| Station No. | Station Name | Chinese | Distance km | | PRD MIR (CR C-train) transfers/connections | Metro transfers/connections | Location | |
|---|---|---|---|---|---|---|---|---|
| GZQ | Guangzhou | 广州 | 0 | 0 | | 2 5 11 14 22 | Yuexiu | Guangzhou |
| GGQ | Guangzhou East; Guangzhoudong | 广州东 | 8 | 8 | SS * | 1 3 11 18 | Tianhe | Guangzhou |
| XWQ | Guangzhou Xintang | 广州新塘 | 31 | 39 | | 13 | Zengcheng | Guangzhou |
| RTQ | Dongguan | 东莞 | 33 | 72 | | 2 | Shilong | Dongguan |
| DAQ | Changping | 常平 | 18 | 90 | | | Changping | Dongguan |
| ZOQ | Zhangmutou | 樟木头 | 13 | 103 | | | Zhangmutou | Dongguan |
| PHQ | Pinghu | 平湖 | 24 | 127 | | 10 | Longgang | Shenzhen |
| BJQ | Shenzhen East; Shenzhendong | 深圳东 | 12 | 139 | | 3 5 14 | Longgang | Shenzhen |
| SZQ | Shenzhen | 深圳 | 8 | 147 | | 1 via Luohu; 9 via Renmin South; East Rail line via Lo Wu | Luohu | Shenzhen |

=== All existing stations ===
Existing stations
| China Railway High-speed | China Railway | Station Name; English | Station Name; Chinese | Total; Distance | Transfer | Location | Grade | Notes |
| ● | ● | Guangzhou | 广州 | 0 | 2 5 11 14 22 | Yuexiu, Guangzhou | T (Note: Top class; Chinese: 特等站) | Stop station for a few number Guangzhou – Shenzhen trains (CRH) |
| ｜ | ｜ | ~~Yunlu~~ | 云麓 | 4 | | Yuexiu, Guangzhou | 4 | Not for passenger service. Decommissioned in 2009. |
| ● | ● | Guangzhou East | 广州东 | 8 | 1 3 11 18 | Tianhe, Guangzhou | 1 | The major stop and departure station for Guangzhou–Shenzhen trains (CRH) |
| ｜ | ● | Shipai | 石牌 | 14 | | Tianhe, Guangzhou | 4 | Not for passenger service. |
| ｜ | ｜ | Huangpu | 黄埔 | 18 | | Tianhe, Guangzhou | 2 | Not for passenger service. |
| ｜ | ｜ | ~~Jiuyunhui~~ | 九运会 | | | Tianhe, Guangzhou | | Decommissioned in 2002. |
| ｜ | ● | Jishan | 吉山 | 20 | | Tianhe, Guangzhou | 3 | Not for passenger service. |
| ● | ● | Xiayuan | 下元 | 27 | | Huangpu, Guangzhou | 3 | Not for passenger service. |
| ｜ | ｜ | ~~Nangang~~ | 南岗 | 32 | | Huangpu, Guangzhou | 4 | Decommissioned in 2009. |
| ● | ● | Guangzhou Xintang | 广州新塘 | 39 | 13 | Zengcheng, Guangzhou | 4 | Reopened in 2023 with Guangzhou-Shenzhen passenger service commences since year 2024. Stopping station for some Guangzhou–Shenzhen intercity trains (CRH) |
| ｜ | ｜ | ~~Shapu~~ | 沙浦 | 45 | | Zengcheng, Guangzhou | 5 | Decommissioned in 2007. |
| ｜ | ｜ | ~~Tangmei~~ | 塘美 | | | Zengcheng, Guangzhou | 4 | Decommissioned in 2007. |
| ● | ● | Xiancun | 仙村 | 51 | | Zengcheng, Guangzhou | 4 | Not for passenger service. |
| ｜ | ｜ | ~~Shitan~~ | 石滩 | 60 | | Zengcheng, Guangzhou | 4 | Decommissioned in 2009. |
| ｜ | ｜ | ~~Honghai~~ | 红海 | 64 | | Zengcheng, Guangzhou | 4 | Not for passenger service. Decommissioned in 2006. |
| ｜ | ｜ | ~~Shilong~~ | 石龙 | 69 | | Shilong, Dongguan | 3 | Decommissioned in 2014. |
| ● | ● | Dongguan | 东莞 | 72 | 2 | Shilong, Dongguan | 2 | Stopping station for Guangzhou–Shenzhen trains (CRH) |
| ｜ | ● | Chashan | 茶山 | 75 | | Chashan, Dongguan | 4 | Not for passenger service. |
| ｜ | ｜ | ~~Nanshe~~ | 南社 | 78 | | Chashan, Dongguan | 4 | Decommissioned in 2007. |
| ｜ | ｜ | ~~Hengli~~ | 横沥 | 84 | | Hengli, Dongguan | 4 | Decommissioned in 2009. |
| ● | ● | Changping | 常平 | 90 | | Changping, Dongguan | 2 | Stopping station for Guangzhou–Shenzhen trains (CRH) |
| ｜ | ｜ | ~~Tutang~~ | 土塘 | 94 | | Changping, Dongguan | 5 | Decommissioned |
| ● | ● | Zhangmutou | 樟木头 | 103 | | Zhangmutou, Dongguan | 3 | Stopping station for Guangzhou–Shenzhen trains (CRH) |
| ｜ | ｜ | ~~Lincun~~ | 林村 | | | Tangxia, Dongguan | 4 | Decommissioned in 2010. |
| ● | ● | Tangtouxia | 塘头厦 | 114 | | Tangxia, Dongguan | 4 | Not for passenger service. |
| ｜ | ｜ | ~~Shigu~~ | 石鼓 | 119 | | Tangxia, Dongguan | 4 | Decommissioned in 2007. |
| ｜ | ｜ | ~~Tiantangwei~~ | 天堂围 | 122 | | Fenggang, Dongguan | 4 | Decommissioned in 2007. |
| ● | ● | Pinghu | 平湖 | 127 | 10 | Longgang, Shenzhen | 4 | Stopping station for some Guangzhou–Shenzhen intercity trains (CRH) |
| ｜ | ● | Pinghu South | 平湖南 | 131 | | Longgang, Shenzhen | | Not for passenger service. |
| ｜ | ｜ | ~~Lilang~~ | 李朗 | | | Longgang, Shenzhen | 4 | Decommissioned in 2007. |
| ● | ● | Shenzhen East | 深圳东 | 139 | 35 | Longgang, Shenzhen | 3 | Departure station for some non-high-speed trains. Regular CRH trains normally DO NOT stop here. In very limited occasions, or for demand-relief purpose, mostly at those "ultimately most busiest" dates during peak demand periods (Note: There exist examples to support the description.) some intercity trains (160 km/hour speed maximum) may, although rarely, depart or terminate here. |
| ● | ● | Sungang | 笋岗 | 144 | | Luohu, Shenzhen | 1 | Not for passenger service. |
| ● | ● | Shenzhen | 深圳 | 147 | 1 9 | Luohu, Shenzhen | 1 | The departure station for regular service trains (CRH) |
↓ Through-service to/from Hung Hom (Kowloon) via East Rail line ↓

== Cross-Line Traffic ==
=== Service connecting with Guangzhou Baiyun Railway Station ===
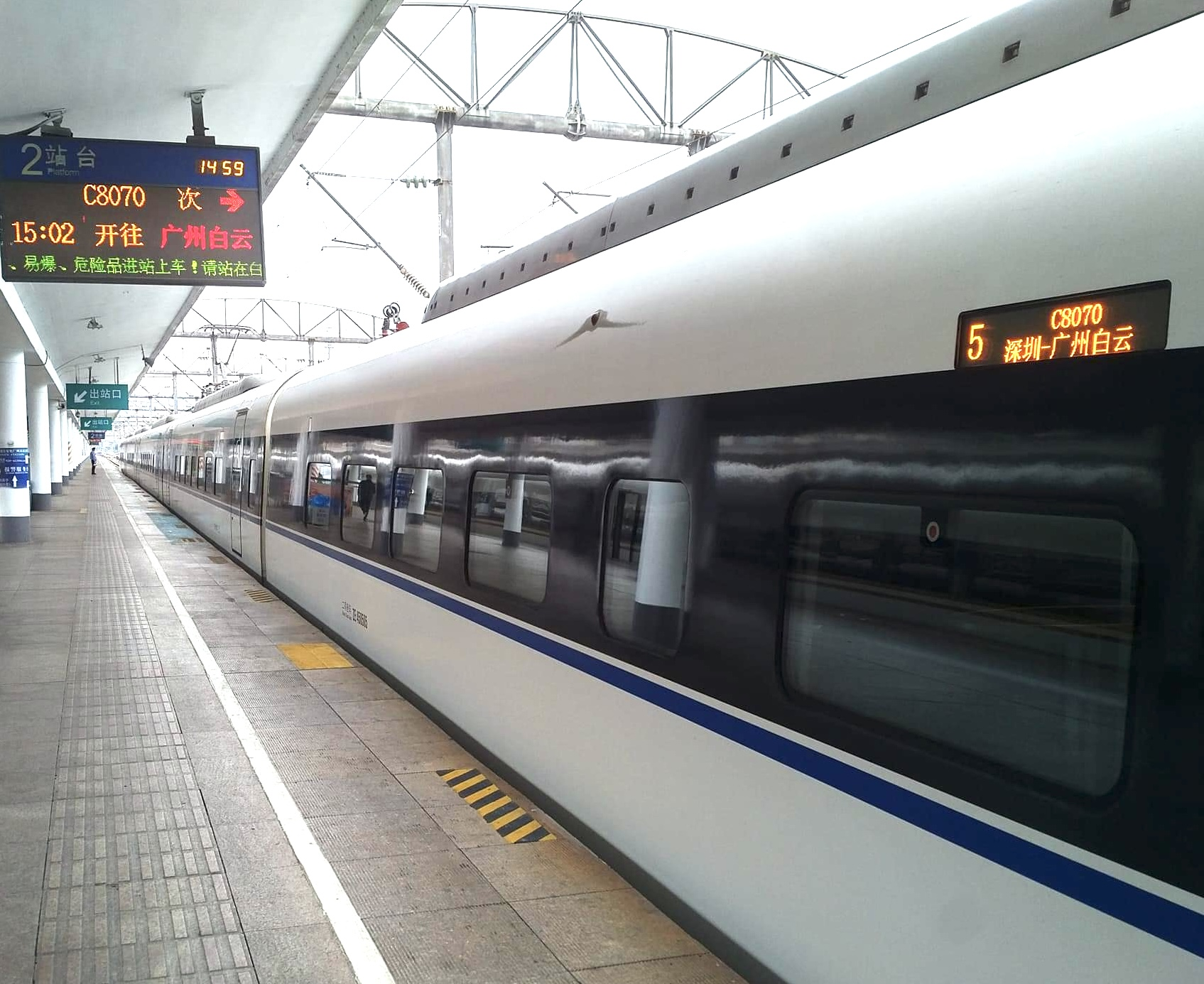
A regular departure stopping at Guangzhou Station, heading for Guangzhou Baiyun Railway Station

As mentioned in the Stations list in the "Stations" section in above, a few number of departures, using CRH trains, provide service to Guangzhou railway station. Starting year 2024, the coverage of above-mentioned service is further extended to Guangzhou Baiyun Railway Station as the terminal station, located some 5 kilometres distance beyond the Guang-shen line.

=== Service heading to Shenzhen North Railway Station direction ===
Starting 20 June 2022, service between Guangzhou East station and Shenzhen North station is available.

Service extension to cover Guangzhou Baiyun railway station and Futian railway station in Shenzhen starts from 15 June 2024, in addition to the existing trains serving between Guangzhou East and Futian stations that already exist during June 2024.

These services use Guangzhou–Shenzhen railway as part of the route.

=== Service heading to Hong Kong West Kowloon Railway Station ===
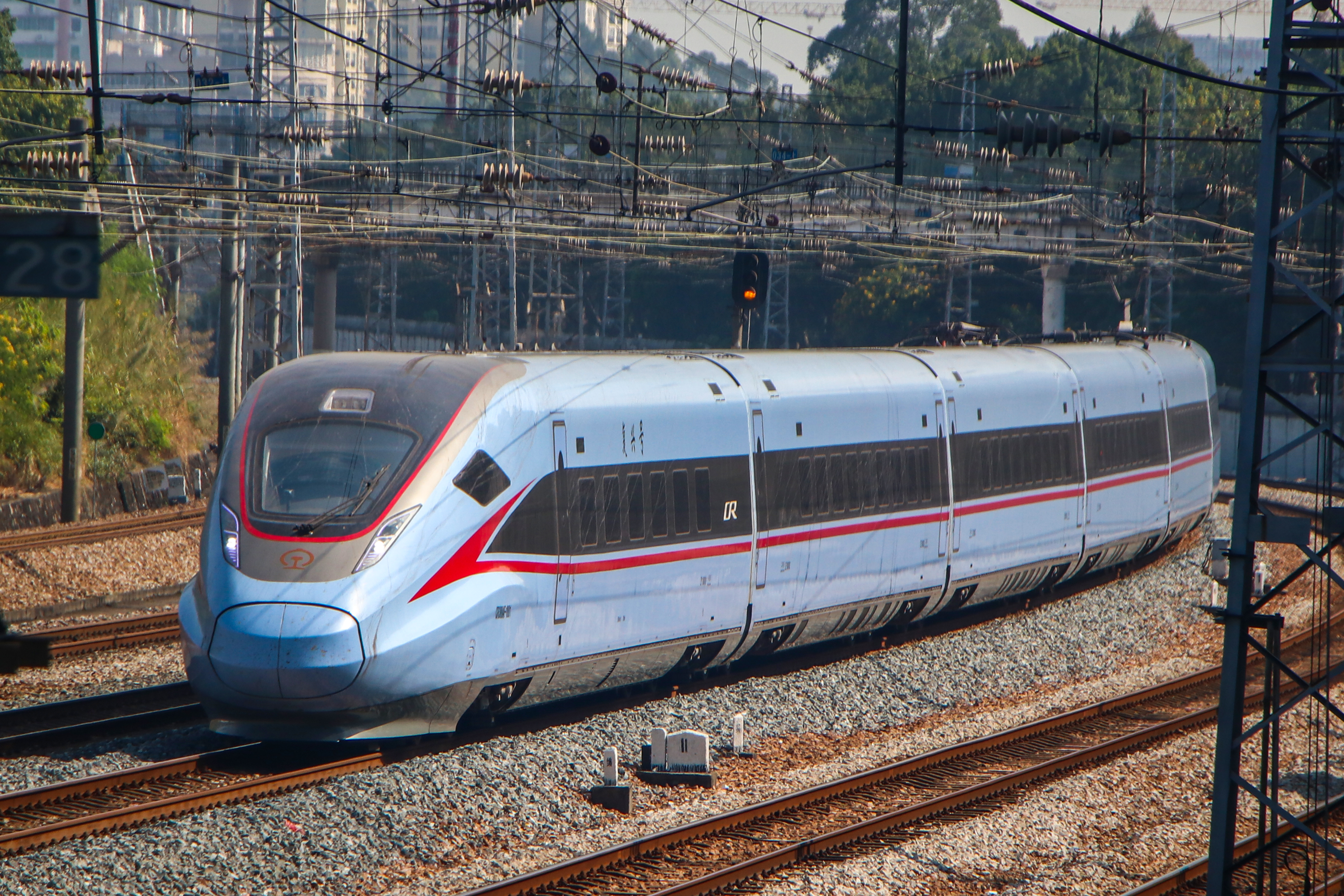
CR300AF train heading for Hong Kong West Kowloon railway station

This service uses Guangzhou–Shenzhen railway and Ganzhou-Shenzhen High-speed railway to Shenzhen North direction and provides service between Guangzhou East railway station and Hong Kong West Kowloon Railway Station.

=== Service heading to other mainland cities ===
For traffic heading to other cities, there are services of EMUs using Guangzhou–Shenzhen railway as part of the route.

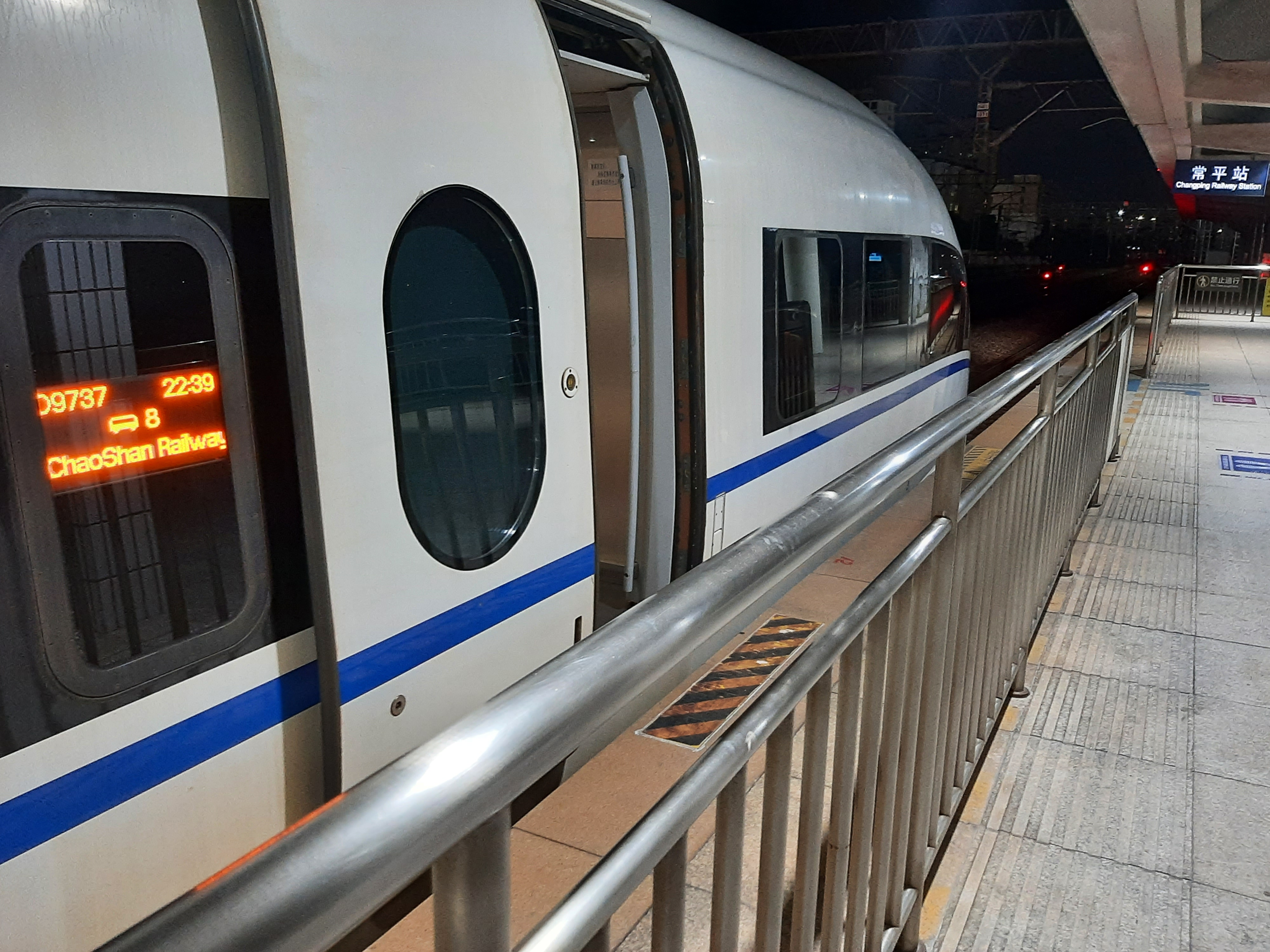
Cross-line traffic stopping at Changping (in Chinese:常平) Station after the CTCS upgrade

The completion of upgrading work in year 2020 makes the whole Guangshen line to be compatible with CTCS-2, as a result more EMUs from nationwide railway network can enter Guangshen line, and use Shenzhen railway station, Guangzhou East railway station or Guangzhou railway station as terminal station. Thus, more cross-line traffic and also more variety of types of EMUs becomes available along the Guangzhou–Shenzhen railway.

On the otherhand, the construction of the Guangzhou-Zhanjiang High-speed Railway results in a disruption of some of the cross-line traffic, at which starting from 11 October 2023 trains of China Railway running at or running for Foshan city will not enter to nor leave from the Guangzhou Railway Station.

==== Service heading towards Chaoshan or Fujian direction ====
Cross-line traffic serving Chaoshan railway station is available daily, at both Guangzhou East railway station, or Shenzhen railway station near the Luohu border with Hong Kong. Some of those trains serve Shantou also.

===== Service between Shenzhen and Chaoshan direction =====
Starting 11 October 2023, train service between Shenzhen railway station and Chaoshan railway station is introduced.

Since December 2023, service running by G-prefix train trips between Shenzhen railway station and Shantou South railway station become available.

Starting 15 June 2024, service between Shantou railway station and Shenzhen railway station, near the Luohu border with Hong Kong, become available; and these C-prefix train number trips or D-prefix train number trips are operating daily in a regular basis.

===== Service between Guangzhou and Chaoshan or Fujian direction =====
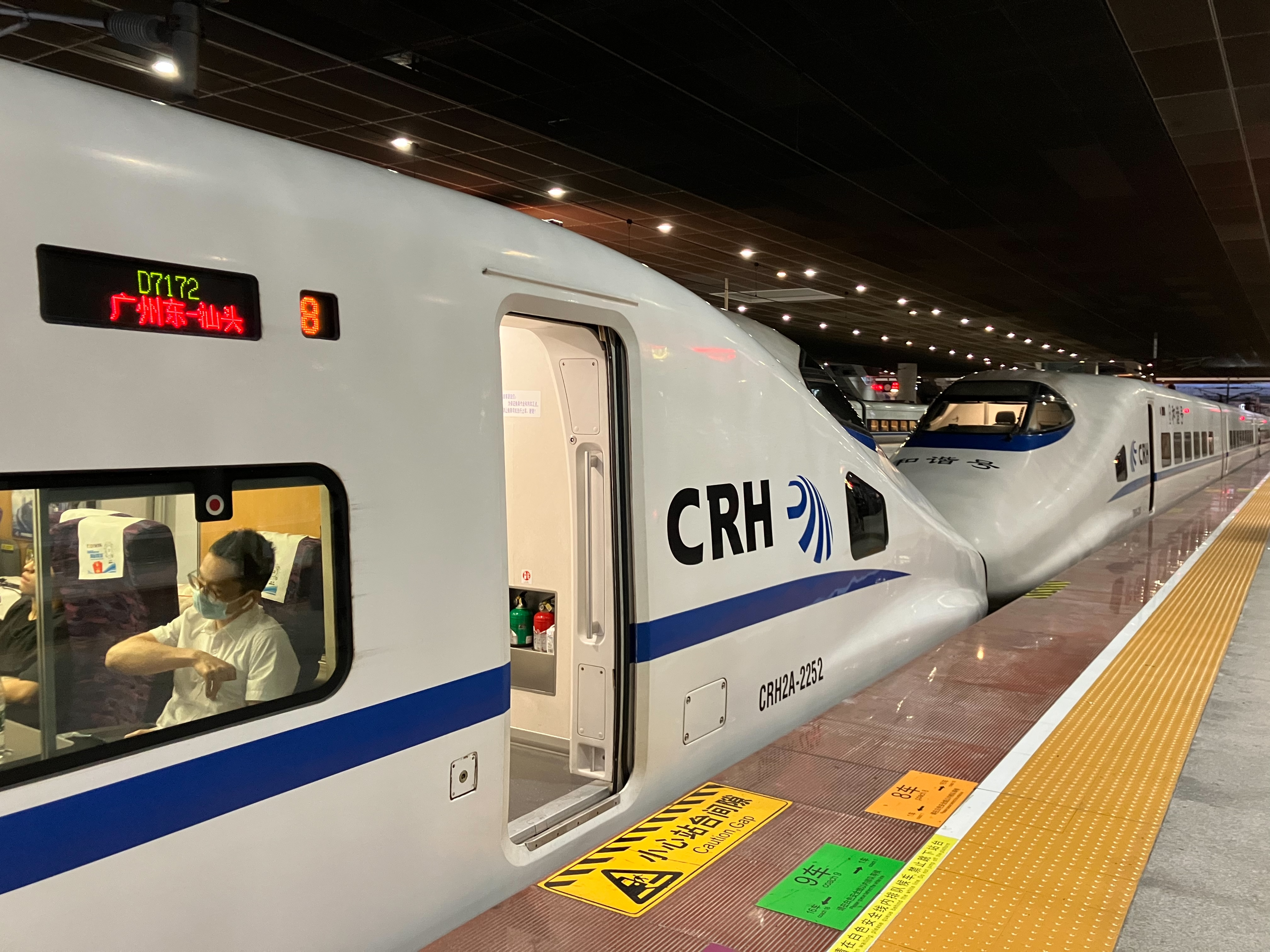
Guangzhou East to Shantou service

Daily trains are offered between Guangzhou East Railway Station and Chaoshan Railway Station, a few of them will continue to Shantou Railway Station; in addition, starting from 1 July 2018, one departure serving the Guangzhou East to Chaoshan service will continue to Xiamen.

Since not later than 26 June 2021, more EMU trains are available for service between Xiamen (or Xiamen North Station) and Guangzhou city, at which two of them (using Xiamen North Station at the time of writing in June 2023) will continue to Nanning East Station. CRH2A EMU trains are in use for service between Xiamen North and Nanning. However, with effective from 11 October 2023 the above-mentioned trains, in particular those formerly serving between Fujian and Guangxi province via Guangzhou, are shorten to serve only between Fujian province and Guangzhou city.

Starting January 2024, service using CRH380A EMU running between Guangzhou East railway station and Longyan railway station becomes available.

==== Service heading towards Zhejiang or Jiangsu Province direction ====
Starting 11 October 2022, a pair of EMU train service between Guangzhou East railway station and Hangzhou East railway station numbered D3121/4 and D3122/3 with a stop at Shenzhen North railway station becomes available that CRH1E trains are in use.

==== Service heading towards Ganzhou direction ====
Train departures are available between Guangzhou East station and Ganzhou West railway station.

Between 15 January 2022 to 9 January 2024, a pair of departures is available using CRH380A EMU trains, at which train G2775/G2778 departs from Guangzhou East station exists, and train G2777/G2776 departs from Ganzhou West station, as at June 2023 this service serves Dongguan railway station as well; in addition, another pair for the Guangzhou East to Ganzhou West service was added since 11 October 2022, with train number D1695/D1698 and D1697/D1696, at which CRH1E-250 train is in use as at June 2023.

Starting from 10 January 2024, the above-mentioned service was suspended, and the newly added service for cross-line traffic between Guangzhou East station and Ganzhou West railway station heading to JiangXi Province direction takes Guangzhou–Shanwei HSR to Ganzhou–Shenzhen HSR instead thus the new service no longer serves Dongguan railway station.

==== Service heading west from Guangzhou ====
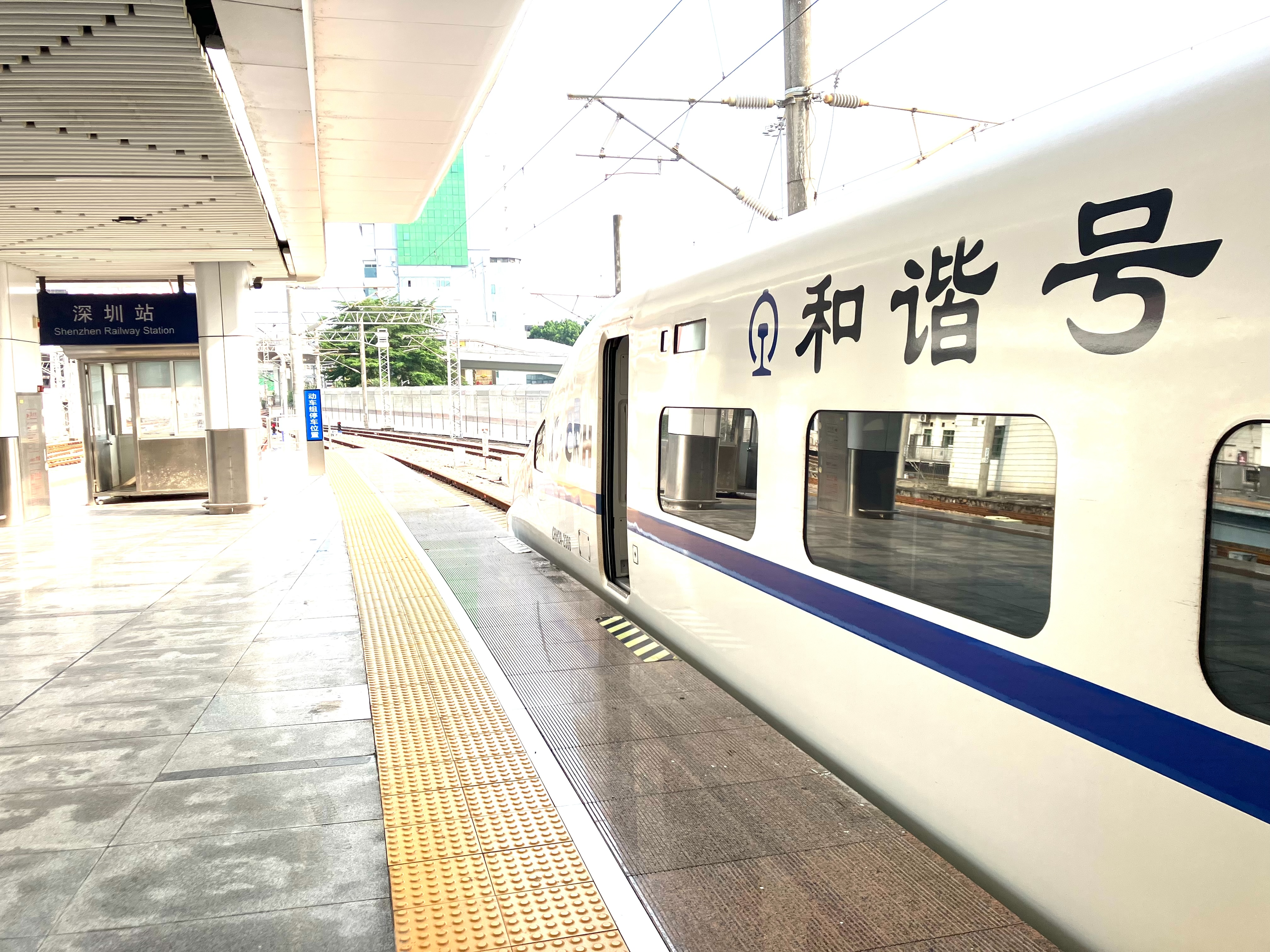
In year 2023, and before 11 October 2023, China Railway Nanning Group's CRH2A EMU train served Shenzhen Station (by running the train number D3666 from Shenzhen to Liuzhou at that moment)

A disruption of this cross-line traffic, starting 11 October 2023, occurs because of the route adjustment of Guangzhou-Sanshui section of the Guangzhou-Maoming railway to facilitate the construction of the Guangzhou-Zhanjiang High-speed Railway.

Starting 10 July 2019 to 10 October 2023, there was a daily service between Shenzhen Railway Station and Huaiji Railway Station on Guiyang-Guangzhou HSR, which is the first utilizing the whole Guangzhou-Shenzhen line in full as part of the route; starting 1 July 2020 to 10 October 2023, daily service between Shenzhen Railway Station and Foshan West Railway Station was available; however, according to the new railway timetable effective from 11 October 2023, these direct train services no longer exist.

China Railway Nanning Group's EMU trains running on the whole Guangzhou-Shenzhen line used to be exist that, since not later than year 2023 such EMU train service was previously available between Shenzhen railway station (the one in Luohu district near the Hong Kong border) and Liuzhou via Guangzhou, at which this pair of service was numbered D3665 (southbound) and D3666 (northbound); however, with effective from 11 October 2023, train number D3665/D3666 no longer serves Shenzhen and Dongguan, and this pair of train serves Zhuhai and Zhongshan instead.

== Image gallery ==
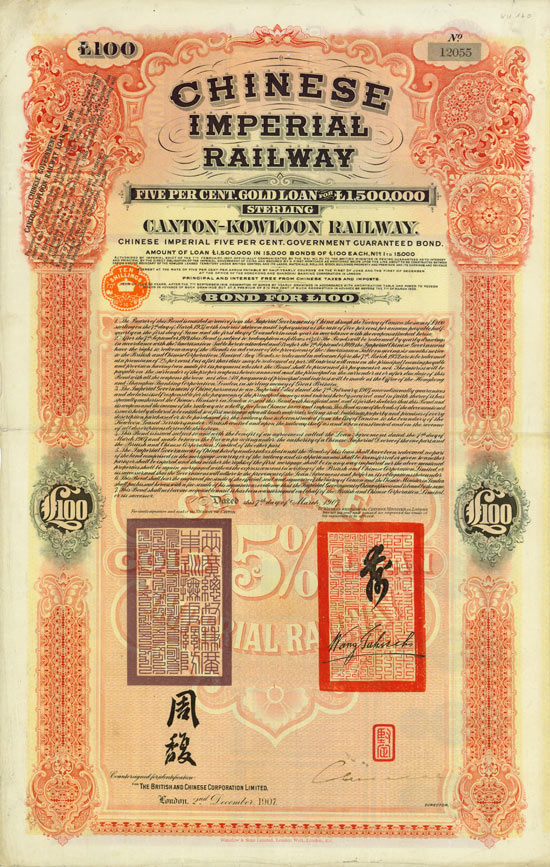
Bond agreement signed in 1907

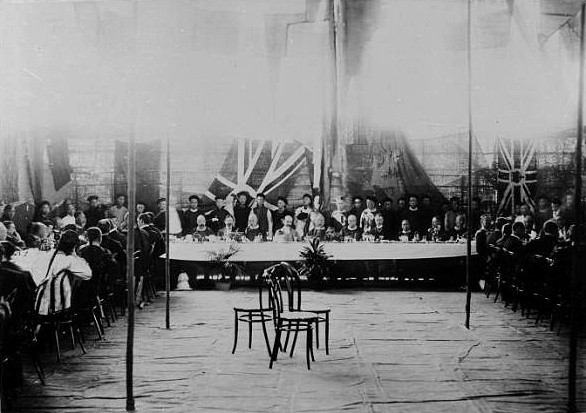
Foundation ceremony of the Chinese Section of KCR in 1909. Group photo of both Chinese and British officials.

== See also ==
- China Railway
- List of railway lines in China
- Rail transport in China
- Kowloon–Canton Railway
- Beijing-Kowloon Railway
- Guangzhou–Shenzhen–Hong Kong Express Rail Link
- Guangzhou–Shanwei high-speed railway
