= Shitan railway station =

Railway station in Guangzhou, China

Coordinates: 23.1728°N 113.7801°E

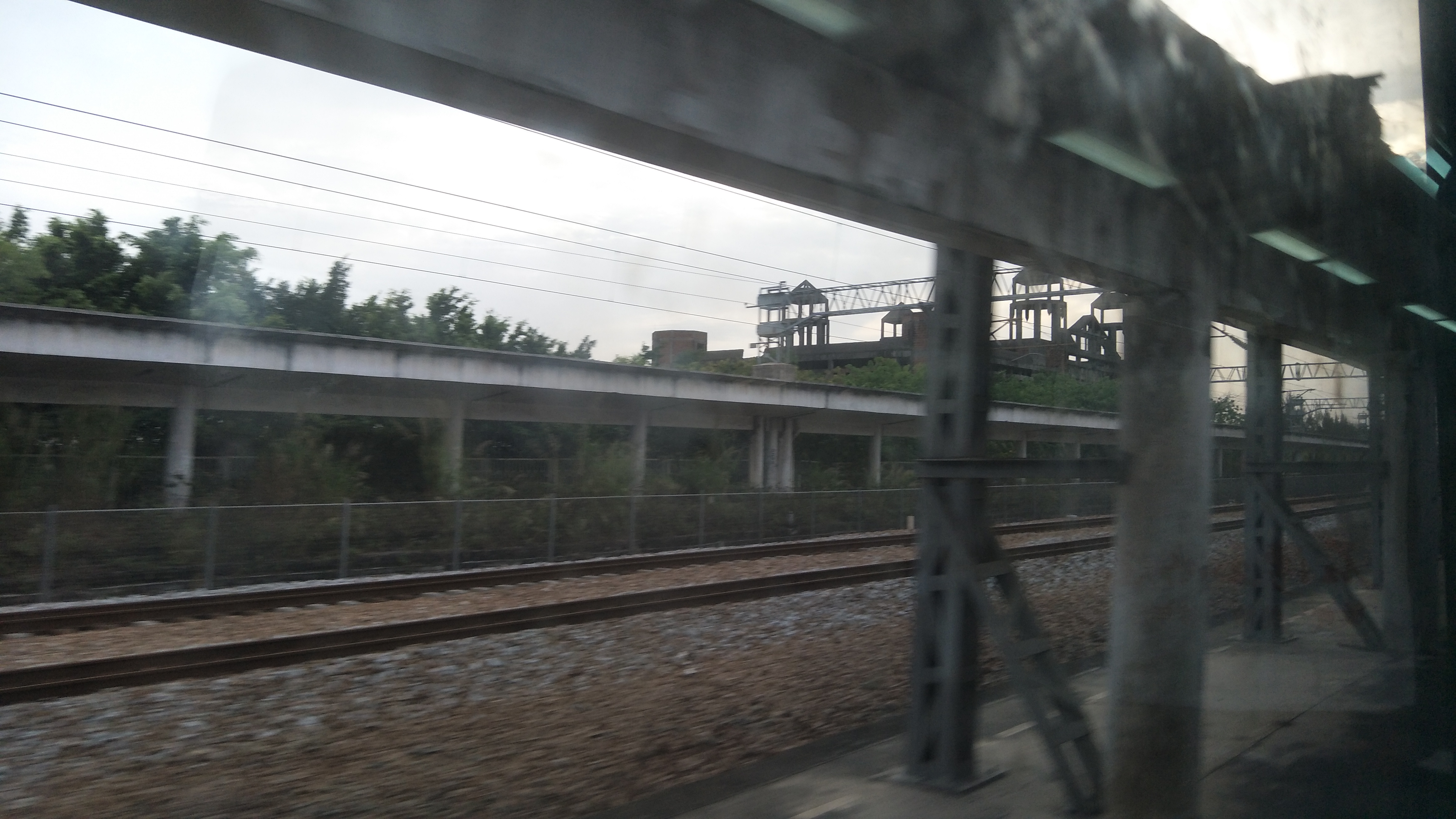
Shitan railway station

Shitan railway station (simplified Chinese: 石滩站; traditional Chinese: 石灘站; pinyin: Shítān Zhàn, formerly Shek Tan) is a railway station in Shitan, Zengcheng District, Guangzhou, Guangdong, China. It is a station on the Guangshen Railway. It is managed by the Guangshen Railway Company. It was built in 1911 and is now a level 4 station on the national railway station scale."China Railway Map — Train & Rail Network | RailsMaps"

Preceding station	China Railway	Following station
Xiancun towards Guangzhou	Guangzhou–Shenzhen railway	Shilong towards Shenzhen
