= Tangtouxia railway station =

Railway station in Dongguan, China

Coordinates: 22°47′50″N 114°05′50″E

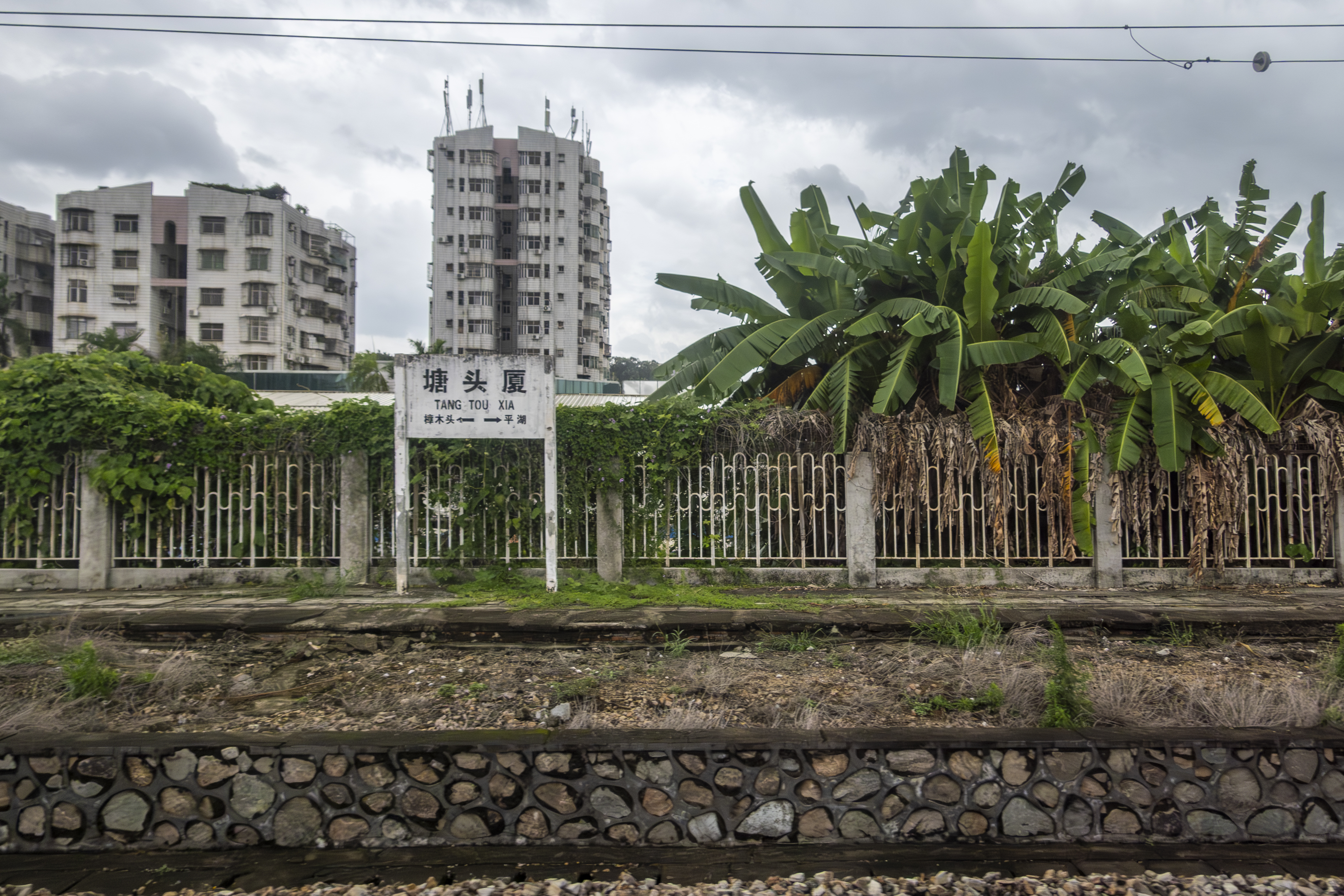
Tangtouxia railway station

Tangtouxia railway station (Chinese: 塘头厦站, formerly Tong Tau Ha) is located in Tangxia, Dongguan, Guangdong province, People's Republic of China. It is a station on the Guangshen railway.

With the acceleration of Guangshen Railway, Tangtouxia railway station has been suspended in 2006.

Preceding station	China Railway	Following station
Zhangmutou towards Beijing West	Beijing–Kowloon railway	Shigu towards Hung Hom
Zhangmutou towards Guangzhou	Guangzhou–Shenzhen railway	Shigu towards Shenzhen
