= Tiantangwei railway station =

Abandoned railway station in Dongguan, China

Coordinates: 22.7357°N 114.1132°E

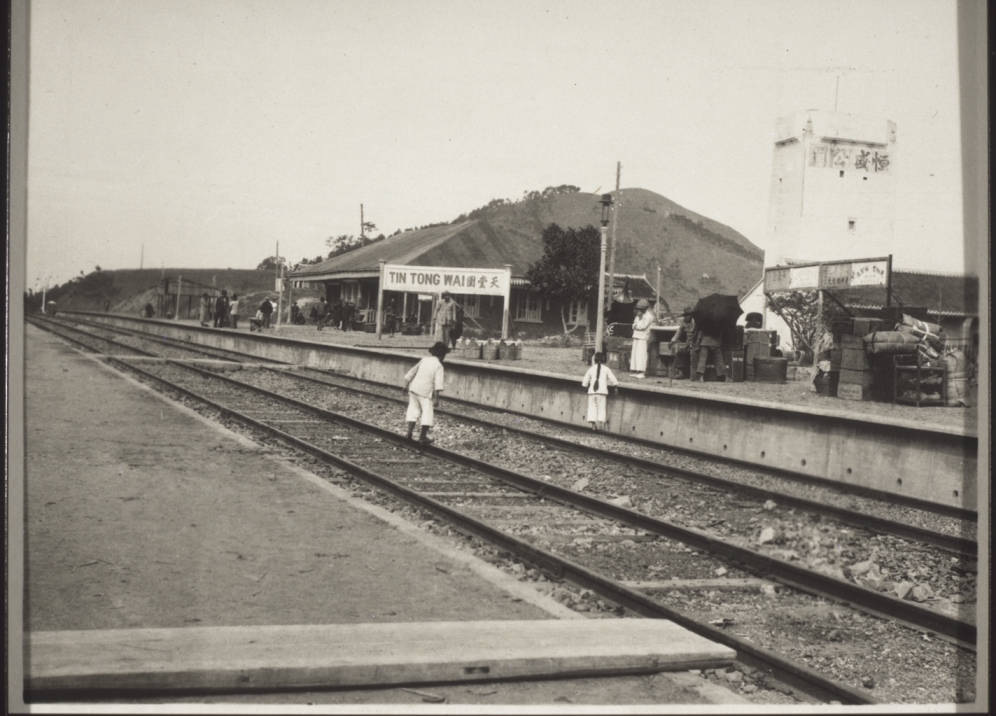
Tin Tong Wai station in 1928

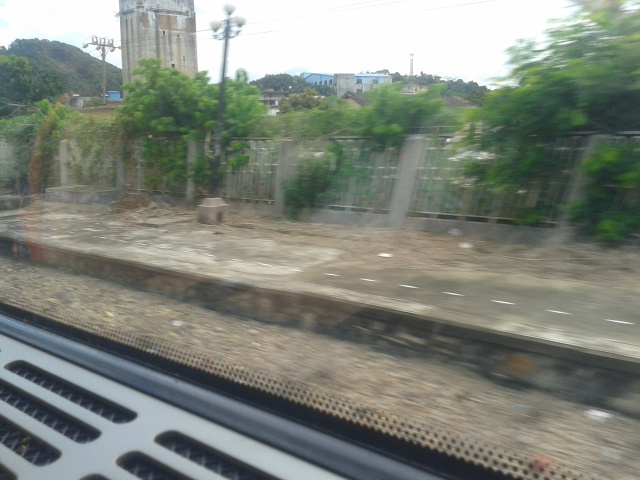
Shuttered TianTangWei station, 2014

Tiantangwei railway station (Chinese: 天堂围站, formerly Tin Tong Wai) was a station in Fenggang Town, Dongguan City, Guangdong Province, China. It is a level 4 station according to the scale of stations by the Chinese Ministry of Railways. It is on the Guangzhou-Shenzhen and Jingjiu Railways, opened in 1911 and closed in 2005.

Preceding station	China Railway	Following station
Shigu towards Guangzhou	Guangzhou–Shenzhen railway	Pinghu towards Shenzhen
Shigu towards Beijing West	Beijing–Kowloon railway	Pinghu towards Hung Hom
