= Changping railway station (Guangdong) =

Chinese railway station

Changping 常平
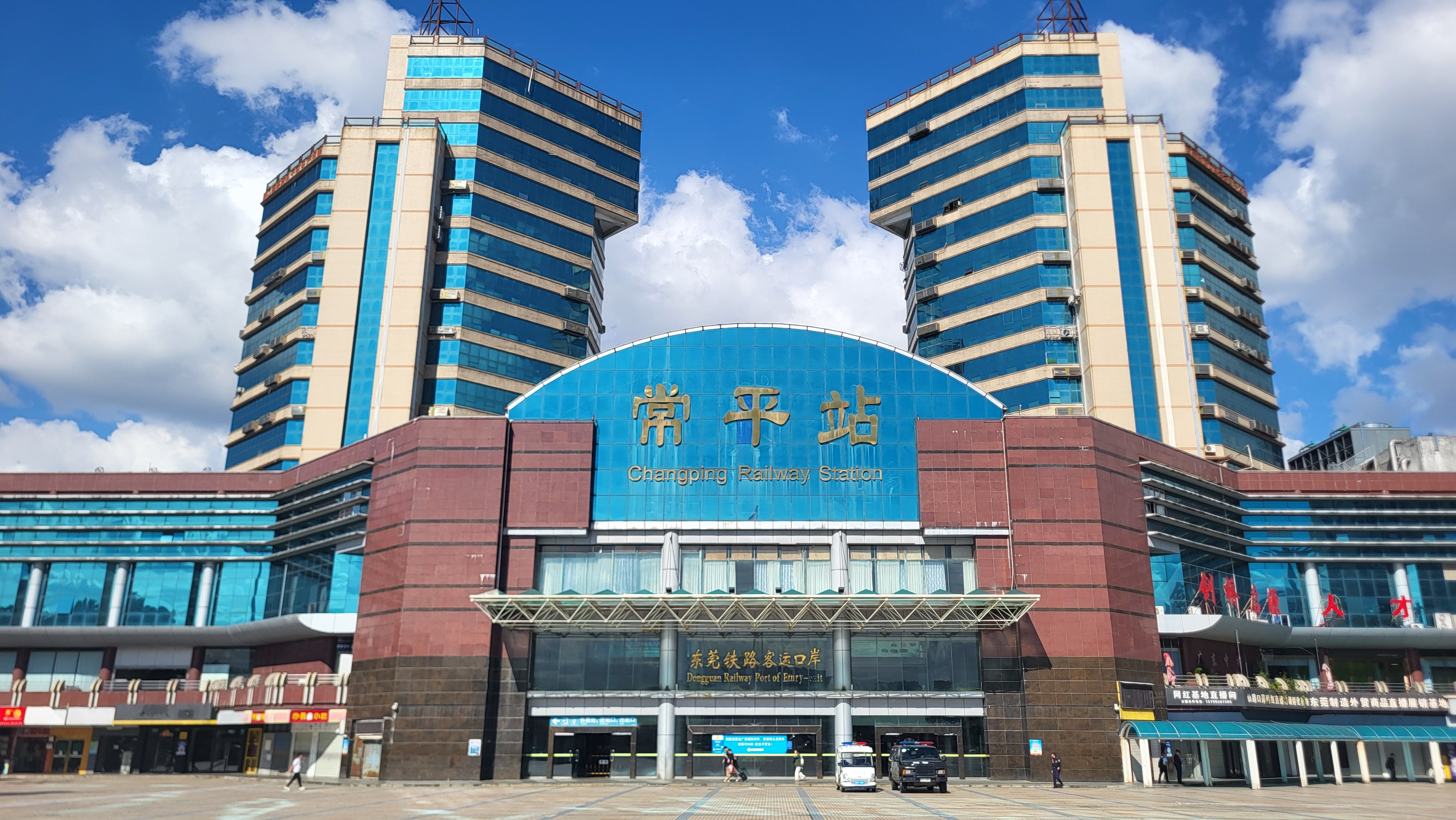

General information
- Location: China
- Coordinates: 22°59′10″N 114°00′05″E
- Lines: Guangshen railway, Guangmeishan railway, Jingjiu railway, Guangdong through train

Other information
- Station code: TMIS code: 23768; Telegraph code: DAQ; Pinyin code: CPI
Location

Changping railway station, formerly Sheung Ping railway station (at opening) and Dongguan railway station (until 2014), serves the city of Dongguan in Guangdong Province, China, located in Changping Town of the city. It is served by Guangshen railway, Guangmeishan railway, Jingjiu railway as well as the Guangdong through train service.

It was a port of entry to China for passenger trains from Kowloon, Hong Kong on the Guangdong through train service.

== Configuration ==
The station is configured in a northwest–southeast alignment. Trains departing to the northwest continue along the Guangshen railway towards Guangzhou. To the southeast, there is a junction where the Guangshen railway merges with the Guangmeishan railway and Jingjiu railway (coming from the east). The Guangshen railway continues south towards Shenzhen, where it is connected to the East Rail line of Hong Kong at the border near Luohu/Lo Wu. The Jingjiu railway continues east through the Dongguan East station then onwards towards Beijing.

== History ==
Sheungping railway station was opened in 1911 along with the Chinese section of Kowloon-Canton Railway, Sheungping being the Cantonese-based postal romanization of Changping, which is Putonghua-based.

The Guangdong through train service started to call at Changping railway station in 1994, bringing convenience to passengers travelling between Hong Kong and Dongguan, especially Hong Kong residents who reside in the vicinity of Dongguan and commute back to Hong Kong on a daily basis. Since 1997, it also became a port of entry for the Beijing–Kowloon through train and Shanghai–Kowloon through train services, and at that time all passengers departing from Kowloon were required to leave the train with all their belongings for immigration and customs checks before boarding the train again for their destinations (Beijing or Shanghai), vice versa. The Beijing and Shanghai through trains no longer stops at this station (and became non-stop services) since Beijing West and Shanghai stations set up their own immigration facilities and became ports of entry in October 2003.

Dongguan station will be renamed "Changping station" once again with effect from 20 June 2013. The name "Dongguan station" will be used by another station on the Guangshen railway line which is now under construction and was once known as "New Shilong station" in its planning stage.

| Preceding station | China Railway High-speed | Following station |
|---|---|---|
| Dongguan towards Guangzhou | Guangzhou–Shenzhen railway | Zhangmutou towards Shenzhen |
| Preceding station | China Railway | Following station |
| Chashan towards Guangzhou | Guangzhou–Shenzhen railway | Zhangmutou towards Shenzhen |
| Dongguan East towards Beijing West | Beijing–Kowloon railway | Zhangmutou towards Hung Hom |
