= Zhangmutou railway station =

Railway station in Zhangmutou, China

Zhangmutou 樟木頭
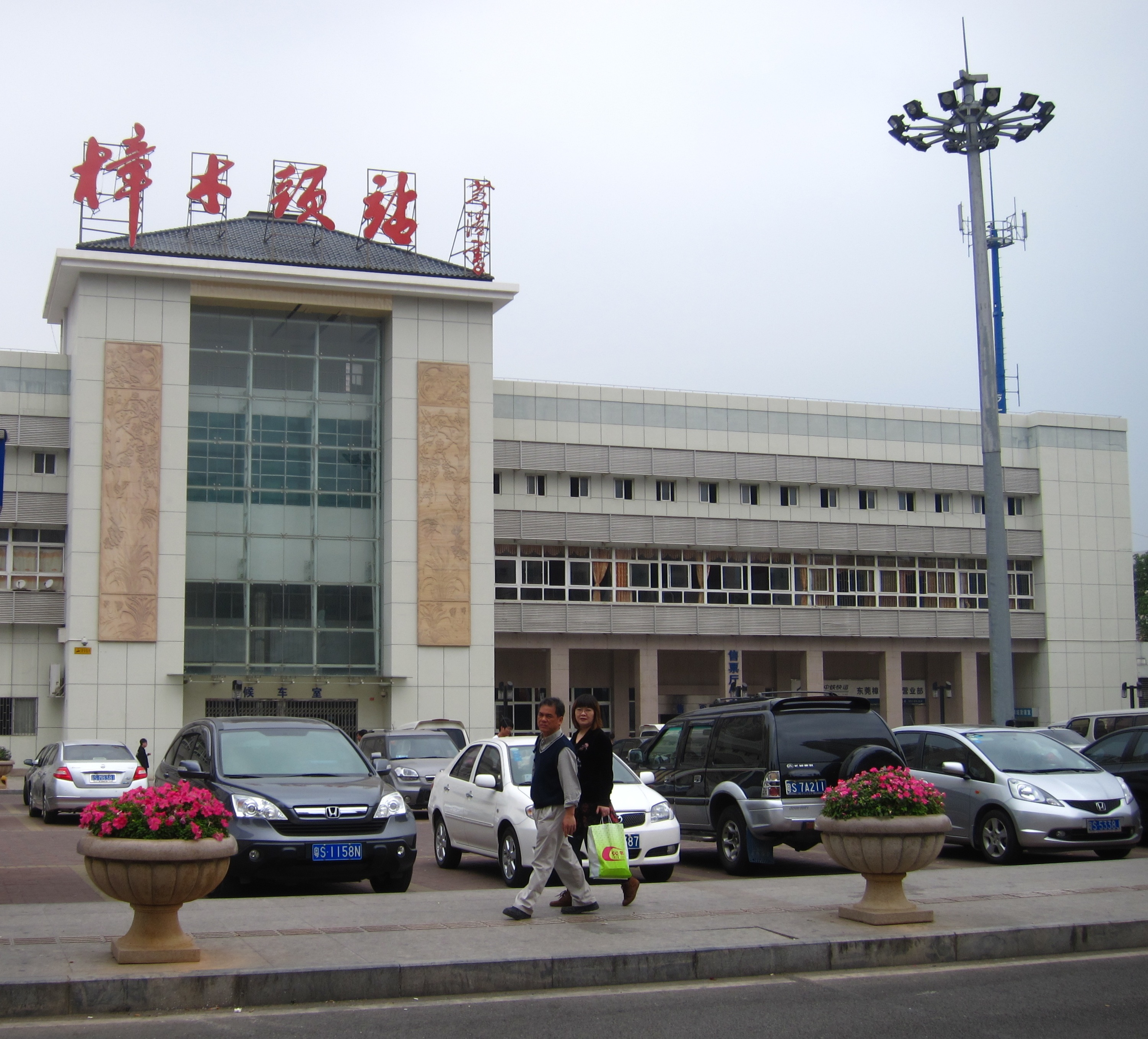

General information
- Location: China
- Coordinates: 22.90161°N 114.0680°E
- Line(s): Guangzhou–Shenzhen railway

Services
Preceding station	China Railway	Following station
Changping towards Beijing West	Beijing–Kowloon railway	Tangtouxia towards Hung Hom
Changping towards Guangzhou	Guangzhou–Shenzhen railway	Tangtouxia towards Shenzhen

Zhangmutou (formerly Cheung Muk Tou) is a railway station that serves the town of Zhangmutou in Dongguan City, Guangdong Province, China. It is a stop on the Guangzhou–Shenzhen railway.

== History ==
On 1 January 2009, a new square was opened adjacent to the station.

From 10 April 2021, the number of services calling at Zhangmutou was reduced and the destinations were limited to Guangzhou and Shenzhen. However, from 25 June, services levels were increased again.
