= Shipai railway station =

Railway station in Guangzhou, Guangdong

Shipai 石牌
- Shipai railway station

General information
- Location: Tianhe District, Guangzhou, Guangdong; China
- Coordinates: 23°8′35″N 113°21′46″E
- Lines: Guangzhou–Shenzhen railway Guangzhou–Shenzhen intercity railway
Location

Shipai railway station (Chinese: 石牌站) is a railway station on the Guangzhou–Shenzhen railway and the Guangzhou–Shenzhen intercity railway in Tianhe District, Guangzhou, China.

== History ==
A national timetable change on 10 April 2021 saw passenger service reintroduced at this station.
