= Guangshen Railway (company) =

Chinese railway operator

- Company type: public
- Traded as: SSE: 601333 (A share); SEHK: 525 (H share); NYSE: GSH (1996-2020)
- Industry: Railway operations
- Founded: 1996
- Headquarters: Shenzhen, China
- Key people: Wu Yong (Chairman)
- Owner: CR (37.12%)
- Parent: CR Guangzhou
- Website: gsrc.com

Guangshen Railway Co., Ltd.
- Simplified Chinese: 广深铁路股份有限公司
- Traditional Chinese: 廣深鐵路股份有限公司
- Literal meaning: Guang[zhou] Shen[zhen] Railway Joint-Stock Limited Company
Transcriptions

Guangshen Railway
- Simplified Chinese: 广深铁路
- Traditional Chinese: 廣深鐵路
Transcriptions

Guangshen Railway Co., Ltd. (GSRC) is the operator of Guangzhou-Shenzhen Railway (Guang-shen Railway), the 152-kilometre railway link between Guangzhou and Shenzhen in Guangdong, China. The company is engaged in railway passenger and freight transportation between Shenzhen and Pingshi and certain long-distance passenger transportation services. It also cooperates with MTR Corporation in Hong Kong in operating the Guangdong Through Train passenger service. The market capitalization of Guangshen Railway Co., Ltd. is around HK$5 billion in January 2016.

== History ==
Guangshen Railway was the Chinese section of Kowloon–Canton Railway (Canton was the old name of Guangzhou). In 1949 the Chinese section was taken under the control of the new state. It was under the supervision of Guangzhou Railway Bureau (now Guangzhou Railway Group). The railway was later incorporated as Guangshen Railway Corp. (Chinese: 广深铁路公司) in 1984.

=== Guangshen Railway Co., Ltd. ===
The company was re-incorporated in 1996 as a joint-stock company with limited liabilities. Its H shares were listed on the Hong Kong Stock Exchange in 1996; the ADR of the H shares also listed in the New York Stock Exchange in the same year. Its A shares were listed on the Shanghai Stock Exchange in 2006. It is currently the only Chinese railway enterprise with shares listed in Shanghai, Hong Kong and New York.

== Operations ==
=== United Kingdom ===
In June 2017 in partnership with MTR Corporation, the company was shortlisted to bid for the West Coast Partnership franchise in the United Kingdom.
