= Tangxia, Dongguan =

Tangxia 塘厦镇
- Town
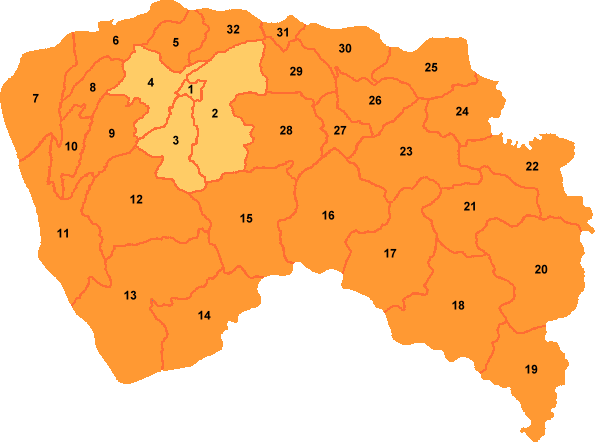
- Tangxia is labeled '18' on this map of Dongguan

- Location within Guangdong
- Coordinates: 22°48′25″N 114°04′21″E
- Country: People's Republic of China
- Province: Guangdong
- Prefecture: Dongguan
- Time zone: UTC+8 (China Standard)

Tangxia (simplified Chinese: 塘厦镇; traditional Chinese: 塘廈鎮; pinyin: Tángxià zhèn) is a town under the direct jurisdiction of Dongguan prefecture-level city in Guangdong province, China. It is located in the southeast of Dongguan's prefectural area and borders the Shenzhen districts of Longhua to the south and Guangming to the west.

== Transportation ==
Tangxia will host four Dongguan Rail Transit stations under the current plans for construction of Line 4:

1. Tangxiaxi (Tangxia West)
2. Tangxia Center (Interchange with the North > South branch of the same line)
3. Dongxing Dadao
4. Tangxiadong (Tangxia East)

There is a bus service from Tangxia to Shenzhen Bao'an International Airport in Shenzhen.
