= Shekou West railway station =

Railway station in Shenzhen, China

Coordinates: 22.4814°N 113.8993°E

Shekou West 蛇口西

General information
- Location: Nanshan District, Shenzhen, Guangdong; China
- Operated by: Shenzhen Pingnan Railway Company, Ministry of Railways of the People's Republic of China
- Line(s): Pingnan Railway

Shekou West was a freight station in Nanshan District in Shenzhen. It was located near Chiwan station of the Shenzhen Metro. The branch line from Shenzhen West railway station to Shekou was dismantled in 2016, along with the line from Shenzhen West to Mawan.
