= Bantian railway station =

Railway station in Longhua, Shenzhen, Guangdong

Bantian 坂田

General information
- Location: Bantian Subdistrict, Longgang District, Shenzhen, Guangdong; China
- Coordinates: 22°37′34″N 114°2′47″E
- Line: Pinghu–Nanshan railway

Services
Preceding station	China Railway	Following station
Mugu towards Pinghu	Pinghu–Nanshan railway	Xili towards Shenzhen West
Location

Bantian railway station (Chinese: 坂田站) is a railway station in Bantian Subdistrict, Longgang District, Shenzhen, Guangdong, China. It is an intermediate stop on the Pinghu–Nanshan railway.

== History ==
The station opened to freight in 1993 and to passengers in 1994. Passenger service was suspended on 28 December 2013.

== Services ==
In 2012 there were three northbound departures and no southbound departures.
