= Line 22 (Shenzhen Metro) =

Future Shenzhen Metro line

- 22

Overview
- Status: Under construction
- Locale: Shenzhen, Guangdong
- Termini: Shangsha (Phase 1) Future: Futian Bonded Area South; Liguang
- Stations: 21 (Phase 1)

Service
- Type: Rapid transit
- System: Shenzhen Metro
- Services: 1
- Operator: SZMC (Shenzhen Metro Group)

History
- Planned opening: 2028; 2 years' time

Technical
- Line length: 34.2km (Phase 1)
- Character: Underground
- Operating speed: 100km/h

Line 22 of the Shenzhen Metro is an express line under construction, which will connect the districts of Futian, Longhua and Longgang for 38 kilometers and 23 stations. Construction began on 2 January 2024, and the line is expected to open in 2028. The first phase of Line 22 will run from Shangsha in Futian District to Liguang in Longhua District, with 21 stations and 34.2 kilometers of track. The line is proposed to use 6 car type A trains. It is proposed to extend into Dongguan in long term planning.

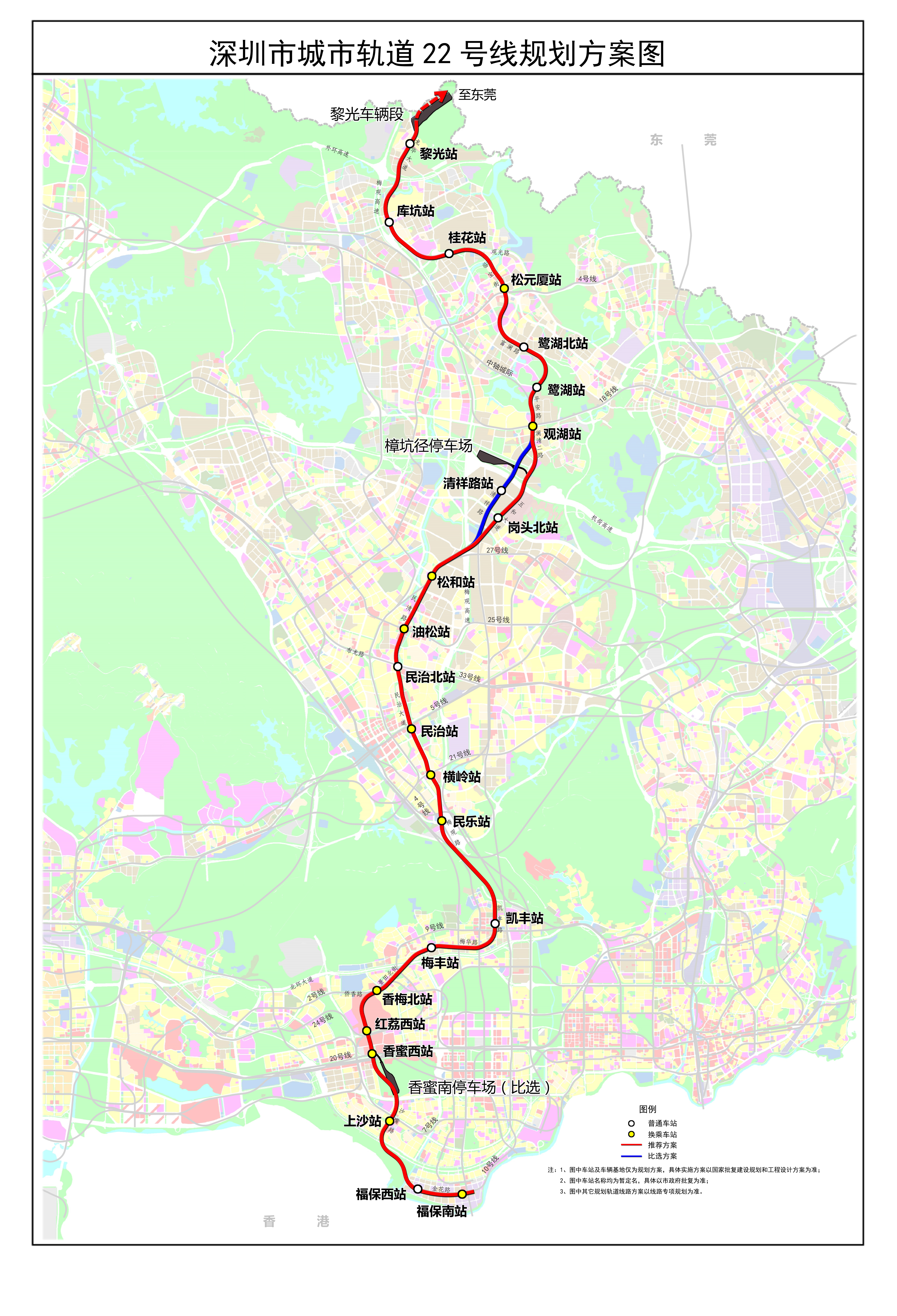
Line 22 full alignment (in Chinese)

== Stations (Phase 1) ==
Station name		Connections	Location
English	Chinese	Connections	Location
Shangsha	上沙	7	Futian
Xiangmi West	香蜜西	14 20	Futian
Hongli West	红荔西		Futian
Xiangmei North	香梅北	2 8	Futian
Meifeng	梅丰		Futian
Kaifeng	凯丰		Futian
Minle	民乐	4	Longhua
Hengling	横岭		Longhua
Minzhi	民治	5	Longhua
Minzhi North	民治北	Shenda	Longhua
Yousong	油松	25	Longhua
Songhe	松和	27	Longhua
Gangtou North	岗头北		Longgang
Fengmen'ao	风门坳		Longgang
Guanhu	观湖		Longhua
Luhu	鹭湖		Longhua
Luhu North	鹭湖北		Longhua
Songyuanxia	松元厦	4	Longhua
Guihua	桂花		Longhua
Kukeng	库坑		Longhua
Liguang	黎光		Longhua
