= Line 25 =

Line 25 may refer to:

== China ==
- Line 25, Shanghai Metro
- Line 25 (Beijing Subway), better known as the Fangshan Line
- Line 25 (Shenzhen Metro)
- Line 25 (Guangzhou Metro)

== Europe ==
- Belgian railway line 25
- Amsterdam tram line 25

== See also ==
- Route 25 (disambiguation)
