= Chiwan railway station =

Former railway station in China

Coordinates: 22.4758°N 113.8883°E

Chiwan railway station is a former railway station on the Pingnan Railway. It opened in 1993. In 2005, Chiwan railway station was demolished to make way for a new access road into Chiwan port. The port holdings company paid out compensation of over 34 million yuan as a result of the redevelopment.

Preceding station	China Railway	Following station
Mawan towards Pinghu	Pinghu–Nanshan railway	Terminus
