= Pinghu (disambiguation) =

Pinghu may refer to:

- Pinghu, Zhejiang, city in China
- Pinghu, Guangdong, subdistrict of Longgang District, Shenzhen, Guangdong, China
- Pinghu railway station, railway station in Shenzhen, Guangdong, China
