= Daxin station =

Metro station in Shenzhen, China

Coordinates: 22°31′55″N 113°54′55″E

Daxin 大新
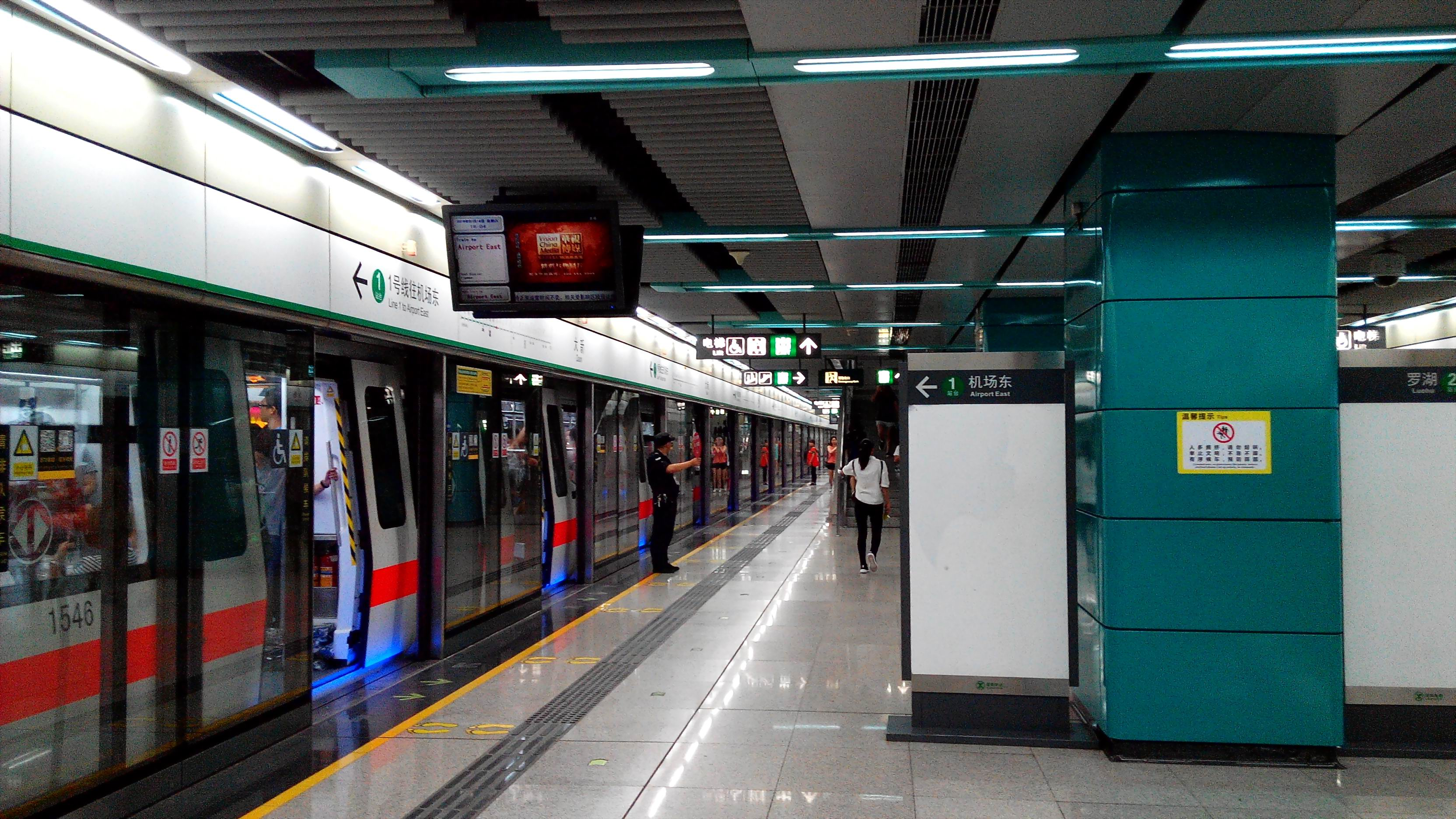

Chinese name
- Chinese: 大新
Transcriptions
Standard Mandarin
- Hanyu Pinyin: Dà Xīn
Yue: Cantonese
- Jyutping: Daai6 San1

General information
- Location: Nanshan District, Shenzhen, Guangdong; China
- Operator: SZMC (Shenzhen Metro Group)
- Line: Line 1
- Platforms: 2 (1 island platform)
- Tracks: 2

Construction
- Structure type: Underground
- Accessible: Yes

Other information
- Station code: 111

History
- Opened: 15 June 2011; 15 years ago

Services
Preceding station	Shenzhen Metro	Following station
Liyumen towards Airport East	Line 1	Taoyuan towards Luohu
Route map
Location

Daxin station (Chinese: 大新站; pinyin: Dàxīn Zhàn; Jyutping: Daai6 San1 Zaam6) is a station on Line 1 of the Shenzhen Metro in Shenzhen, Guangdong Province, China. The station was opened on 15 June 2011.

== Station layout ==
G	–	Exit
B1F; Concourse	Lobby	Customer Service, Shops, Vending machines, ATMs
B2F; Platforms	Platform 1	← Line 1 towards Airport East (Liyumen)
B2F; Platforms	Island platform, doors will open on the left
B2F; Platforms	Platform 2	Line 1 towards Luohu (Taoyuan) →

== Exits ==
Exit		Destination
Exit A		Qianhai Road (E), Nanxin Road, Daxin Primary School, Nantou Sub-district Office, Guankouxiacun, Daxincun, Yijia Haibian Xincun
Exit B		Qianhai Road (W), Qianhai Primary School, Nanshan District Organization Kindergarten, Qianhai Garden, Zhenye International Business Center
Exit C	C1	Taoyuan Road (S), Yueliangwan Boulevard, Taoli Garden, Gangwan Lidu Residential Area, Yefeng Hai'an
Exit C	C2	Qianhai Road (W), Shenzhen Nanshan Qianhai School, Shenzhen West Railway Station, Gangwan Lidu Residential Area, Xinde Homestead, Nangang Business Building, Yuhai Xinyuan, Yunqi Xi'ange, Tianlang Fengqing, Yangguang Zonglü, Lühai Mingdu
Exit D		Taoyuan Road (S), Daxin Community Work Station, Daxin Xincun, Jintaoyuan Building, Guoxing Building, Dongfang Yinzuo Building
