= Pinghu South railway station =

Railway station in Shenzhen, China

Pinghu South 平湖南
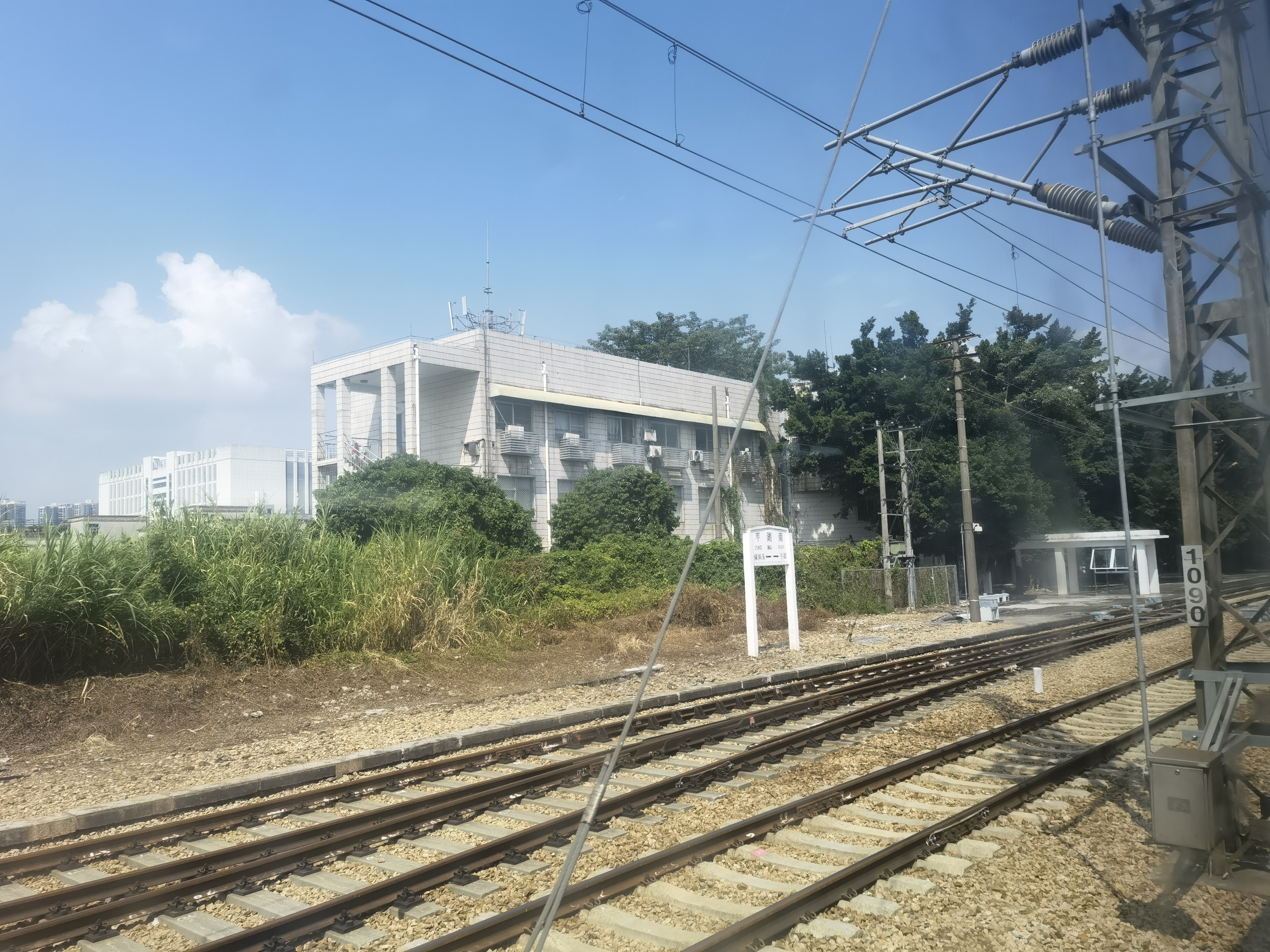
- Main building of the station

General information
- Location: Pinghu Subdistrict, Longgang District, Shenzhen, Guangdong; China
- Coordinates: 22.670753°N 114.129559°E
Location

Pinghu South railway station (Chinese: 平湖南站) is a freight handling station in Shenzhen, China.

== History ==
The first phase of a new road-to-rail container terminal, comprising two railway lines, opened at the station on 28 July 2020.

== Location ==
The station is situated on the Guangzhou–Shenzhen railway south of the Pinghu railway station. Two branch lines (Pinghu–Nanshan railway and Pinghu–Yantian railway) start here. Additionally there is a chord between the Xiamen–Shenzhen railway and the Guangzhou–Shenzhen railway south of this station.
