= Line 27 =

Line 27 may refer to:

- Line 27 (Chengdu Metro), under construction
- Line 27 (Chongqing Rail Transit), under construction
- Line 27 (Shenzhen Metro), under planning
- Changping line of Beijing Subway, also known as Line 27
- Line 27 (Guangzhou Metro), branch of Line 14, planned to be split off into its own line.
