= Line 33 =

Line 33 may refer to:

- Line 33 (Shenzhen Metro), rail line in China
- Line 33 (Zürich), a railway service in Switzerland
