= Line 29 =

Line 29 may refer to:

- Line 29 (Shenzhen Metro), a metro line under construction in Shenzhen, China
- Line 29 (Beijing Subway), a light rail line in Haidian District of Beijing, China
