= Xili railway station =

Railway station in Shenzhen, China

Coordinates: 22.56562°N 113.9434°E

Xili 西丽
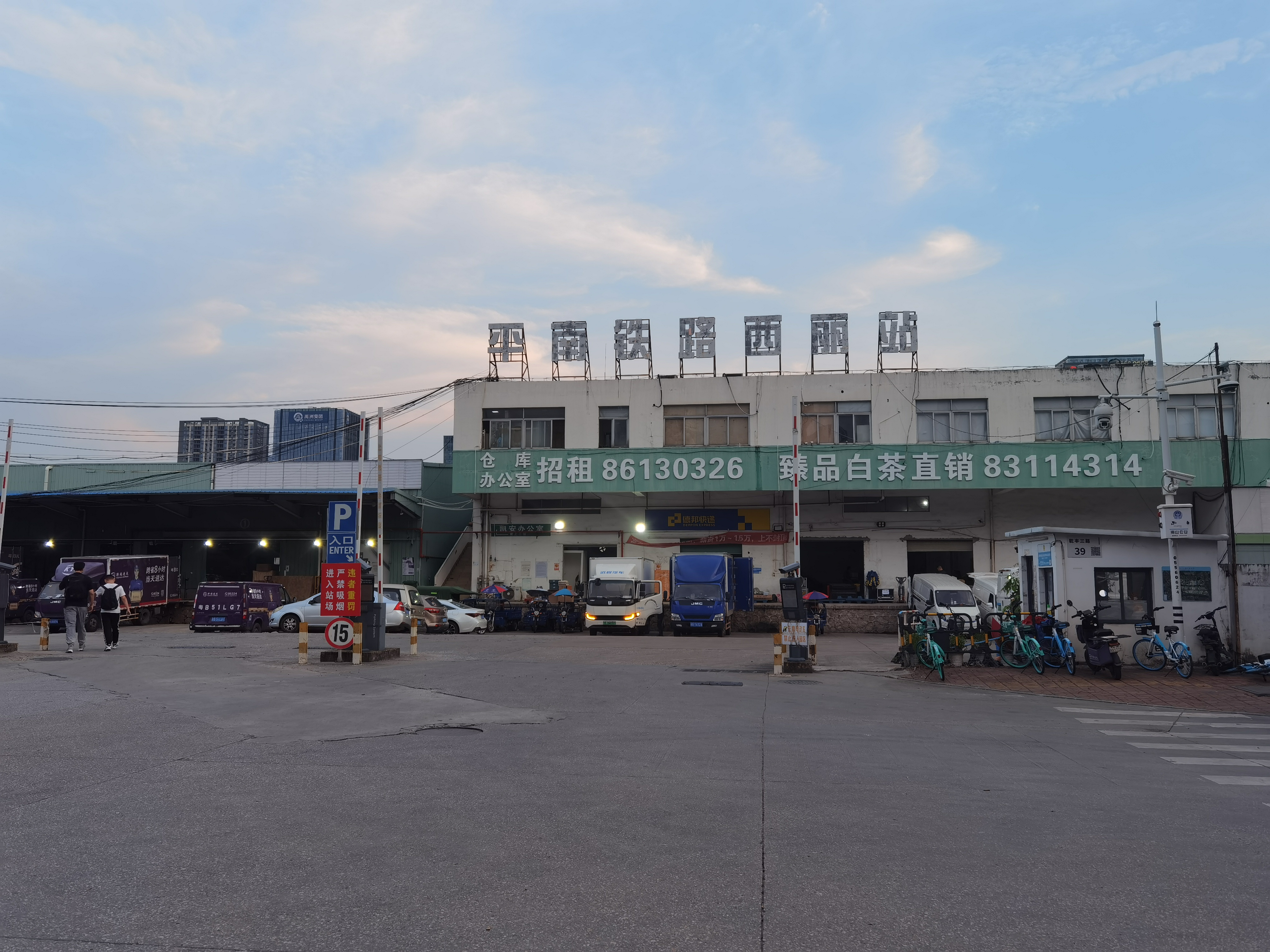

General information
- Location: Nanshan District, Shenzhen, Guangdong; China
- Operated by: Shenzhen Pingnan Railway Company; China Railway Guangzhou Group
- Lines: Pingnan Railway; Ganzhou–Shenzhen high-speed railway Shenzhen–Zhanjiang high-speed railway (under construction); Shenzhen–Shanwei high-speed railway (under construction)

Services
Preceding station	China Railway	Following station
Bantian towards Pinghu	Pinghu–Nanshan railway	Shenzhen West Terminus
Preceding station	Shenzhen Metro	Following station
Hi-Tech North towards Dongjiaotou	Line 13 Does not stop here	Shigu towards Gongming North
Langshan Road towards Clockwise/outer	Line 15 Under construction	Dashi 1st Road towards Anticlockwise/inner
Songpingcun Terminus	Line 27 Under planning	Xili South towards Gangtou West
Xili East towards Hongshuwan South	Line 29 Under planning	Xili West towards Xingdong
Location

Xili railway station is a railway station in the Nanshan District, Shenzhen on the Pingnan Railway.

The station will be one of two terminals of the existing Ganzhou–Shenzhen high-speed railway, the other being Shenzhen North.

== History ==
On September 2, 2007, two empty freight carriages derailed at a switch beside the station. The carriages were damaged and services on the railway suspended. Repair works were completed and services resumed by the following day.

== Metro station ==
It will be served by Line 13 of Shenzhen Metro in 2027.
