= Line 15 (Shenzhen Metro) =

Future Shenzhen Metro line

Overview
- Status: Under construction
- Locale: Shenzhen, Guangdong
- Termini: Loop line
- Stations: 24

Service
- Type: Rapid transit
- System: Shenzhen Metro
- Services: 1
- Operator: SZMC (Shenzhen Metro Group)

History
- Planned opening: 2027; 1 year's time

Technical
- Line length: 32.2 kilometres (20.0 mi)
- Character: Underground
- Operating speed: 80km/h

Line 15 of the Shenzhen Metro is a Phase V expansion metro line under construction. It will be a loop line which will connect the districts of Bao'an, Nanshan and Qianhai for 32.2 kilometers and 24 stations. Construction started on 28 June 2023, and the line is expected to open in 2027. The line is proposed to use 4 car and 6 car type A trains.

== Stations ==
Station name		Connections	Location
English	Chinese	Connections	Location
— ↑ Loop line towards Tinghai ↑ —
Qianhai Bonded Area	前保		Nanshan
Tonggang Road	通港路		Nanshan
Railway Park	铁路公园	5	Nanshan
Moon Bay Park	月亮湾公园		Nanshan
Sihai	四海	12	Nanshan
Dongbin Road	东滨路		Nanshan
Minghai	名海		Nanshan
Shenzhen University South	深大南	9	Nanshan
Shenzhen University North	深大北		Nanshan
Maqueling	麻雀岭		Nanshan
Langshan Road	朗山路		Nanshan
Xili High Speed Railway Station	西丽高铁站	13 27 29; ELQ	Nanshan
Dashi Hill	打石山		Nanshan
Tongleguan	同乐关		Nanshan
Honglang North	洪浪北	5	Bao'an
Bao'an Park	宝安公园		Bao'an
Liutang	流塘	12	Bao'an
Xixiang Park	西乡公园	20	Bao'an
Pingzhou	坪洲	1	Bao'an
Haicheng	海城		Bao'an
Jingang	金港		Bao'an
Chanwan	铲湾		Bao'an
Chanwan South	铲湾南		Bao'an
Tinghai	听海		Nanshan
— ↓ Loop line towards Qianhai Bonded Area ↓ —
