= Sungang railway station =

Freight station in Guandong, China

Coordinates: 22.5696°N 114.112°E

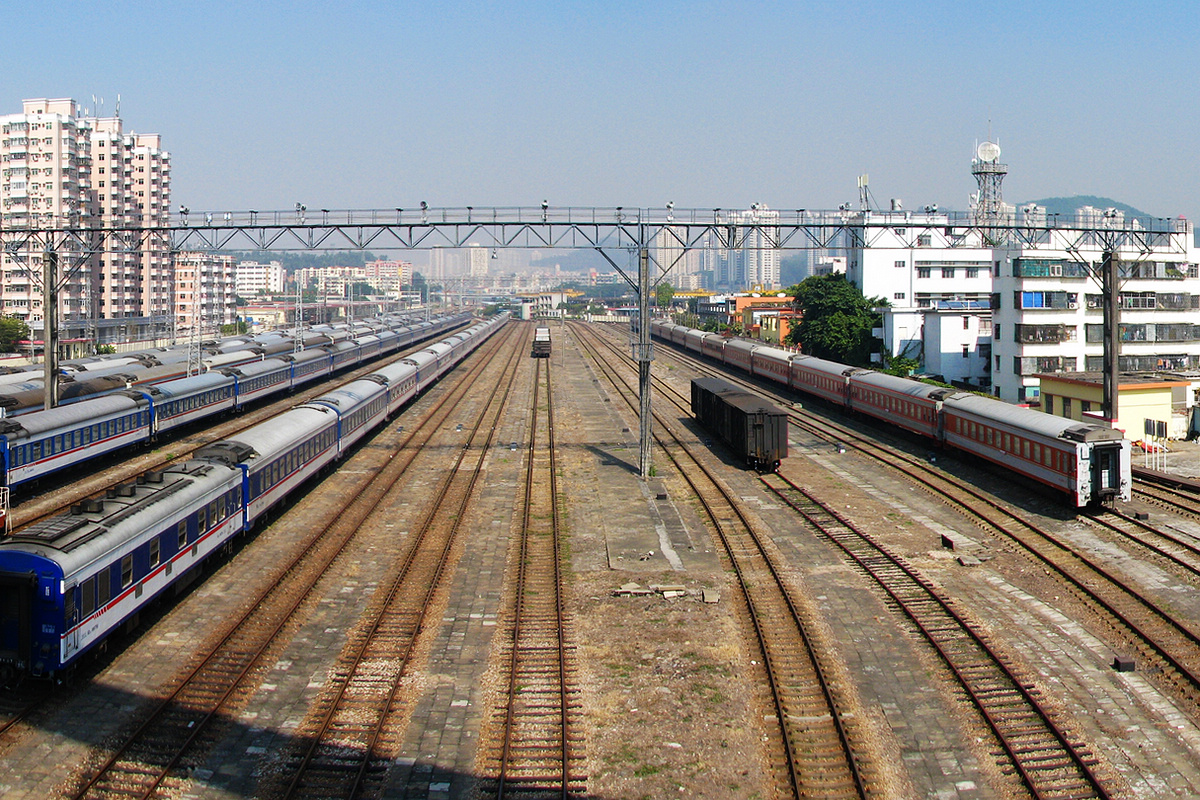
Some of the tracks at Sungang station in December 2010

Sungang railway station (Chinese: 筍崗站; Jyutping: seon^{2} gong^{1} zaam^{6}), formerly "Shenzhen North railway station," is a freight station in Luohu District of Shenzhen, Guangdong, China. The current station was opened in June 1973 and is on Guangshen railway and Jingjiu railway.

== History ==
The original station was opened in 1962 with its name "Sungang", expanded in 1973 and changed to its "Shenzhen North" in 1977. Its name was changed back to "Sungang" again in 2008 due to the same name as another "Shenzhen North railway station" in the Guangzhou–Shenzhen–Hong Kong Express Rail Link.

== Facilities ==
The station has 52 freight tracks and a total area of 190,000 square metres (2,000,000 sq ft).

Preceding station	China Railway	Following station
Shenzhen East towards Guangzhou	Guangzhou–Shenzhen railway	Shenzhen Terminus
Shenzhen East towards Beijing West	Beijing–Kowloon railway	Shenzhen towards Hung Hom
