= Mawan railway station =

Former railway station in Shenzhen, China

Mawan was a railway station on the Pinghu–Nanshan railway in Nanshan District, Shenzhen. The station was closed in 2016.

Preceding station	China Railway	Following station
Shenzhen West towards Pinghu	Pinghu–Nanshan railway 2005–2016	Terminus
Shenzhen West towards Pinghu	Pinghu–Nanshan railway 1993–2005	Chiwan Terminus
