= Liyumen station =

Metro station in Shenzhen, China

Coordinates: 22°31′55″N 113°54′27″E

Liyumen 鲤鱼门
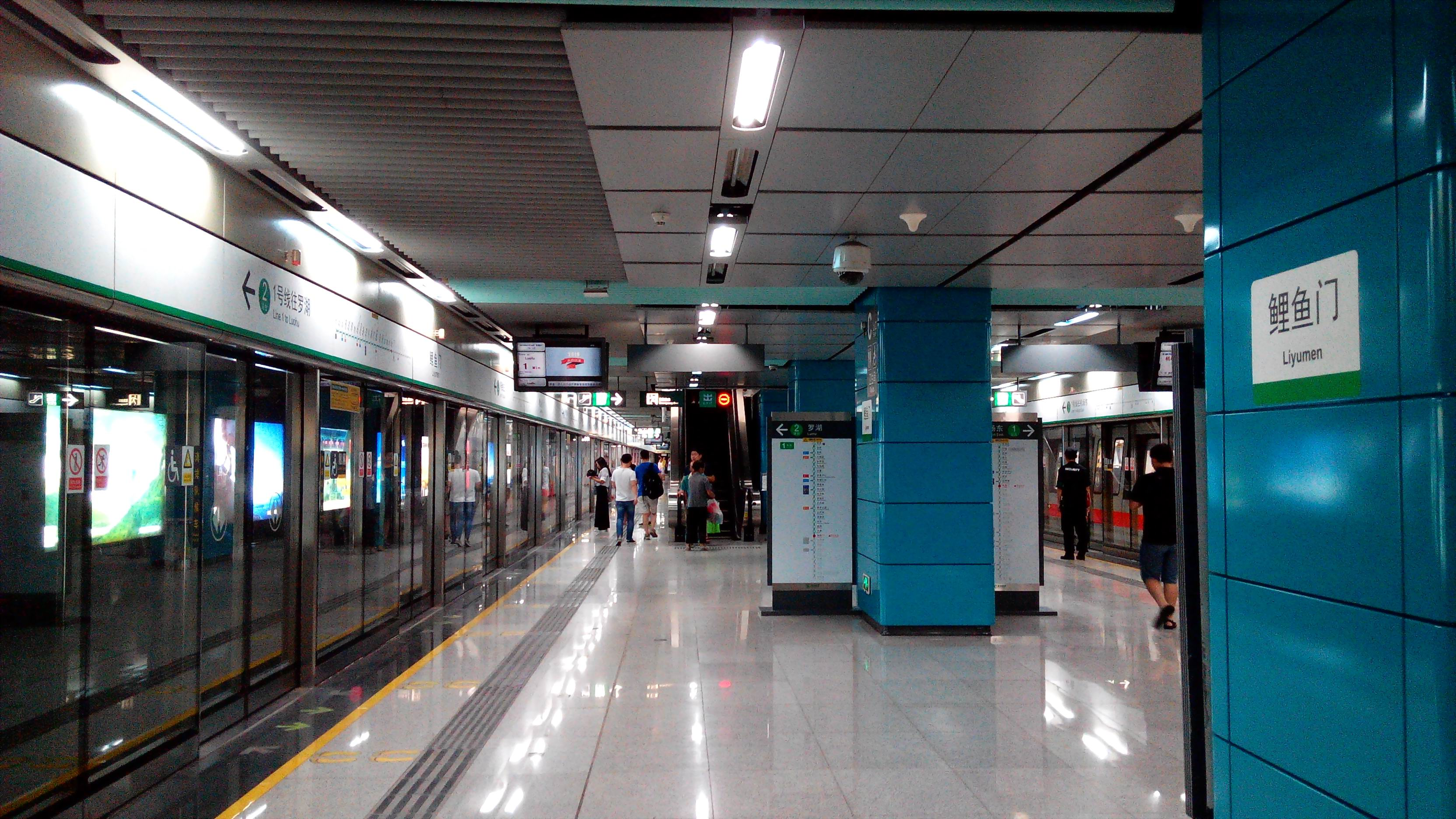

Chinese name
- Traditional Chinese: 鯉魚門
- Simplified Chinese: 鲤鱼门
- Literal meaning: Amur carp gate/door
Transcriptions
Standard Mandarin
- Hanyu Pinyin: Lǐyú Mén
Yue: Cantonese
- Jyutping: Lei5jyu4 Mun4

General information
- Location: Nanshan District, Shenzhen, Guangdong; China
- Operator: SZMC (Shenzhen Metro Group)
- Line: Line 1
- Platforms: 2 (1 island platform)
- Connections: Shenzhen West (200 m (660 ft))

Construction
- Structure type: Underground

History
- Opened: 15 June 2011; 15 years ago

Services
Preceding station	Shenzhen Metro	Following station
Qianhaiwan towards Airport East	Line 1	Daxin towards Luohu
Route map
Location

Liyumen station (simplified Chinese: 鲤鱼门站; traditional Chinese: 鯉魚門站; pinyin: Lǐyúmén Zhàn; Jyutping: Lei5 Jyu4 Mun4 Zaan6) is a station on Line 1 of the Shenzhen Metro in Shenzhen, Guangdong Province, China. The station opened on 15 June 2011.

Shenzhen West railway station is located approximately 200 metres (660 ft) south of this station, providing long-distance conventional rail connections.

== Station layout ==
G	–	Exit
B1F; Concourse	Lobby	Customer Service, Shops, Vending machines, ATMs
B2F; Platforms	Platform 1	← Line 1 towards Airport East (Qianhaiwan)
B2F; Platforms	Island platform, doors will open on the left
B2F; Platforms	Platform 2	Line 1 towards Luohu (Daxin) →

== Exits ==
Exit	Destination
Exit A	6th Road (N), 11th Road (W)
Exit C	6th Road (S), Zhenhua Road (E)
Exit D	6th Road (S)
