= Line 27 (Shenzhen Metro) =

Future Shenzhen Metro line

- 27

Overview
- Status: Under construction
- Locale: Shenzhen, Guangdong
- Termini: Songpingcun, Jihua Hospital (Phase 1) Future: Qianwan Park West; Gangtou West, Yangmei North (Phase 1) Future: Yangmei
- Stations: 21 (Phase 1)

Service
- Type: Rapid transit
- System: Shenzhen Metro
- Services: 2
- Operator: SZMC (Shenzhen Metro Group)

History
- Planned opening: 2029; 3 years' time

Technical
- Line length: 25.6km (Phase 1)
- Character: Underground
- Operating speed: 80km/h

Line 27 of the Shenzhen Metro is a line under construction, which will connect the districts of Nanshan, Longhua and Longgang. Construction began on 25 April 2024. The first phase of Line 27 will run from Songpingcun in Nanshan District near Xili High Speed Railway Station to Gangtou West in Longgang District, and from Jihua Hospital to Yangmei North in Longgang District, with 21 stations and 25.6 kilometers of track. The line is proposed to use 6 car type A trains.

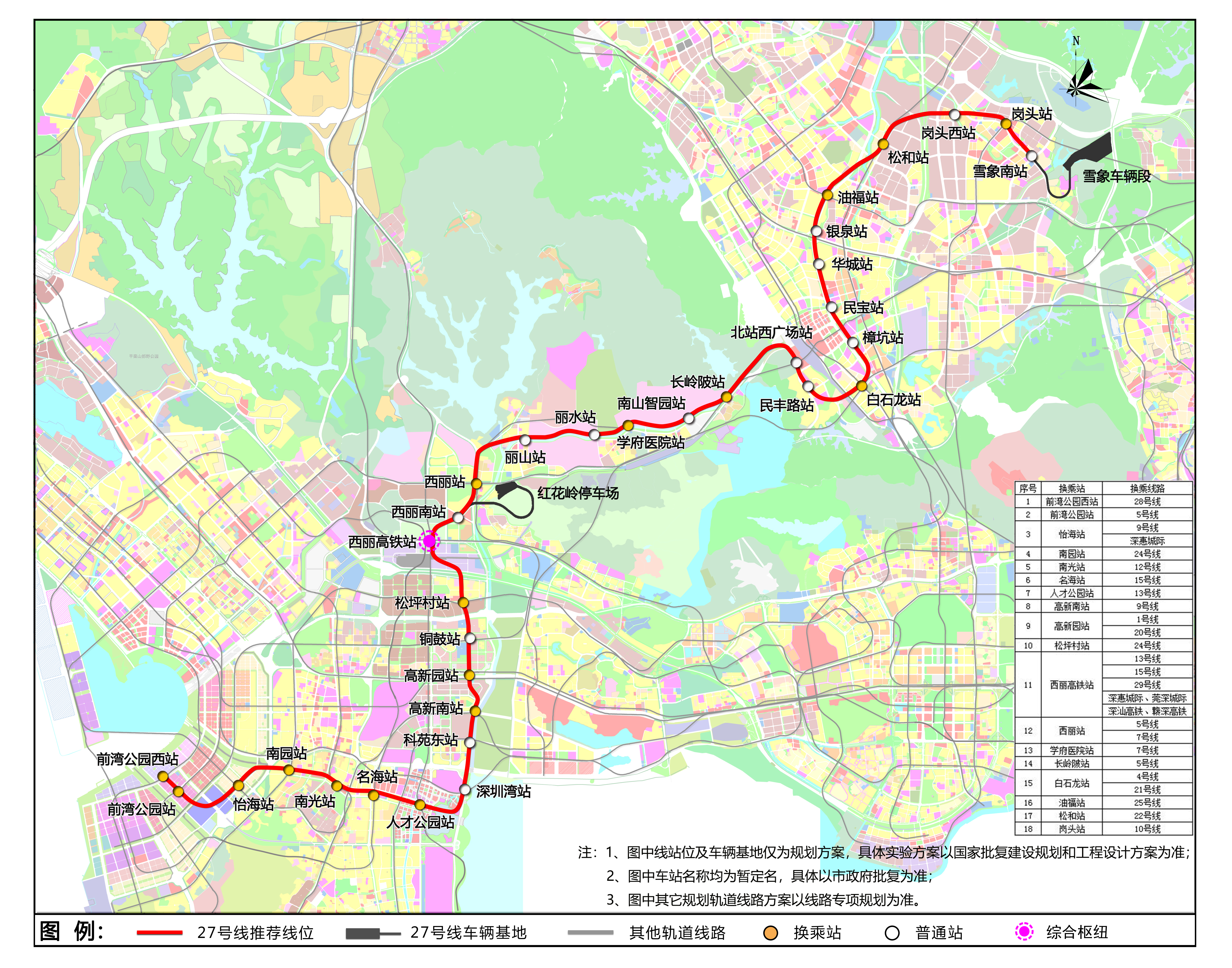
Line 27 full alignment (in Chinese)

== Stations (Phase 1) ==
Station name		Connections	Location
English	Chinese	Connections	Location
Songpingcun	松坪村		Nanshan
Xili High Speed Railway Station	西丽高铁站	13 15 29 Shenhui; ELQ	Nanshan
Wenguang	文光		Nanshan
Xili	西丽	5 7	Nanshan
Lishan	丽山		Nanshan
Lishui	丽水		Nanshan
SZU Lihu Campus	深大丽湖	7	Nanshan
Nanshan Innovation Park / SUSTech	南科大		Nanshan
Changlingpi	长岭陂	5	Nanshan
Shenzhen North Station West Square	北站西广场	4 5 6 (via Shenzhen North); XS GSH IOQ	Longhua
Minfeng Road	民丰路		Longhua
Baishilong	白石龙	4	Longhua
Zhangkeng	樟坑		Longhua
Minbao	民宝		Longhua
Huacheng	华城		Longhua
Yinquan	银泉		Longhua
Youfu	油福	25	Longhua
Songhe	松和	22	Longhua
Gangtou West	岗头西		Longgang
Jihua Hospital	吉华医院	25	Longgang
Yangmei North	杨美北		Longgang
