= Route 25 (disambiguation) =

Route 25 is a common name for roads and highways in many countries.

Route 25 may also refer to:

- Route 25 (MTA Maryland), a streetcar route in Baltimore, Maryland, part of the Baltimore Streetcar Museum's operation
- London Buses route 25

== See also ==
- Line 25 (disambiguation)
