= Line 25 (Shenzhen Metro) =

Future Shenzhen Metro line

- 25

Overview
- Status: Under construction
- Locale: Shenzhen, Guangdong
- Termini: Jihua Hospital (Phase 1) Future: Wenjindu; Shilong (Phase 1) Future: Shiyan
- Stations: 14 (Phase 1)

Service
- Type: Rapid transit
- System: Shenzhen Metro
- Services: 1
- Operator: SZMC (Shenzhen Metro Group)

History
- Planned opening: 2028; 2 years' time

Technical
- Line length: 16.2km (Phase 1)
- Character: Underground
- Operating speed: 80km/h

Line 25 of the Shenzhen Metro is a line under construction, which will connect across Shenzhen through the districts of Luohu, Longhua, Longgang and Bao'an for 38.5 kilometers and 30 stations. Construction began on 26 February 2024, and the line is expected to open in 2028. The first phase of Line 25 will run from Jihua Hospital in Longgang District to Shilong in Bao'an District, with 14 stations and 16.2 kilometers of track. The line is proposed to use 6 car type A trains.

== Stations (Phase 1) ==
Station name		Connections	Location
English	Chinese	Connections	Location
Jihua Hospital	吉华医院	27	Longgang
Bei'er Road	贝尔路	10	Longgang
Huangjun Hill	黄君山		Longgang
Shangyousong	上油松		Longhua
Yousong	油松	22	Longhua
Youfu	油福	27	Longhua
Jinglong	景龙		Longhua
Longhua	龙华	4	Longhua
Longhua Park	龙华公园		Longhua
Huafu	华富		Longhua
Huachang	华昌		Longhua
Shi'ao	石凹		Longhua
Creative Town	创意城		Longhua
Shilong	石龙		Bao'an
