= Shenzhen West railway station =

Railway station in Shenzhen, China

Shenzhenxi 深圳西
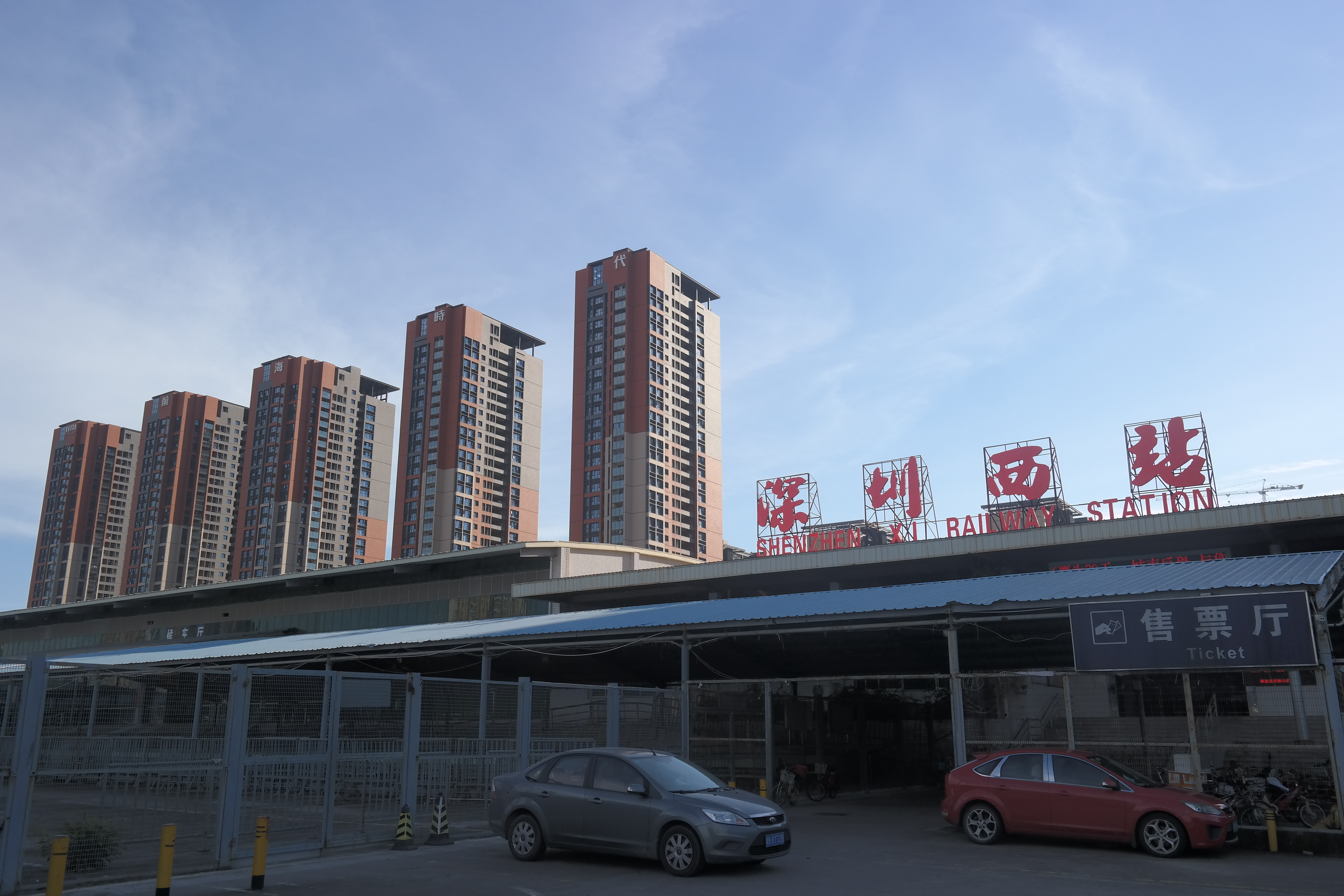
- Shenzhen West Railway Station (June 2019)

General information
- Location: Nanshan District, Shenzhen, Guangdong; China
- Coordinates: 22°31′53″N 113°54′10″E
- Operated by: Shenzhen Pingnan Railway Company, Ministry of Railways of the People's Republic of China
- Line: Pingnan Railway
- Platforms: 3
- Connections: Liyumen Station (200 metres)
Location

Shenzhen West railway station (Chinese: 深圳西站; pinyin: Shēnzhèn Xī Zhàn; Jyutping: sam1 zan3 sai1 zaam6) is a railway station on the Pingnan railway in Shenzhen, in the southern Chinese province of Guangdong. Constructed as a freight station in 1989, Passenger station was built during 1993, opening in 1994 for passenger use. In late 2003 it was renovated and enlarged from a few hundred square metres in area to about 3,800 m^{2} (41,000 sq ft). Shenzhen West railway station, originally known as Nantou railway station, is located on Xuefu Lu, Nanshan District. It is about 10 kilometers from Shekou Port. It was closed on October 11, 2022.

Intended to only ever be a freight-handling station for the nearby Shekou Port. Shenzhen West is now handling 45% of passenger traveling by rail to and from Shenzhen. It is a station that has evolved by necessity rather than design. Due to cramped platform space at the busy Shenzhen railway station, many long-distance services were introduced to Shenzhen West through the late 1990s and early 2000s, to cope with Shenzhen's rapidly growing migrant population. Shenzhen West railway station was expected to no longer operate as a passenger station once the new Shenzhen North railway station is finished, but it has remained open. This has been due to continued increasing public demand for cheap conventional rail services not supplied at the newer stations, built for newer, more expensive high speed trains.

== Train services ==
Thirteen trains arrive and depart from Shenzhen railway station daily. Passengers can take trains from here to 12 cities including Lanzhou, Tianjin, Chengdu, Nanjing, Hefei and Jinan. Most of the train tickets from here are a little cheaper than the tickets at Shenzhen railway station, as the facilities and services in this station, as well as the facilities and services on the slower conventional speed trains are not as good as in Shenzhen railway station.

== Transportation ==
In total there are 8 buses available at Shenzhen West railway station: Nos. 36, 58, 227, 229, 234, 353, B623 and B682.

Liyumen Station on Shenzhen Metro Line 1 is about 200m north of the station. It is offers connections directly between Shenzhen Bao'an International Airport and Luohu Station.

== Future ==
Many complaints about the poor facilities and dilapidated state of the station building have been made by the public and the operator. For example, the waiting hall lacks air conditioning. The Pingnan Railway company operating the station has applied for station renovation permits many times, but the government has vetoed plans because Shenzhen West railway station is not listed in the government's passenger railway network plan. In fact, government officials ordered the closure of the station in 2010 but it has continued operating, handling over 7 million in 2011 alone, according to Pingnan Railway records.

According to the network plan adopted in 2006, Shenzhen will only have five railway stations for passengers, including Shenzhen, Shenzhen North, Shenzhen East, Futian and Longgang (Pingshan) stations. All five stations are in eastern or central parts of the city.

Local support is calling for a major rail station to remain with in Nanshan, at Shenzhen West, especially with development plans to create a new Qianhai CBD area beside the harbour. It is also seen as a cheaper station for travel by many of the migrant workers living in Shenzhen, because it does not have many of the express or high speed services of other stations in Shenzhen, allowing for cheaper tickets.

It was announced in January 2013 that Shenzhen West railway station will get a long-awaited facelift, construction to begin in 2013 or 2014. After years of receiving criticism for its poor condition, station operator Pingnan Railway Co. said. The station will become an important terminal for the Shenzhen-Xiamen High-Speed Railway and inter-city rail between Pearl River Delta cities. The station is expected to handle 450,000 passengers during the 2013 Spring Festival holiday. Passengers have criticized its use of temporary freight sheds as waiting halls.

== Gallery ==
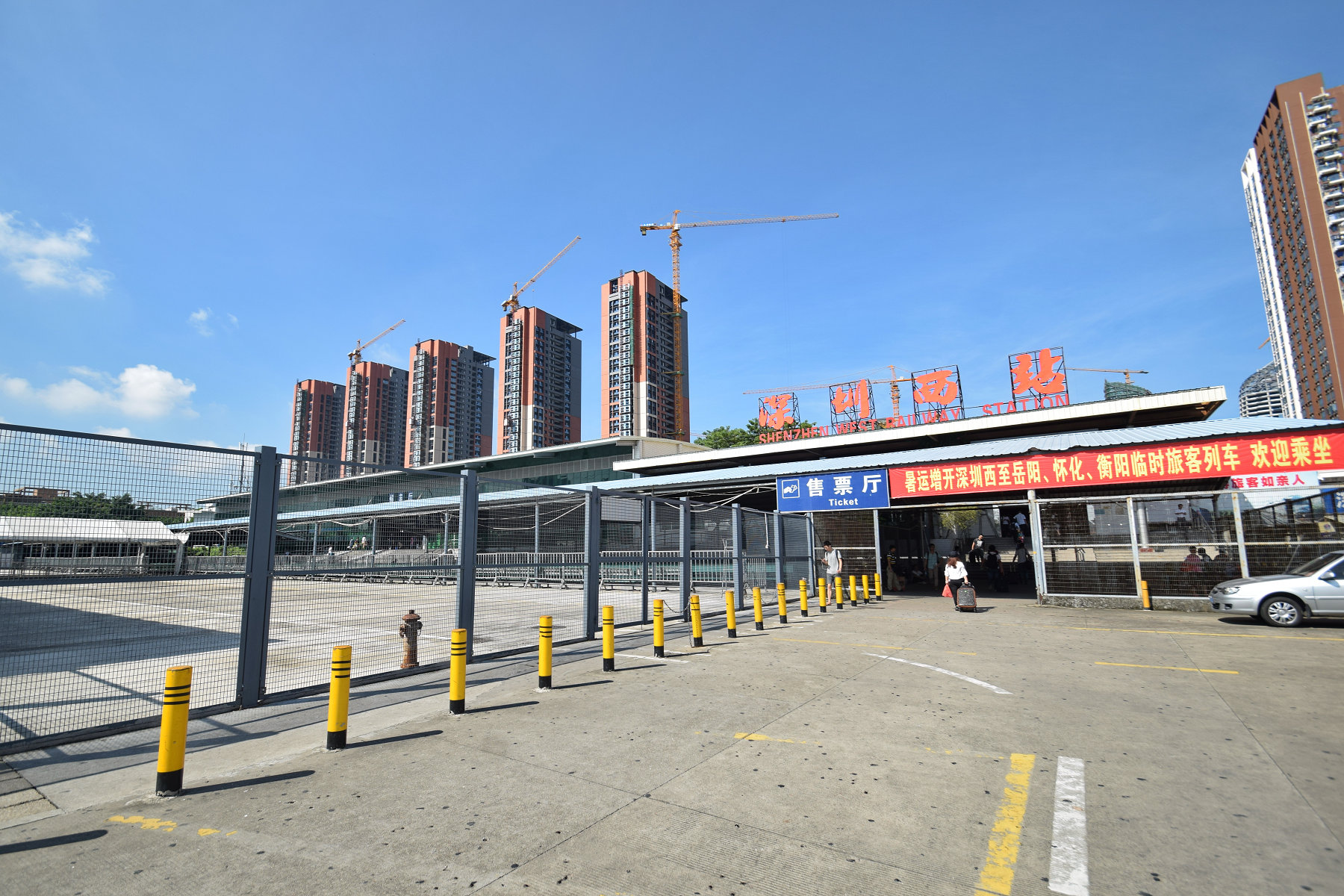

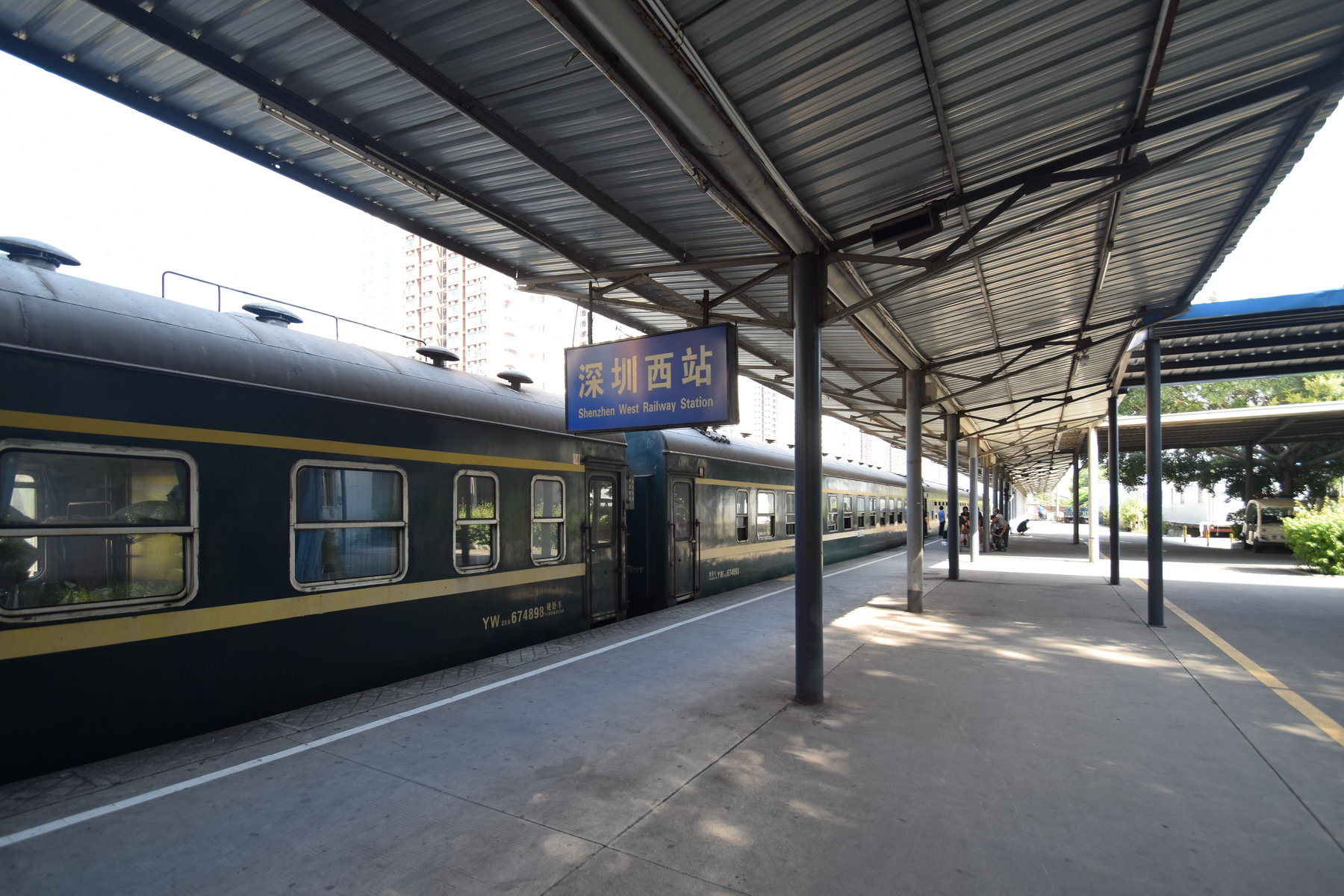

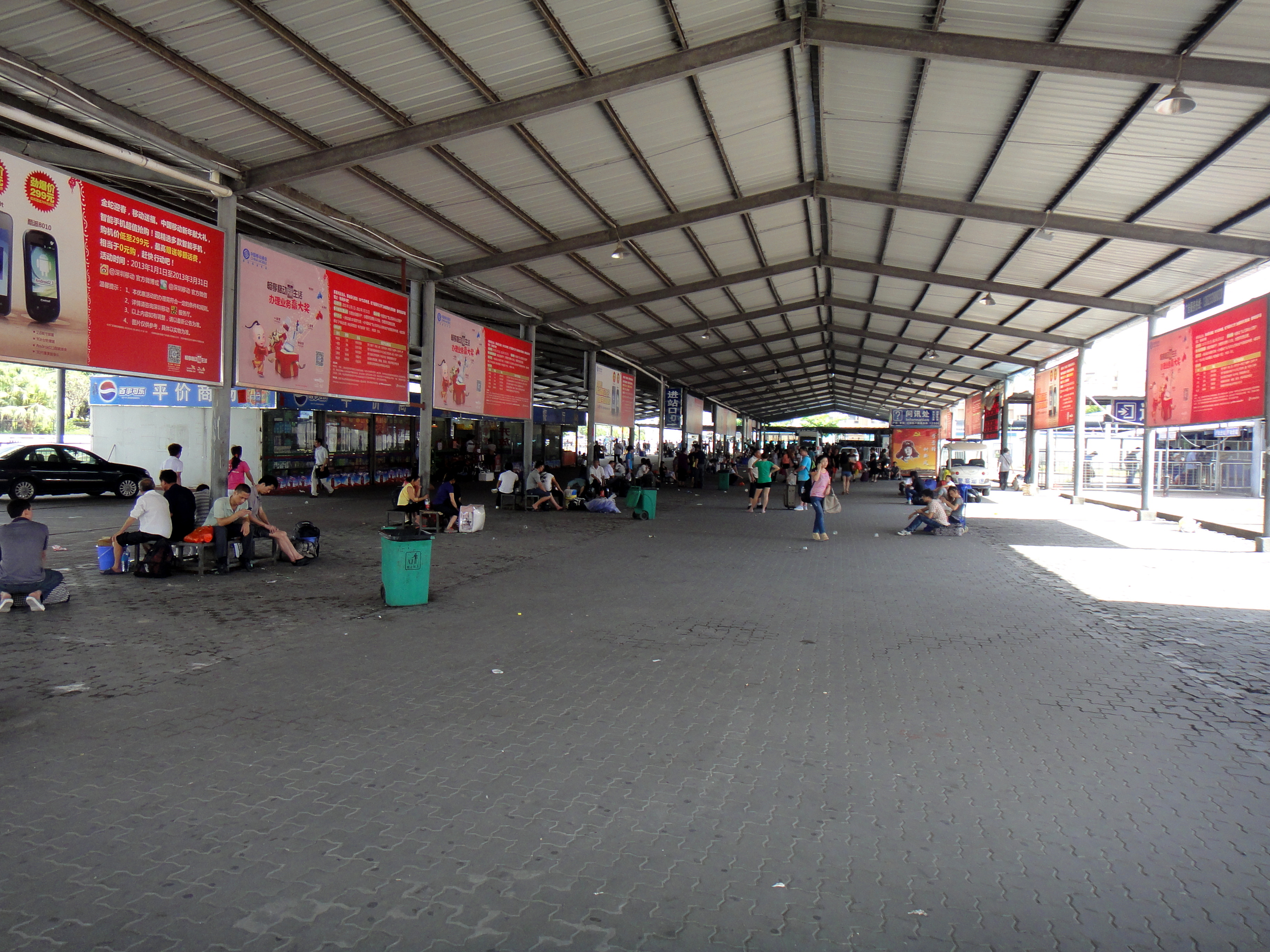
Passengers without tickets or waiting for their train time to come up have to wait in this undercover area.

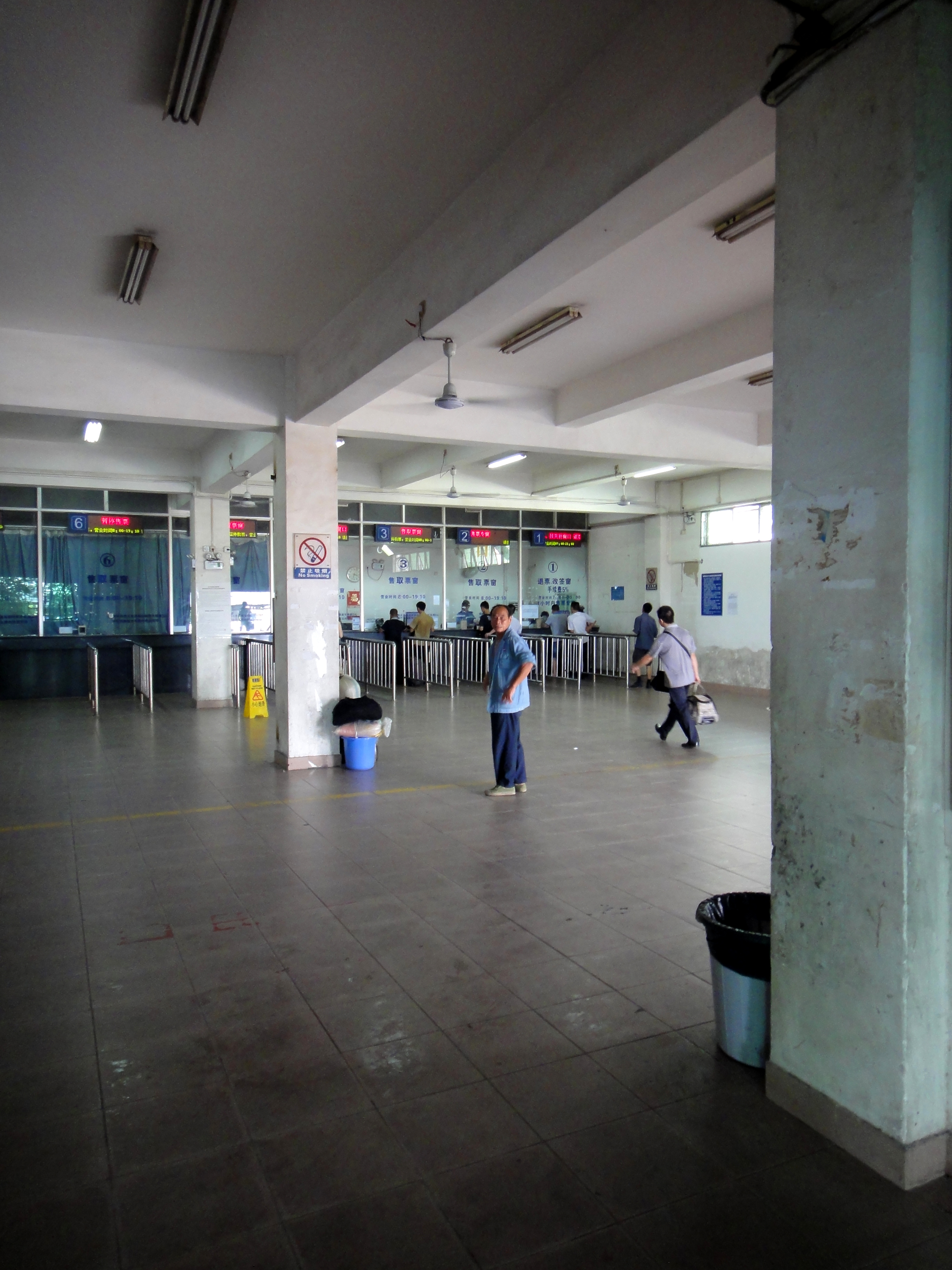
Ticket hall within Shenzhen West railway station

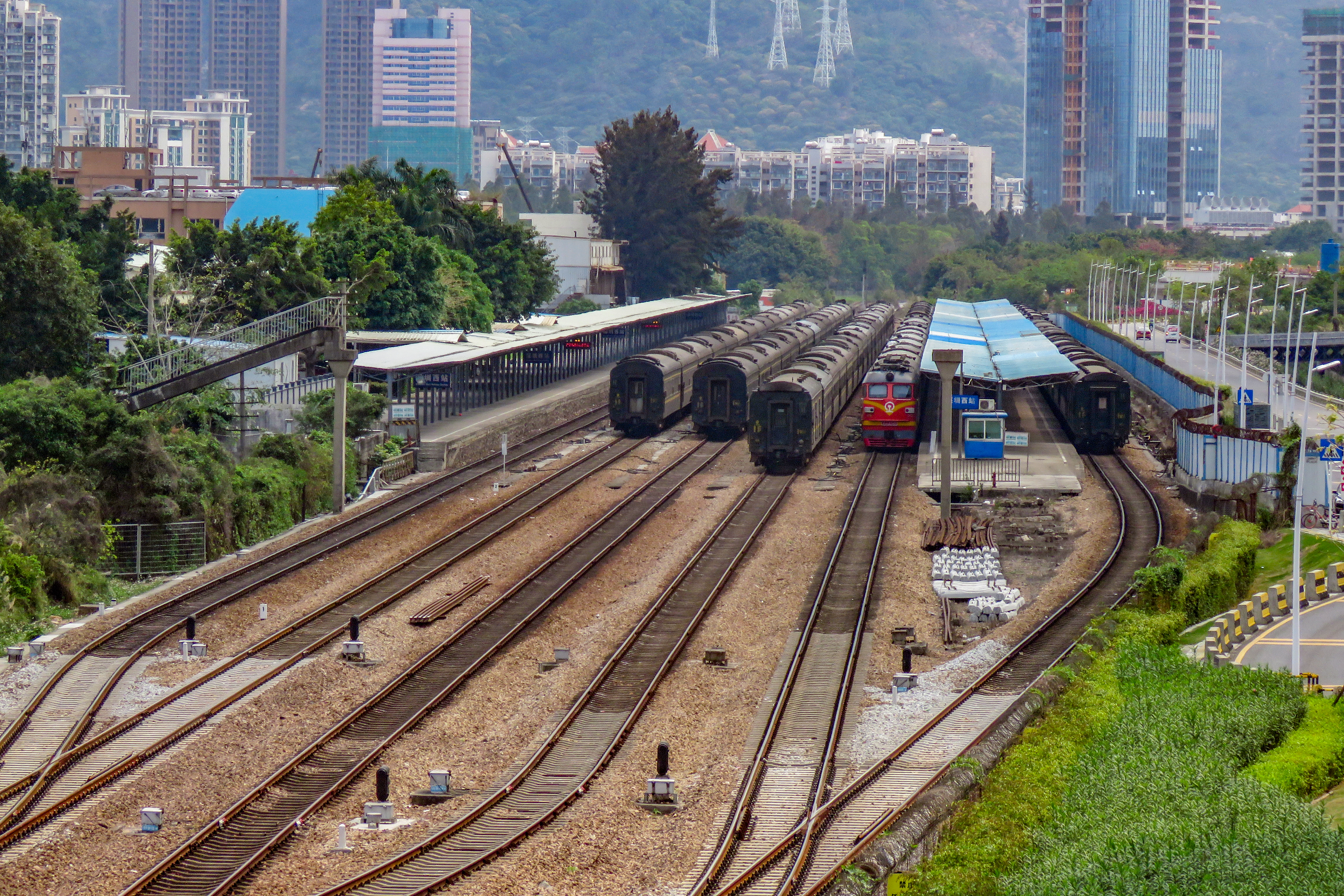

| Preceding station | China Railway | Following station |
|---|---|---|
| Xili towards Pinghu | Pinghu–Nanshan railway | Terminus |
Former
| Xili towards Pinghu | Pinghu–Nanshan railway | Mawan Terminus |
