= Line 29 (Shenzhen Metro) =

Future Shenzhen Metro line

- 29

Overview
- Status: Under construction
- Locale: Shenzhen, Guangdong
- Termini: Hongshuwan South; Xingdong (Phase 1) Future: Gongming
- Stations: 9 (Phase 1)

Service
- Type: Rapid transit
- System: Shenzhen Metro
- Services: 1
- Operator: SZMC (Shenzhen Metro Group)

History
- Planned opening: 2029; 3 years' time

Technical
- Line length: 11.3km (Phase 1)
- Character: Underground
- Operating speed: 80km/h

Line 29 of the Shenzhen Metro is a line under construction, which will connect the districts of Nanshan, Bao'an and Guangming for 30.6 kilometers and 24 stations. Construction began on 6 June 2024, and the line is expected to open in 2029. The first phase of Line 29 will run from Hongshuwan South in Nanshan District to Xingdong in Bao'an District, with 9 stations and 11.3 kilometers of track. The line is proposed to use 6 car type B trains.

== Stations (Phase 1) ==
Station name		Connections	Location
English	Chinese	Connections	Location
Hongshuwan South	红树湾南	9 11	Nanshan
Baishizhou	白石洲	1 20	Nanshan
Baishizhou North	白石洲北		Nanshan
Dashahe Park East	大沙河公园东		Nanshan
Zhuguang	珠光	7	Nanshan
Xili East	西丽东		Nanshan
Xili High Speed Railway Station	西丽高铁站	13 15 27; ELQ	Nanshan
Xili West	西丽西		Nanshan
Xingdong	兴东	5	Bao'an
