= Pinghu–Nanshan railway =

Railway line in Shenzhen, China

Pingnan railway or Pinghu–Nanshan railway is a railway line in Shenzhen connecting Pinghu with Nanshan. Freight and long-distance passenger train services are provided.

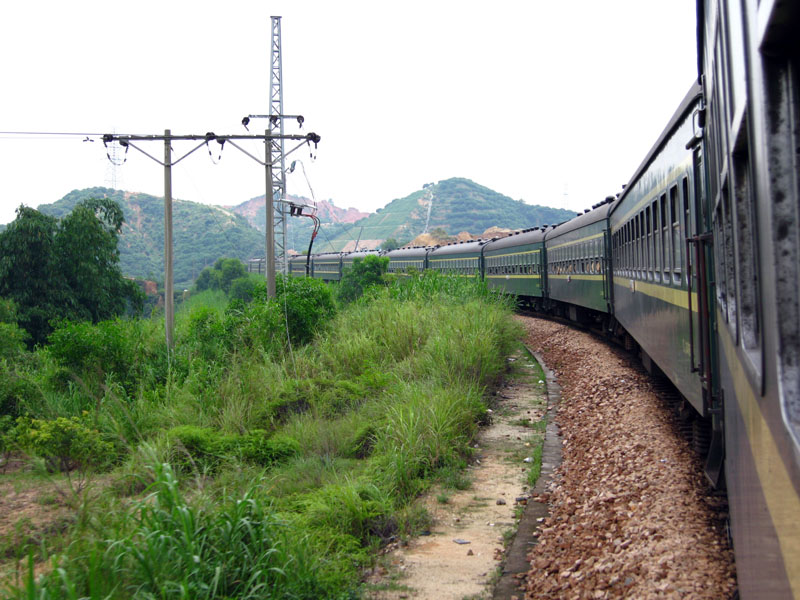
Passenger train on Pingnan railway

== Route ==
The line is 50.2 kilometres (31.2 mi) long with 8 stations, from Pinghu, where it is linked to Guangshen railway, to Shekou West or Mawan (which are on different branches). The entire line is single-track and built at 1,435 mm (4 ft 8 1/2 in) standard gauge. The maximum speed on the line is 75 kilometres per hour (47 mph). The line is not electrified, and therefore only diesel locomotives are used on the line.

== History ==
The railway was planned in the late 1980s to provide rail access for the Port of Shenzhen. It was the first railway in the People's Republic of China being built with both local and foreign capital. Construction of the Pingnan railway was approved in 1991 by the Chinese Government and commenced in September that year. In March 1993 part of the route was opened for trial operation. The entire line was opened in September 1994 and included into the national railway network.

== Locomotives ==
- DF11
- DF4B/D
- DF4

== Rolling stock ==
- 25G
- 25B

== Stations ==
| Name | Chinese name | Grade | Location | Distance from Pinghu in Kilometres | Notes |
|---|---|---|---|---|---|
| Pinghu | 平湖 | 4 | Longgang District, Shenzhen | 0 | Guangshen railway, Pingyan railway |
| Mugu | 木古 | 4 | Longgang District | 3 | |
| Bantian | 坂田 | 4 | Longgang District | 17 | Closed in 2013 |
| Tanglang | 塘朗 | n/a | Nanshan District | ? | Proposed; located near Tanglang Depot of the Shenzhen Metro |
| Xili | 西丽 | 4 | Nanshan District, Shenzhen | 28 | |
| Shenzhen West | 深圳西 | 1 | Nanshan District | 35 | Passenger station |
| Mawan | 妈湾 | 4 | Nanshan District | 40.4 | Closed in 2016. |
| Chiwan | 赤湾 | 4 | Nanshan District | 44 | Closed in 2005. |
| Shekou West | 蛇口西 | 4 | Nanshan District | 41.1 | Closed in 2016. On a separate branch from Shenzhen West Station; Located near Chiwan Station of Shenzhen Metro |

== See also ==
- List of railways in China
