= Shenzhen–Huizhou intercity railway =

Railway line in Guangdong, China

Overview
- Native name: 深惠城际铁路
- Status: Under planning
- Stations: 11 (initial Shenzhen section)

Service
- Type: Heavy rail

Technical
- Track gauge: 1,435 mm (4 ft 8 1/2 in) standard gauge
- Electrification: 50 Hz 25,000 V

The Shenzhen–Huizhou intercity railway, (Chinese: 深惠城际铁路) or Shenhui ICR, is an intercity railway being planned by the Shenzhen Metro. It is part of the Pearl River Delta Metropolitan Region intercity railway network. This is not to be confused with the Shenzhen–Dayawan intercity railway which is a parallel line that is also under planning but will connect Shenzhen to Huiyang District in southern Huizhou. The Huizhou section is being planned and owned by Huizhou as part of its own urban rail transit network. On November 30, 2020, Heyuan's local government is proposing the line be further extended north east of Huizhou to Heyuan.

The mainline of the Shenzhen-Huizhou Intercity Railway is planned to go from Qianbao Station to Lilin North Station, passing through Bao'an District, Longhua District, Longgang District, Fenggang Town of Dongguan City and Huicheng District of Huizhou City. There are 11 stations, starting from Qianbao Station and ending at Pingdi Station. In addition, the Dapeng branch line starts from Longcheng Station and ends at Xinda Station with 6 stations. The feasibility study for the branch line has passed the expert evaluation meeting in 2020.

The line will connect to the Dongguan–Huizhou intercity railway at Lilin North Station, with provisions to extend to Huidong County. The total length of the line is 141.927 km. The Qianhaiwan-Pingde section in Shenzhen is the initial section of the route to be constructed. The initial section is 58.809 km long and has 11 stations. The project has an expected cost of 51.75 billion RMB.

In 2020, bidding for survey and initial design for the section from Qianbao to Lilin North between Shenzhen and Huizhou Intercity is announced. On October 30, the Huizhou Municipal Government announced that because the project has a great impact on Huizhou's construction of a modern comprehensive transportation hub, it needs to conduct in-depth analysis on the lines impacts to the city. Therefore, the Shenzhen section of the Shenzhen-Huizhou Intercity Railway shall be implemented first with reservations for the Huizhou section to be implemented later.

On June 8, 2021, the feasibility study report for the inner section of Shenzhen was approved by the Shenzhen Development and Reform Commission.
