= Shenzhen East railway station =

Railway station in Shenzhen, Guangdong, China

Shenzhendong 深圳东
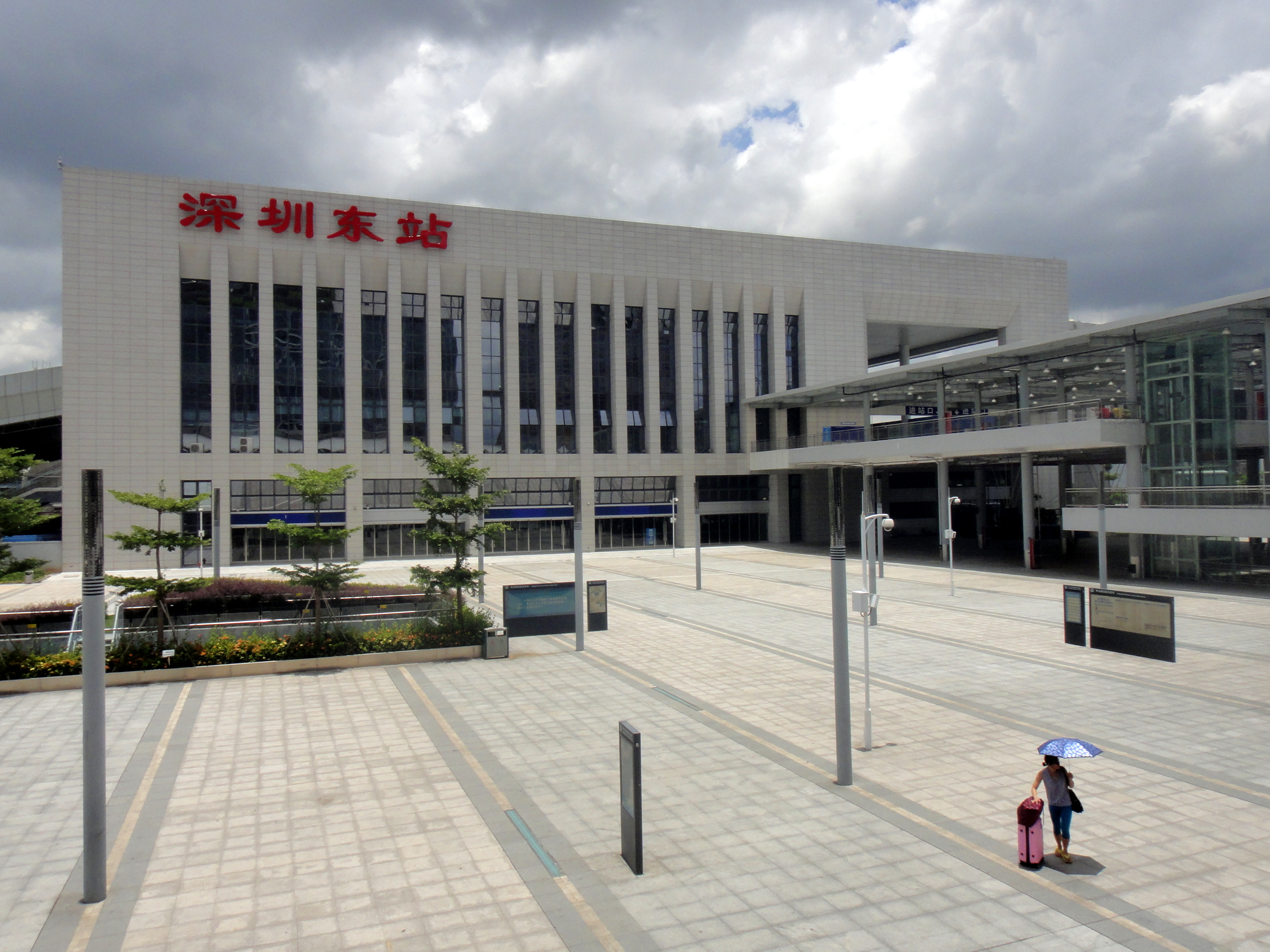

Chinese name
- Simplified Chinese: 深圳东站
- Traditional Chinese: 深圳東站
Transcriptions
Standard Mandarin
- Hanyu Pinyin: Shēnzhèndōng Zhàn
Yue: Cantonese
- Yale Romanization: Sām jan dūng Jaahm
- Jyutping: sam1 zan3 dung1 zaam6

Chinese name (Buji Station)
- Chinese: 布吉站
Transcriptions
Standard Mandarin
- Hanyu Pinyin: Bùjí Zhàn
Yue: Cantonese
- Yale Romanization: Bou gāt Jaahm
- Jyutping: bou3 gat1 zaam6

General information
- Other names: Shenzhen East
- Location: Longgang District, Shenzhen, Guangdong; China
- Coordinates: 22°36′14″N 114°06′52″E
- Operator: China Railway Corporation
- Lines: Guangzhou–Shenzhen Railway; Beijing–Kowloon Railway
- Platforms: 11 (5 island platforms, 1 side platform)

History
- Opened: 1911, 2012 (current station building)
- Former names: Buji

Services
Preceding station	China Railway	Following station
Pinghu towards Guangzhou	Guangzhou–Shenzhen railway	Sungang towards Shenzhen
Pinghu towards Beijing West	Beijing–Kowloon railway	Sungang towards Hung Hom
Location

Shenzhendong (East) railway station (simplified Chinese: 深圳东站; traditional Chinese: 深圳東站; pinyin: Shēnzhèndōng Zhàn), formerly Pu Kut station and Buji station (布吉站), is located in Buji Subdistrict, Longgang District, Shenzhen, in Guangdong. It is a station on the Guangzhou–Shenzhen Railway.

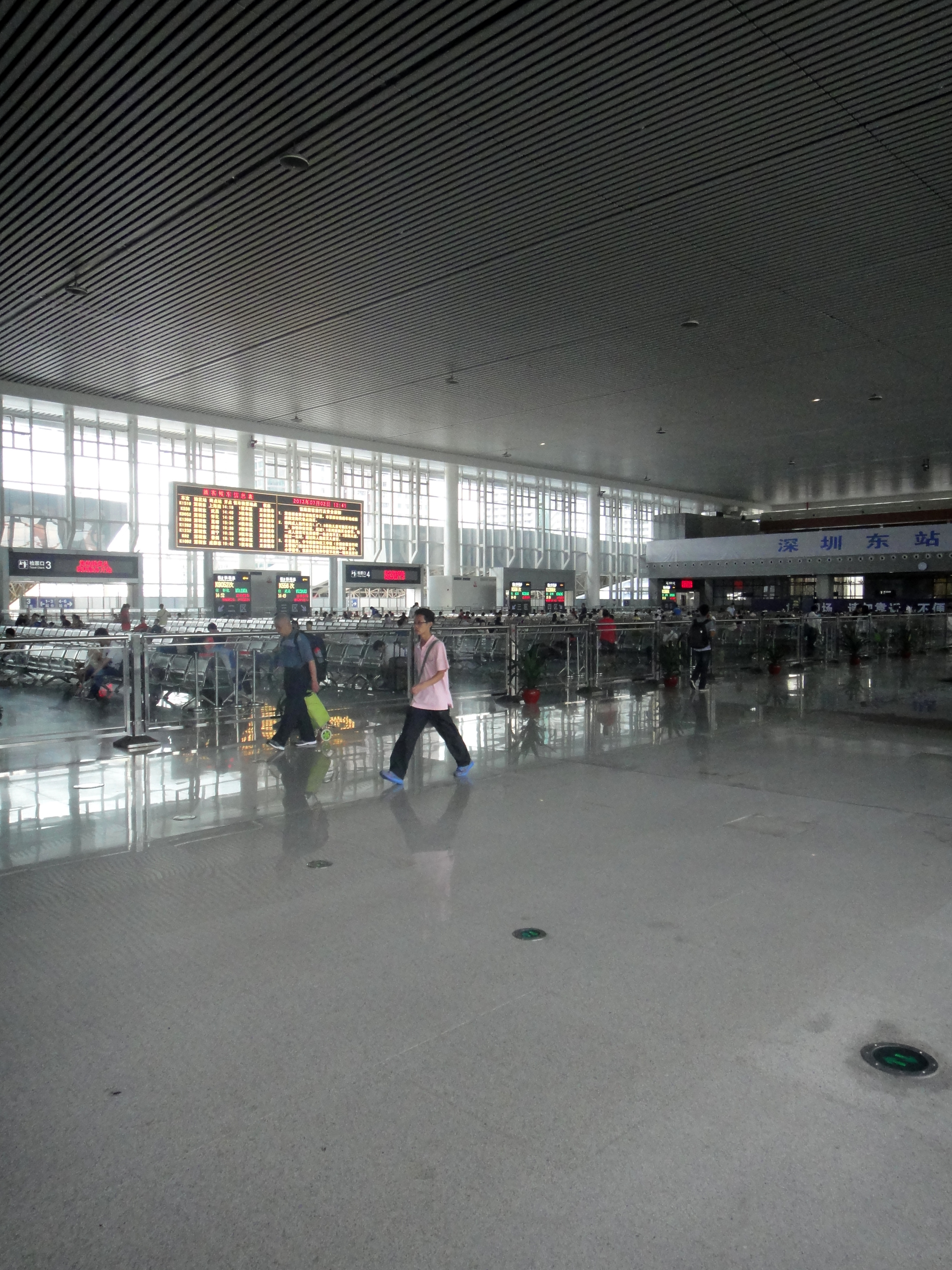
Waiting Hall for Shenzhen East railway station

== History ==
The station opened in 1911 as a freight and Level 3 passenger station (三等站) on the Kowloon–Canton Railway. Initial renovation works commenced in 2004. The station building was demolished in April 2008, and work began on the construction of a new passenger hub that was completed by the end of October 2012.

In September 2012, it was announced that the new station would be named "Shenzhen East Station". The Shenzhen East name was originally assigned to a proposed Longgang Station on the Xiamen–Shenzhen Railway, currently named Shenzhen Pingshan Station.

== Structure ==
The renovated station began operating 21 December 2012. The 127,000-square-meter hub houses the Guangzhou-Shenzhen Railway, serving 3 separate railway lines (2 high-speed lines and 1 conventional rail line). The completed station building features 3 ticket halls and a waiting hall of 7,100m^{2}. There are 6 north-south platforms serving 11 tracks on the main platform level. Separate east-west platforms will serve trains on the Xiamen-Shenzhen High-Speed Railway (u/c). The station is adjacent to Buji Station on the Shenzhen Metro, served by Line 3, Line 5 and Line 14.

== Train services ==
C8004, a Guangzhou–Shenzhen Railway intercity train, is passing through Shenzhen East railway station without stopping.

The new Shenzhen East will handle middle- and long-distance, lower-speed trains, including trains to Sichuan, Hunan, Hubei, Jiangxi and Anhui provinces. Shenzhen railway station will be the main hub for intercity trains in Guangdong Province, for example, and its current long-distance trains to Beijing, Shanghai, Chengdu, Guilin and Fuzhou will be relocated to Shenzhen East in the future.

This station was initially designed for stopping by Guangzhou–Shenzhen Railway intercity trains but the plan was abandoned after construction was nearly completed, and Pinghu has become the additional station for intercity trains afterwards.

Shenzhen East station is now mainly used for non-high-speed services, while starting 10 January 2024, a pair of regularly operating "D-prefix" train, namely D146/7 and D148/5, heading to Zhengzhou station is added where CR200J1-C trains are in use as of January 2024.
