= Shenzhen railway station =

Railway station in Shenzhen, Guangdong, China

Shenzhen 深圳
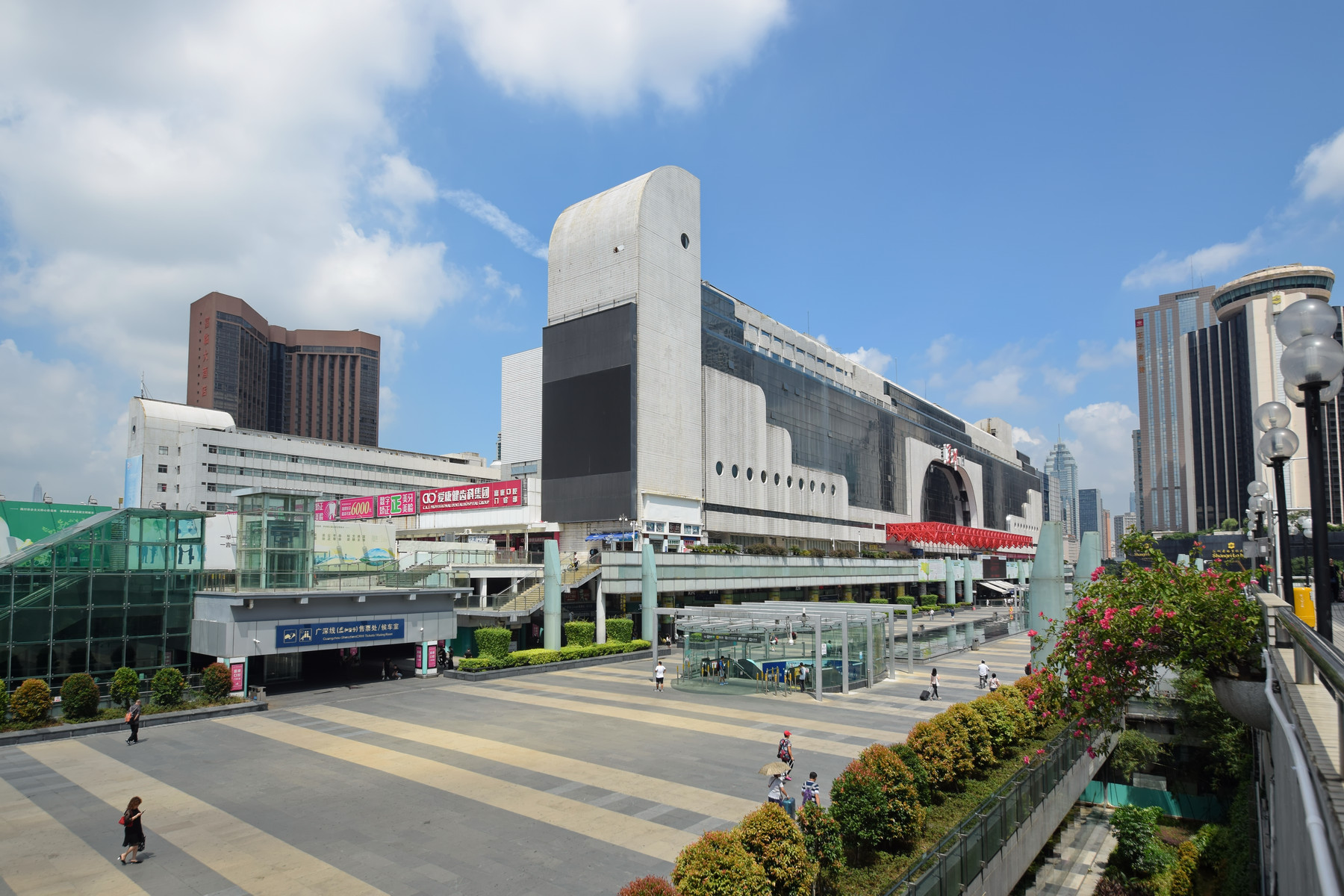

General information
- Location: Jianshe Road, Nanhu Subdistrict, Luohu District, Shenzhen, Guangdong; China
- Coordinates: 22°32′04″N 114°06′44″E
- Operator: Guangshen Railway Company; CR Guangzhou
- Lines: Guangshen Railway; Jingjiu Railway
- Platforms: 6 (2 island platforms and 2 side platforms)
- Tracks: 8 (2 non-stop)
- Connections: Line 1 (Luohu); Line 9 (Renmin South); East Rail line (Lo Wu); Bus terminal

Construction
- Structure type: At grade

Other information
- Station code: SZQ (China Railway Telegram Code); SZH (China Railway Pinyin Code)

History
- Opened: 8 October 1911; 115 years ago (original station); 1950; 76 years ago (first station at current site); 1990; 36 years ago (current station building)

Services
Preceding station	China Railway	Following station
Sungang towards Guangzhou	Guangzhou–Shenzhen railway	Terminus
Sungang towards Beijing West	Beijing–Kowloon railway	Terminus
Location

Shenzhen railway station
- Chinese: 深圳站
Transcriptions
Standard Mandarin
- Hanyu Pinyin: Shēnzhèn Zhàn
Yue: Cantonese
- Jyutping: sam1 zan3 zaam6

Luohu railway station
- Simplified Chinese: 罗湖站
- Traditional Chinese: 羅湖站
Transcriptions
Standard Mandarin
- Hanyu Pinyin: Luóhú Zhàn
Yue: Cantonese
- Jyutping: lo4 wu4 zaam6

Shenzhen railway station (Chinese: 深圳站; pinyin: Shēnzhèn zhàn, formerly Shum Chun station), also unofficially known as Luohu railway station (Chinese: 罗湖站; pinyin: Luóhú zhàn), is located across from Luohu Commercial City in Nanhu Subdistrict, Luohu District of Shenzhen, Guangdong. It is the southern terminus of the Guangzhou-Shenzhen Railway.

It is one of the two stations with high-speed rail service in Luohu District. The other station is Luohu North railway station, which is currently under construction on Shenzhen–Shanwei high-speed railway.

== History ==
Shenzhen railway station was first opened as Shumchun, as the last stop of the Chinese section of the Kowloon–Canton Railway on 8 October 1911. This station is situated in Dongmen, in what was then the market town of Shenzhen/Shum Chun. It was relocated near its current location on the China-Hong Kong border, opposite Lo Wu station, in 1950. However, the station was in turn demolished in 1983 but successively rebuilt and remodeled multiple times to its current scale.

== Location ==
The station is located just north of the boundary with Hong Kong in a north–south alignment. Moreover, the Guangshen Railway joins the East Rail line just south of the station, where Lo Wu station on the Hong Kong MTR is located. The Shenzhen Metro system has Luohu station nearby on a lower level and connected with Shenzhen railway station.

== Layout ==
West
West	Platform 4 (side platform)
West	Long Distance Trains (12)
West	Long Distance Trains (10)
West	Platform 3 (island platform)
West	Long Distance Trains (8)
West	←to Hong Kong——Through Trains (6)——to Guangzhou South→
West	Guangzhou-Shenzhen Intercity Services
West	Platform 2 (island platform)
West	Guangzhou-Shenzhen Intercity Services
West	Guangzhou-Shenzhen Intercity Services
West	Guangzhou-Shenzhen Intercity Services
East	Platform 1 (side platform)

== Train services ==
Shenzhen railway station will be the main hub for inter-city trains in Guangdong Province, for example, and some of its current long-distance trains to Beijing, Shanghai, Chengdu, Guilin and Fuzhou will be relocated to Shenzhen East railway station in the future. The higher-speed trains (up to 200 km/hour speed) between Shenzhen and Guangzhou/Guangzhou East railway station, however, will stay.

== Gallery ==
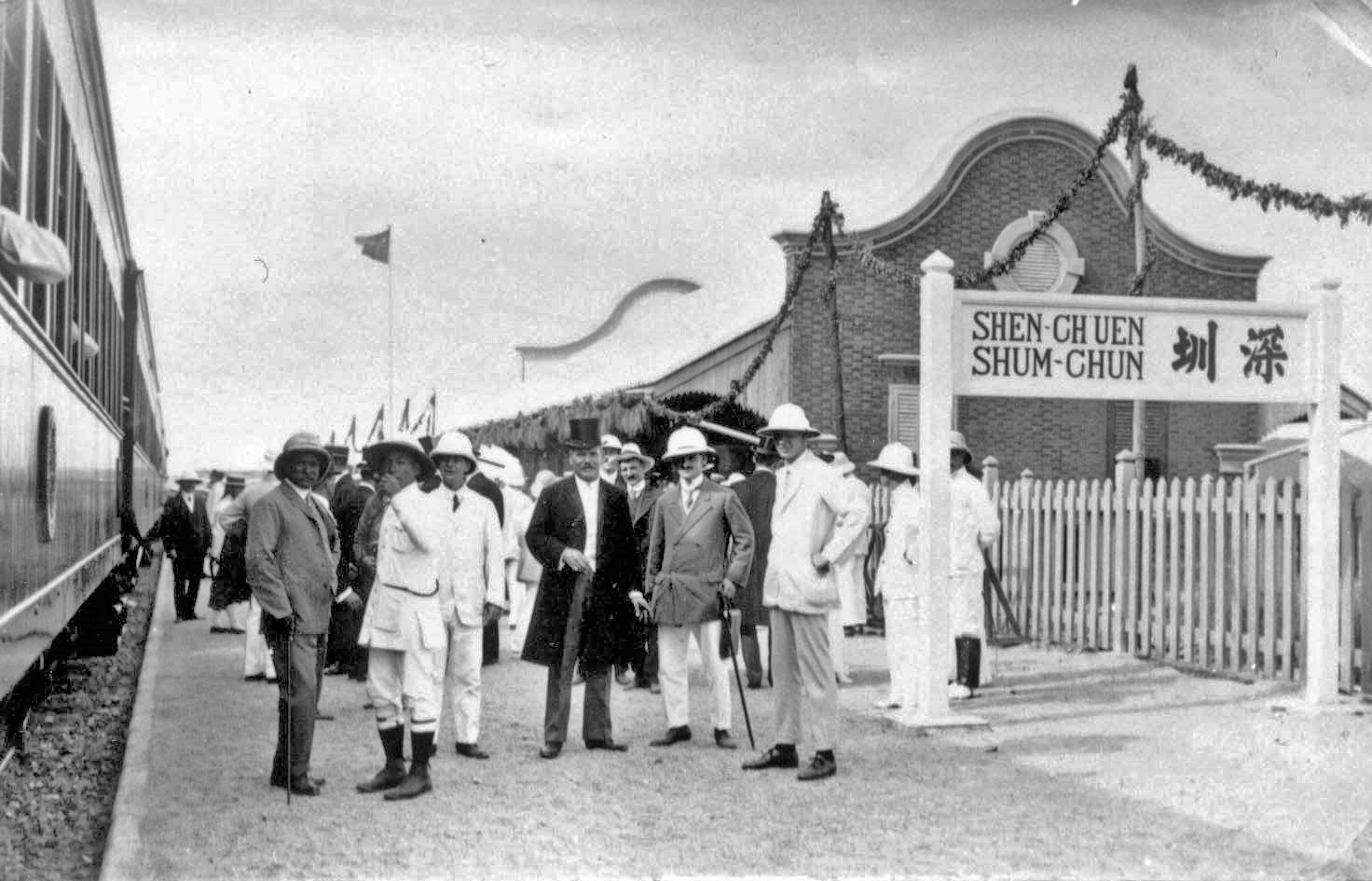
Opening of the original Shenzhen station, 1911

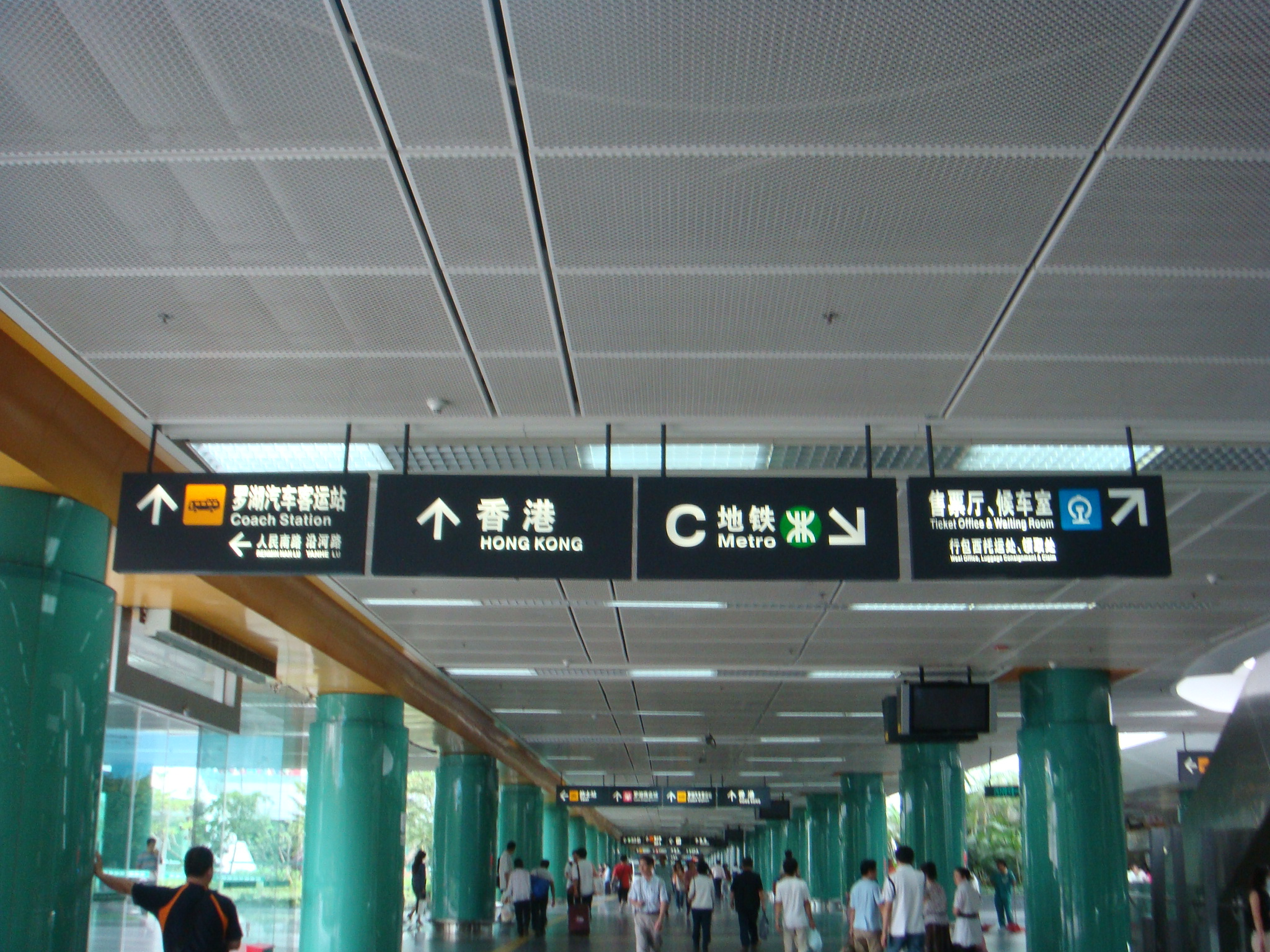
Sign directing passengers to in-station services, local transportation, and to Hong Kong

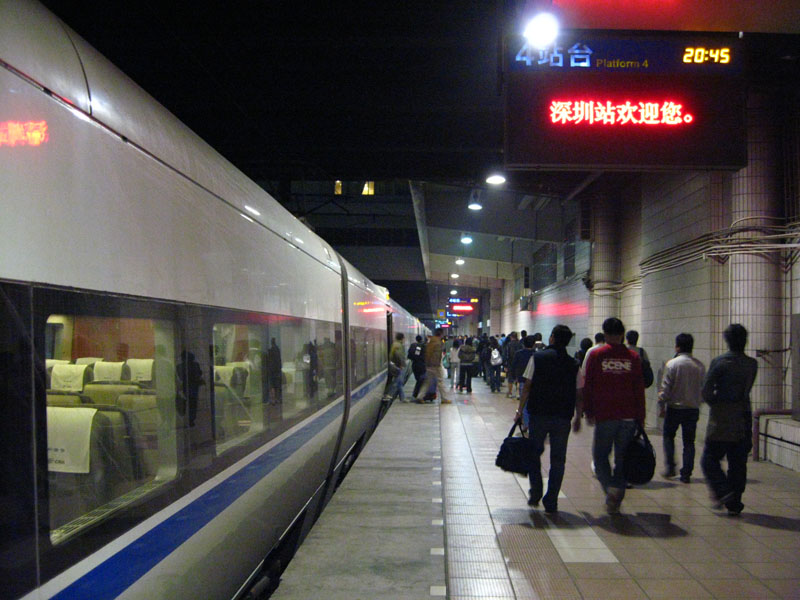
Trains in station area CRH1A

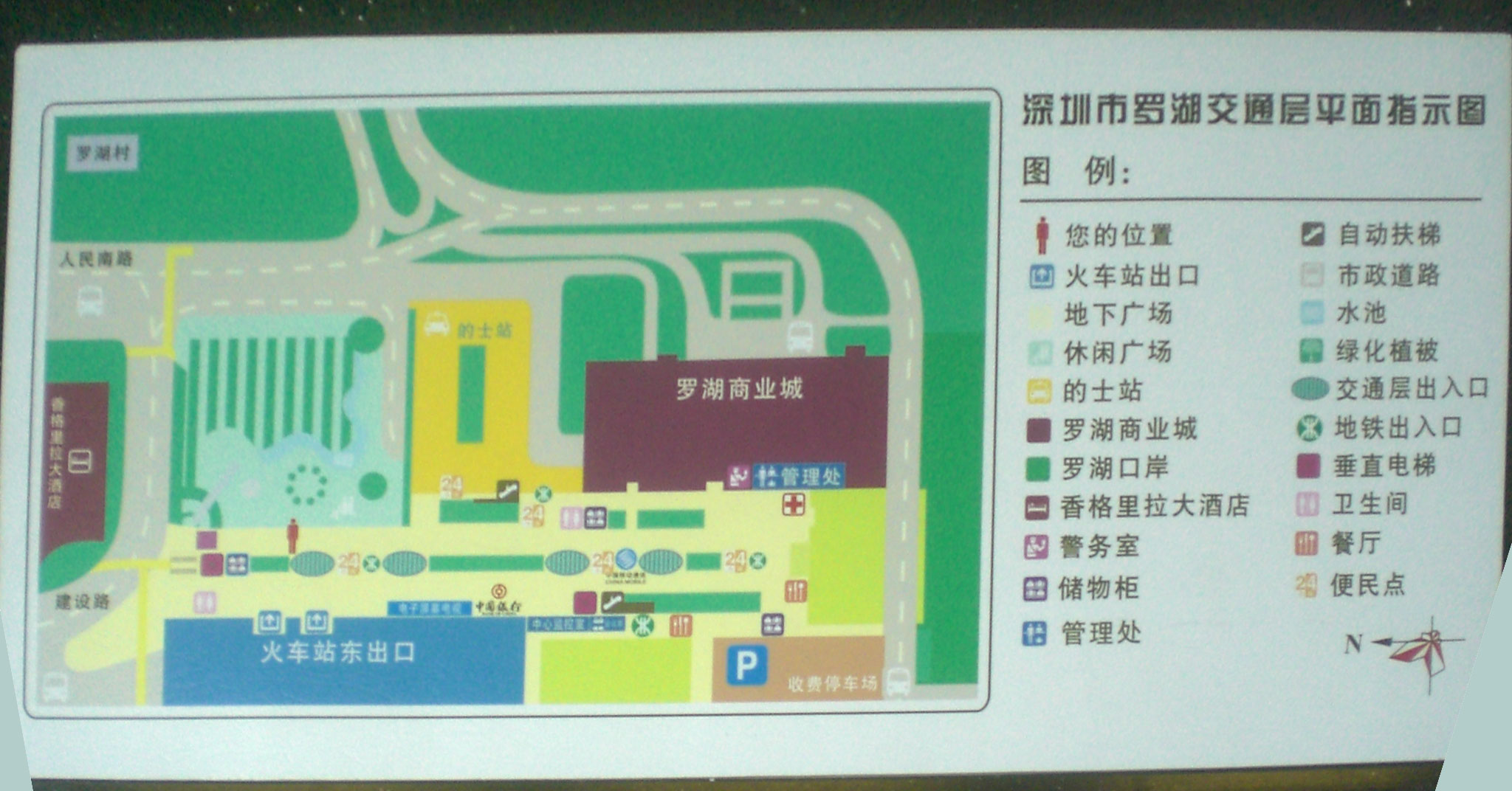
Shenzhen railway station area map

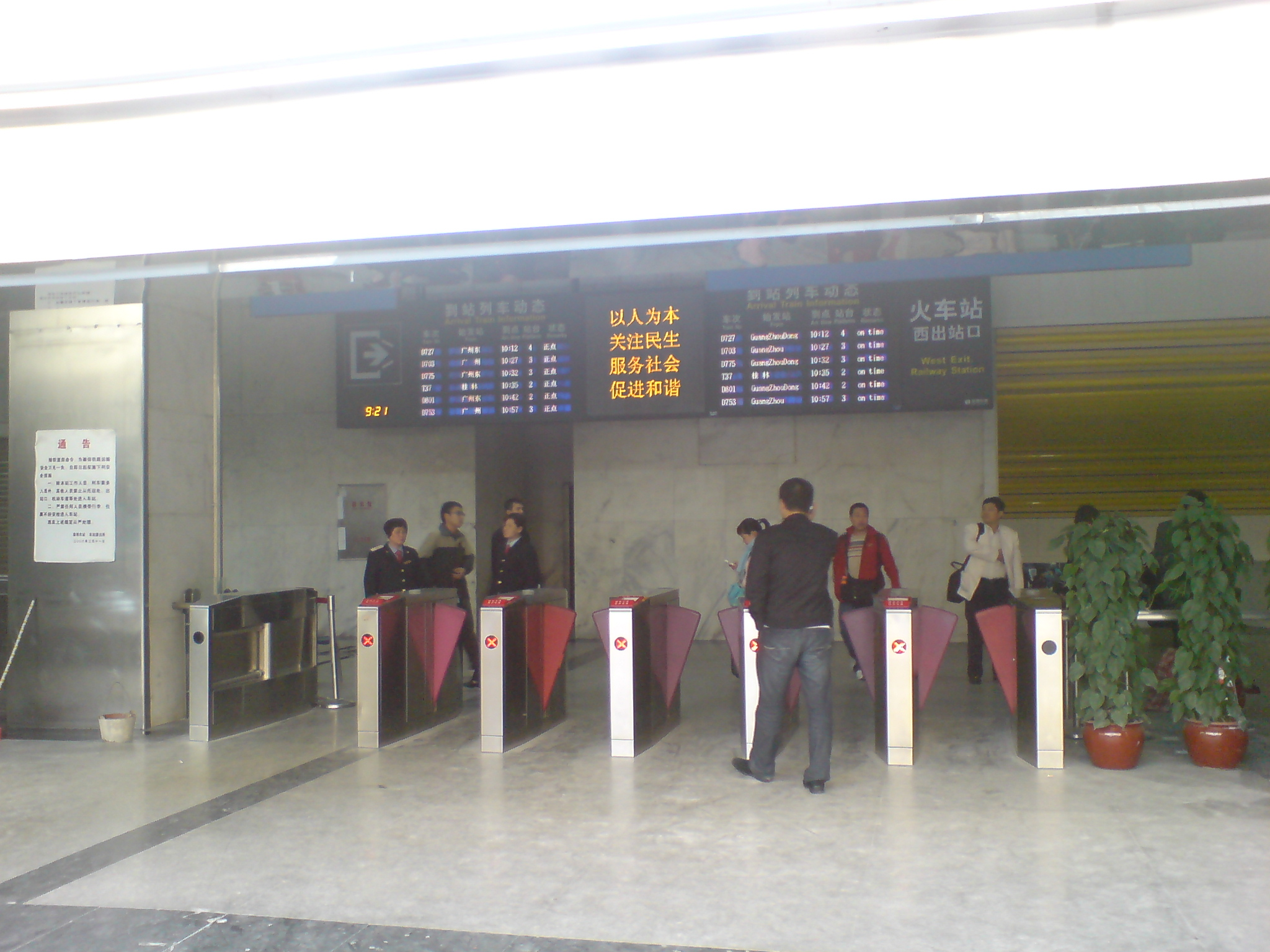
Shenzhen railway station Exit

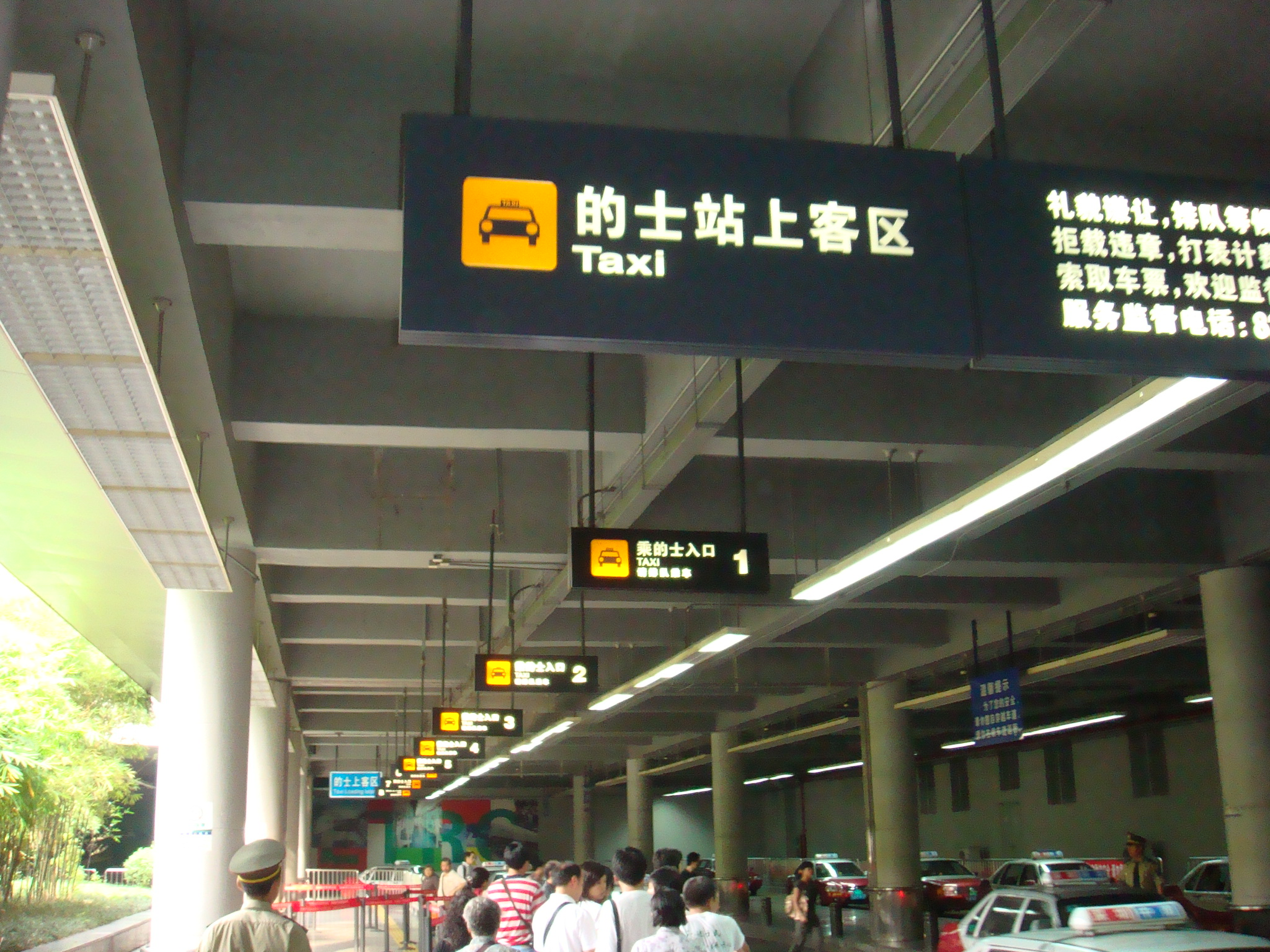
Taxi and bus terminal

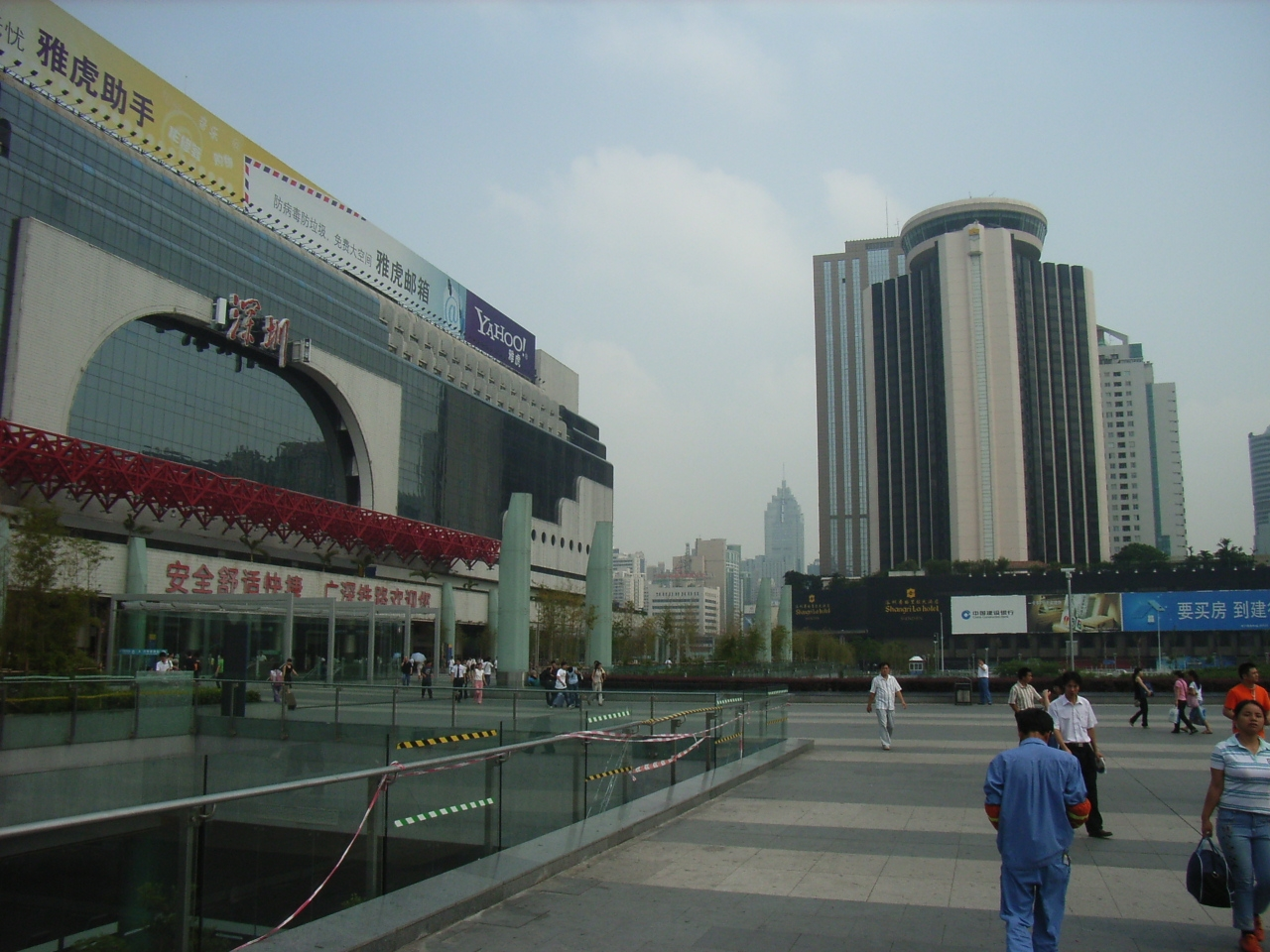
Shenzhen railway station and Shangri-La Hotel in background

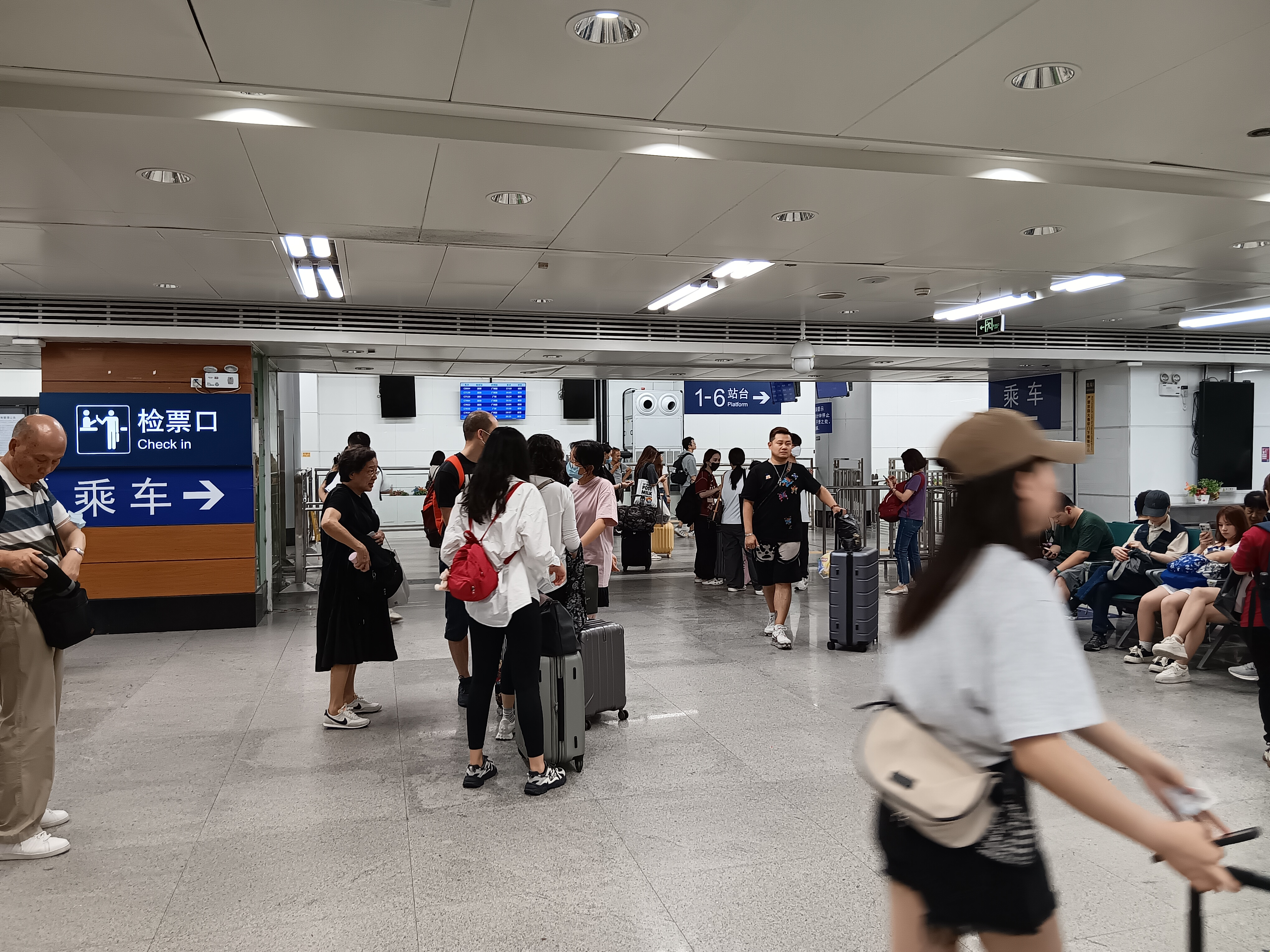
Waiting room for Guangzhou-Shenzhen intercity trains

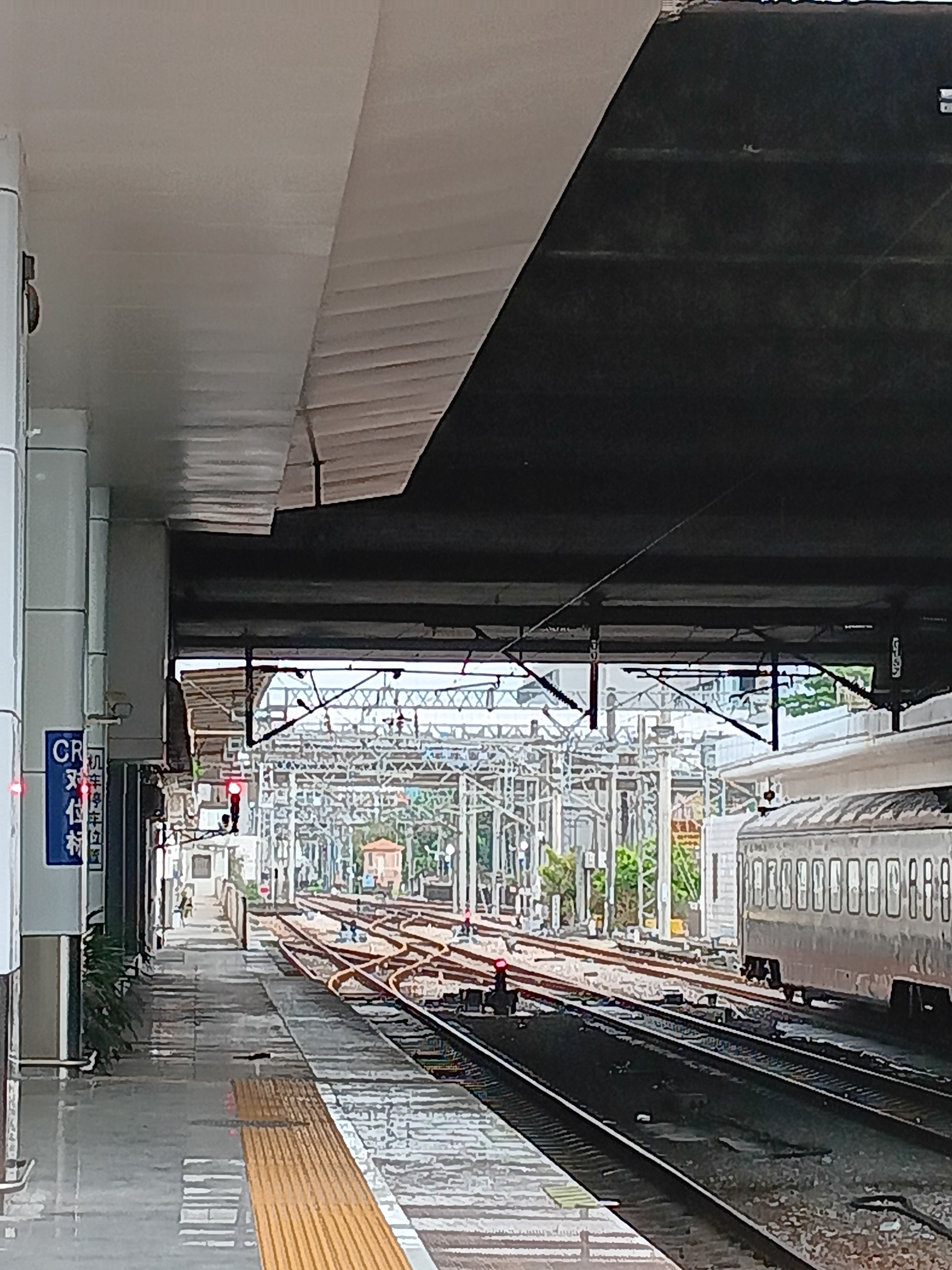
Through train tracks to Hong Kong

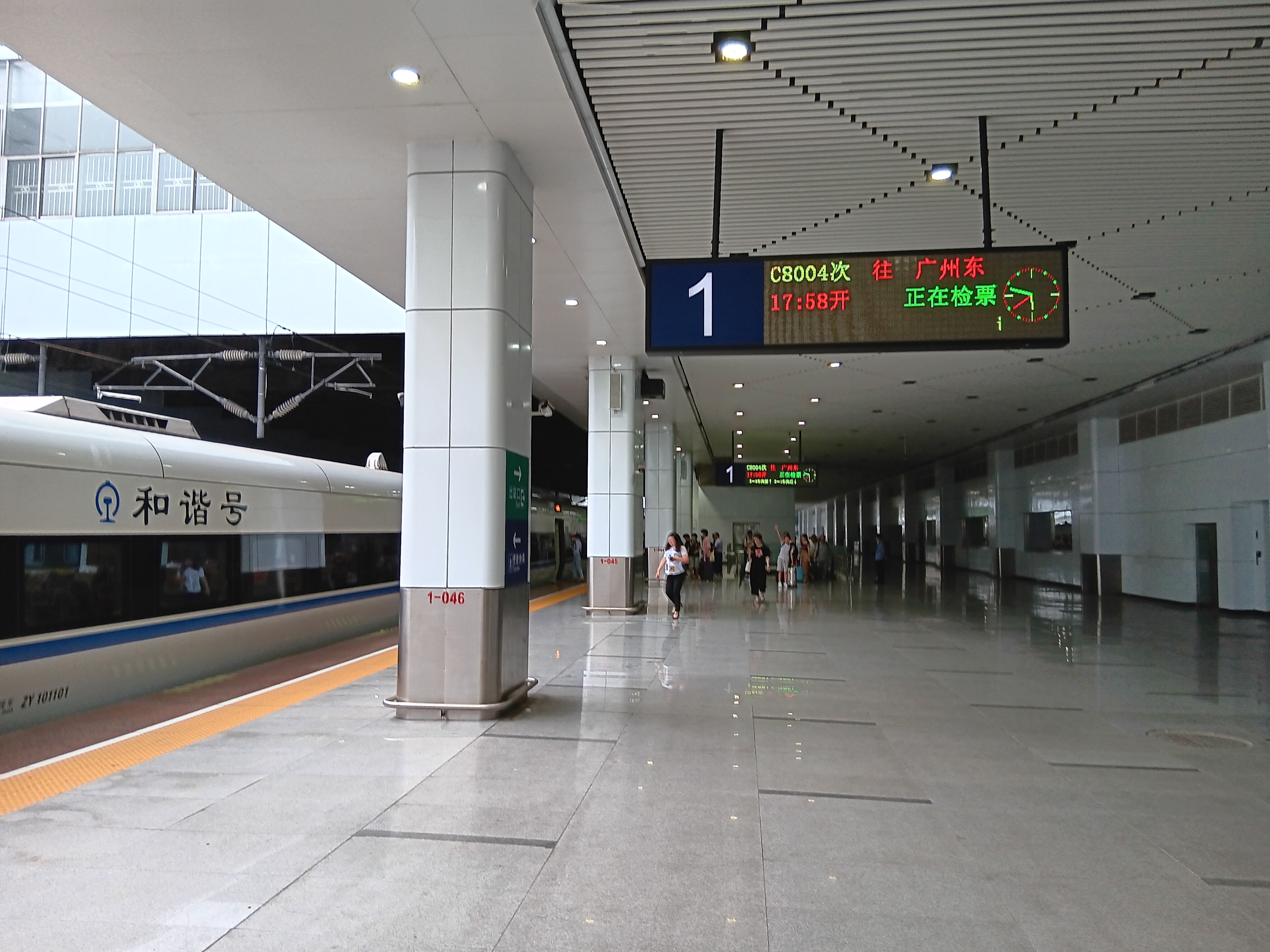
Platform 1

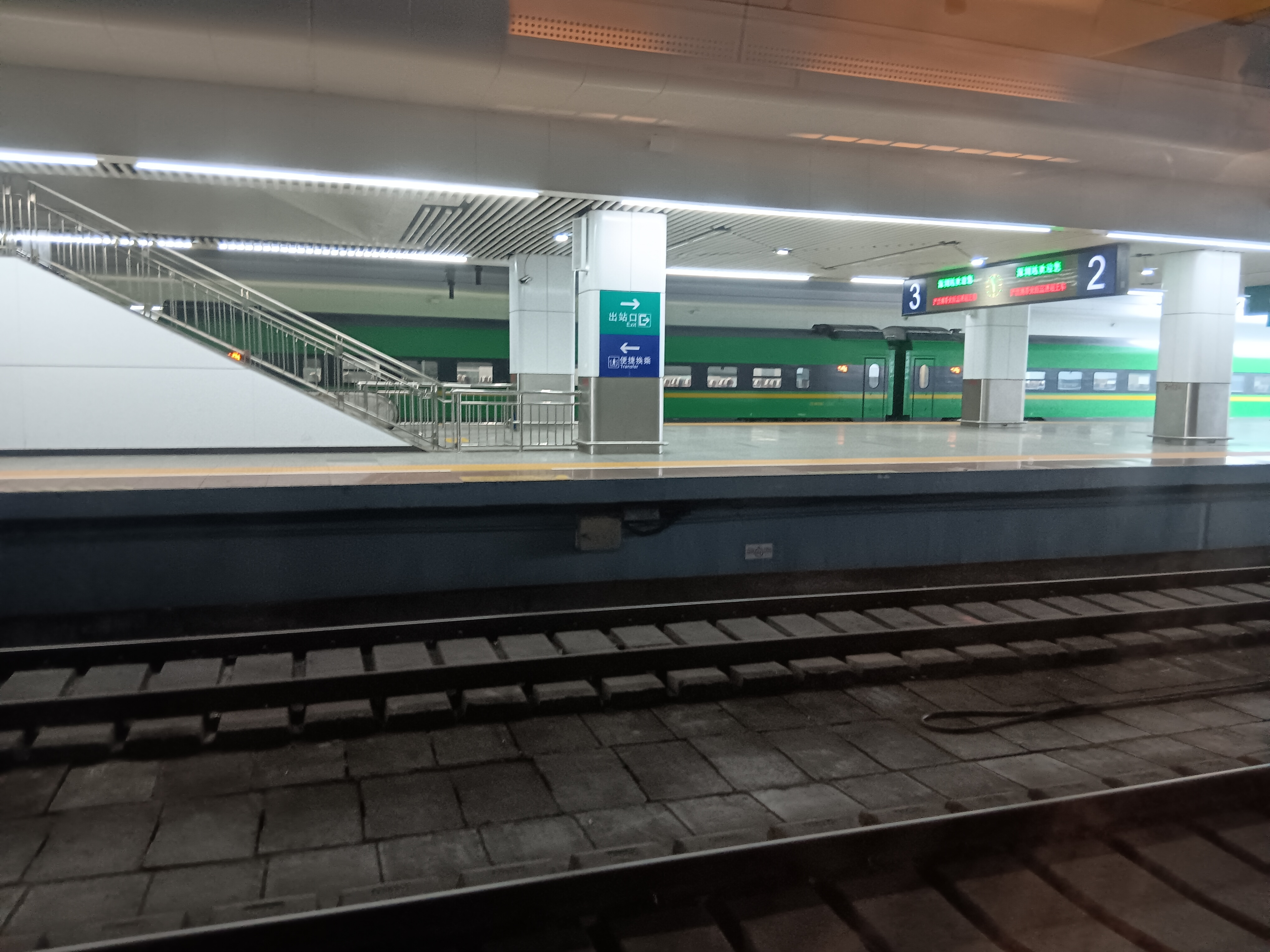
Platforms 2 and 3

C8004, a Guangzhou–Shenzhen railway intercity train, departs from platform 1
