= Shenzhen–Dayawan intercity railway =

Rail line in China

Overview
- Native name: 深大城际铁路
- Status: Under construction
- Termini: Shenzhen Airport North; Julong (initial section) / Dayawan (long-term plan)
- Stations: 11 (initial section); 14 (long-term plan)

Service
- Type: Regional rail, Heavy rail

Technical
- Line length: 69.06 km (42.91 mi) (initial section); 86.83 km (53.95 mi)
- Track gauge: 1,435 mm (4 ft 8 1/2 in) standard gauge
- Electrification: 50 Hz 25,000 V

The Shenzhen–Dayawan intercity railway (Chinese: 深大城际铁路), also known as Shenzhen Metro Line 33, is an under construction regional railway connecting Shenzhen and Huiyang District in southern Huizhou, in Guangdong Province, China.

== Description ==
The railway is part of the Pearl River Delta Metropolitan Region intercity railway network. It will run east–west, and have 14 stations. This is not to be confused with the Shenzhen–Huizhou intercity railway which is a parallel line that is also under construction but will connect Shenzhen to Huicheng District in northern Huizhou.

This railway allows from express connections with multiple subcenters in northern Shenzhen, Shenzhen Bao'an International Airport and Daya Bay area in Huizhou and at the same time alleviate increasing passenger congestion on Shenzhen Metro Line 5.

The first section of this line, an 86 kilometres (53 mi) long stretch from Shenzhen Bao'an International Airport to Shenzhen Pingshan railway station, started construction in 2022.

== History ==
On June 8, 2021, the feasibility study report for the line was approved by the Shenzhen Development and Reform Commission.

== Long-term plan ==
=== Extension to Dayawan ===
The extension from Julong railway station in Shenzhen to Dayawan railway station in Huizhou is part of long-term plan.

=== Connecting line ===
Zhongshan proposed a connection line south of Wanqingsha station, to allow Guangzhou Metro Line 18 to through operate into the Shenzhen–Dayawan intercity railway.
