= Pinghu railway station =

Railway station in Shenzhen, China

Coordinates: 22°41′41″N 114°07′12″E

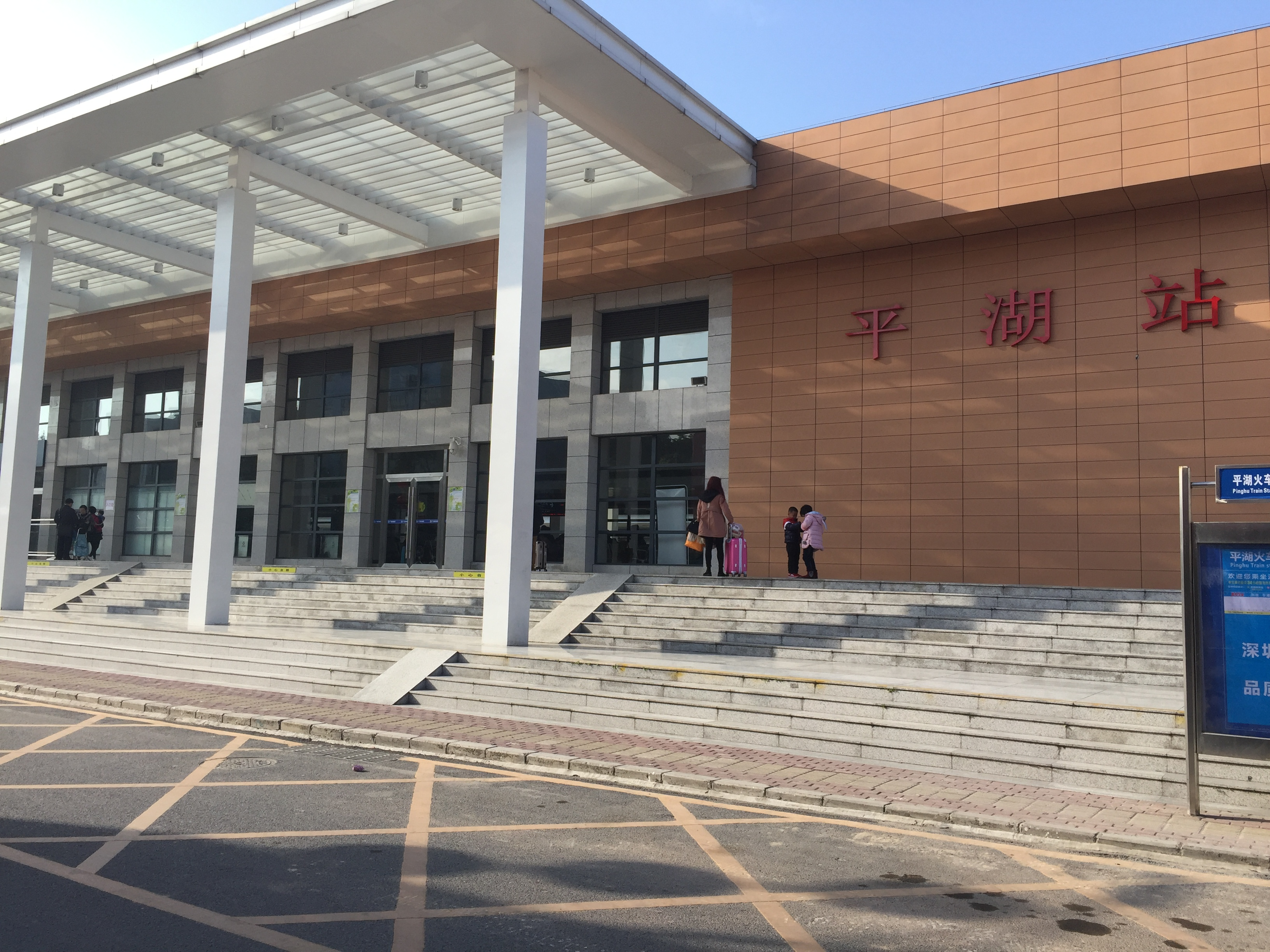
Front view of the Pinghu station 2017

Pinghu railway station, formerly Ping Wu station, serves the town of Pinghu, Shenzhen, Guangdong, China. It is a stop on the Guangzhou–Shenzhen railway, and also the termini of Pinghu–Nanshan railway and Pinghu–Yantian railway.

== History ==
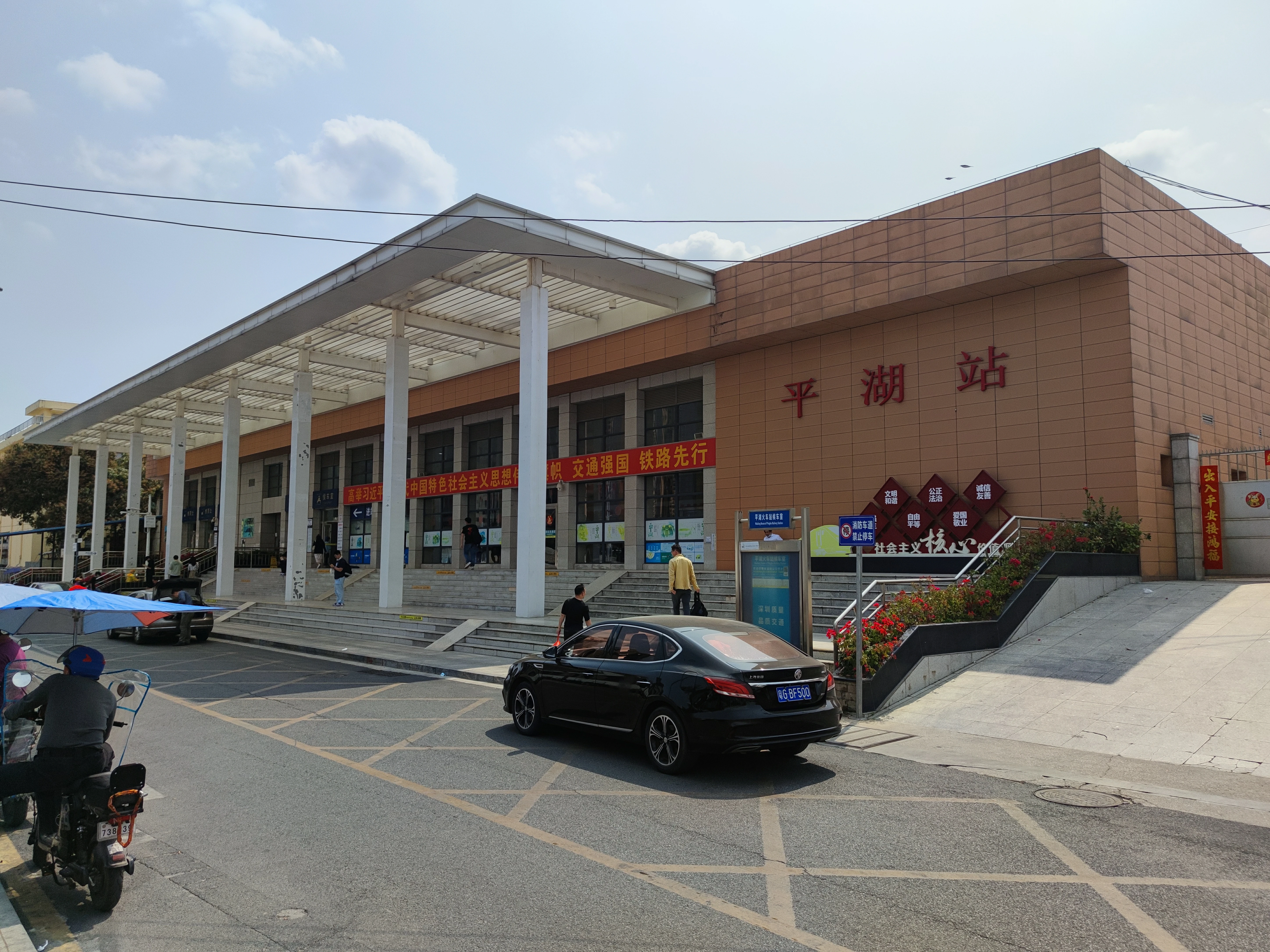
Pinghu Railway Exterior G 2023

The station was opened in 1911 as part of the Kowloon–Canton Railway Chinese Section, with trains running between Kowloon and Canton. The construction of the station was proposed by Hong Kong merchant Lau Chu-pak, whose family was from this town.

Since the China Railway speed-up campaign, the number of passenger trains stopping at Pinghu was decreasing, and was totally closed to passenger service since 2006 where the last stopping passenger train was cancelled.

It reopened following refurbishment on 26 September 2016. It is an intermediate station exclusively for CRH intercity trains on the Guangzhou–Shenzhen railway, conventional trains do not stop at this station.

Preceding station	China Railway	Following station
Tiantangwei towards Guangzhou	Guangzhou–Shenzhen railway	Shenzhen East towards Shenzhen
Tiantangwei towards Beijing West	Beijing–Kowloon railway	Shenzhen East towards Hung Hom
Terminus	Pinghu–Nanshan railway	Pinghu South towards Shenzhen West
Terminus	Pinghu–Yantian railway	Bailihang towards Yantian
