= SS8 =

SS8 may refer to:

- SS-8 Sasin, a Soviet intercontinental ballistic missile
- China Railways SS8, an electric locomotive
- USS Shark (SS-8), a submarine of the United States Navy
