= China Railways SS8 =

Chinese electric locomotive class

SS8 韶山8
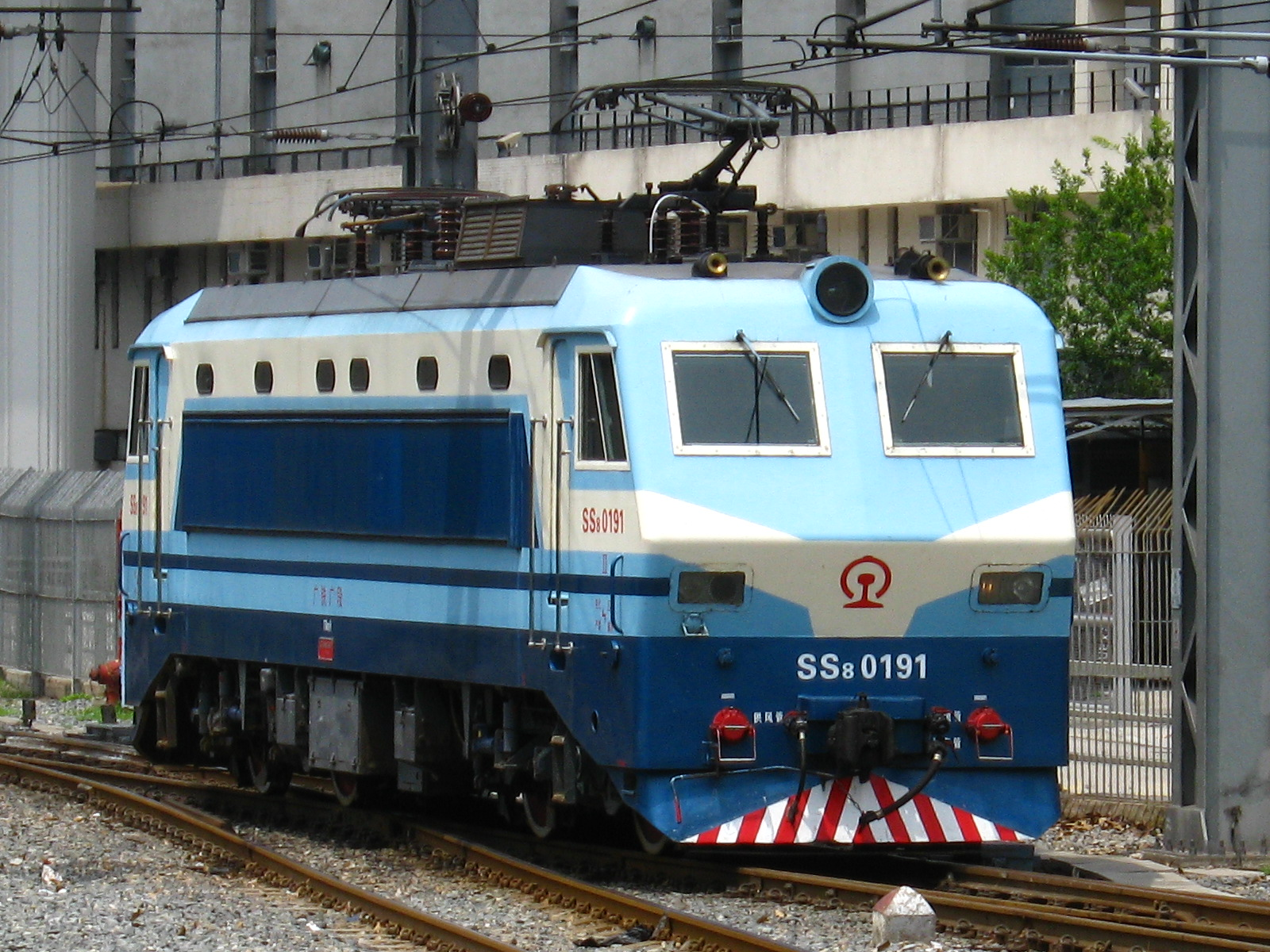
- SS8-0191 at Hung Hom station
Type and origin
- Power type: Electric
- Builder: Zhuzhou Electric Locomotive Works
- Model: SS_{8}
- Build date: 1994 – 2001
Specifications
- Configuration
  - Whyte: 0-4-4-0
  - UIC: Bo′Bo′
- Gauge: 1,435 mm (4 ft 8 1/2 in)
- Length: 17,516 mm (57 ft 5.6 in)
- Width: 3,100 mm (10 ft 2 in)
- Height: 4,040 mm (13 ft 3 in)
- Loco weight: 88 tonnes (87 long tons; 97 short tons)
- Electric system/s: 25 kV 50 Hz AC Catenary
- Current pickup: Pantograph
- Traction motors: 4 × ZD115
- Transmission: AC－DC
- Loco brake: Air and Dynamic
- Safety systems: AWS (Hong Kong through train), Alstom TVM-430 (Chinese Railway, For testing), LKJ-93 (Chinese Railway, Old type), LKJ-2000 (Chinese Railway, New type)
Performance figures
- Maximum speed: 170 km/h (106 mph); 239 km/h (149 mph) (record speed)
- Power output: 3,600 kW (4,830 hp)
- Tractive effort: 208 kN (46,760 lbf) starting 126 kN (28,330 lbf) continuous at 100 km/h (62 mph)
- Acceleration: 0.617 km (0.383 mi)/s
Career
- Operators: China Railway
- Nicknames: 扫把(Broom), "小八" ("Small Eight")

The Shaoshan 8 (Chinese: 韶山8) is a semi-high-speed electric locomotive used on the People's Republic of China's national railway system. The SS8 is based on its predecessor, the SS5, and was developed and built by CSR Zhuzhou Electric Locomotive Works.

== Routes ==
The only route they were used on was the Jingguang line, the railway line linking Beijing West railway station with Guangzhou, Guangdong. The SS8 currently serves the Shanghai–Kowloon through train and the Beijing–Kowloon through train.

== Speed record ==
On June 24, 1998, the SS8 broke the Chinese rail speed record by achieving a top speed of 239.6 km/h (148.9 mph) on a test run between Xuchang and Xiaoshangqiao. The locomotive used was fleet number 0001.

== Use on KCR ==
When the Guangzhou–Shenzhen railway was electrified, China Railway extended through trains into Hong Kong via the Kowloon–Canton Railway (KCR) East Rail line. These trains were initially hauled by an SS8 locomotive but their pantographs were considered harmful to KCR's catenary even after necessary conversions had been made. So, for a long time, China Railways DF11 diesel locomotives were used. After KCR provided their technical requirements of HK-compliance pantographs to China Railway, the company adapted some of their SS8's in order to meet the pantograph requirements. As of March 2010, the SS8 was still the only China Railway electric locomotive allowed to access Hong Kong.

Locomotive-hauled services have been cancelled after the COVID-19 pandemic, replaced by Guangzhou–Shenzhen–Hong Kong Express Rail Link.

== Gallery ==
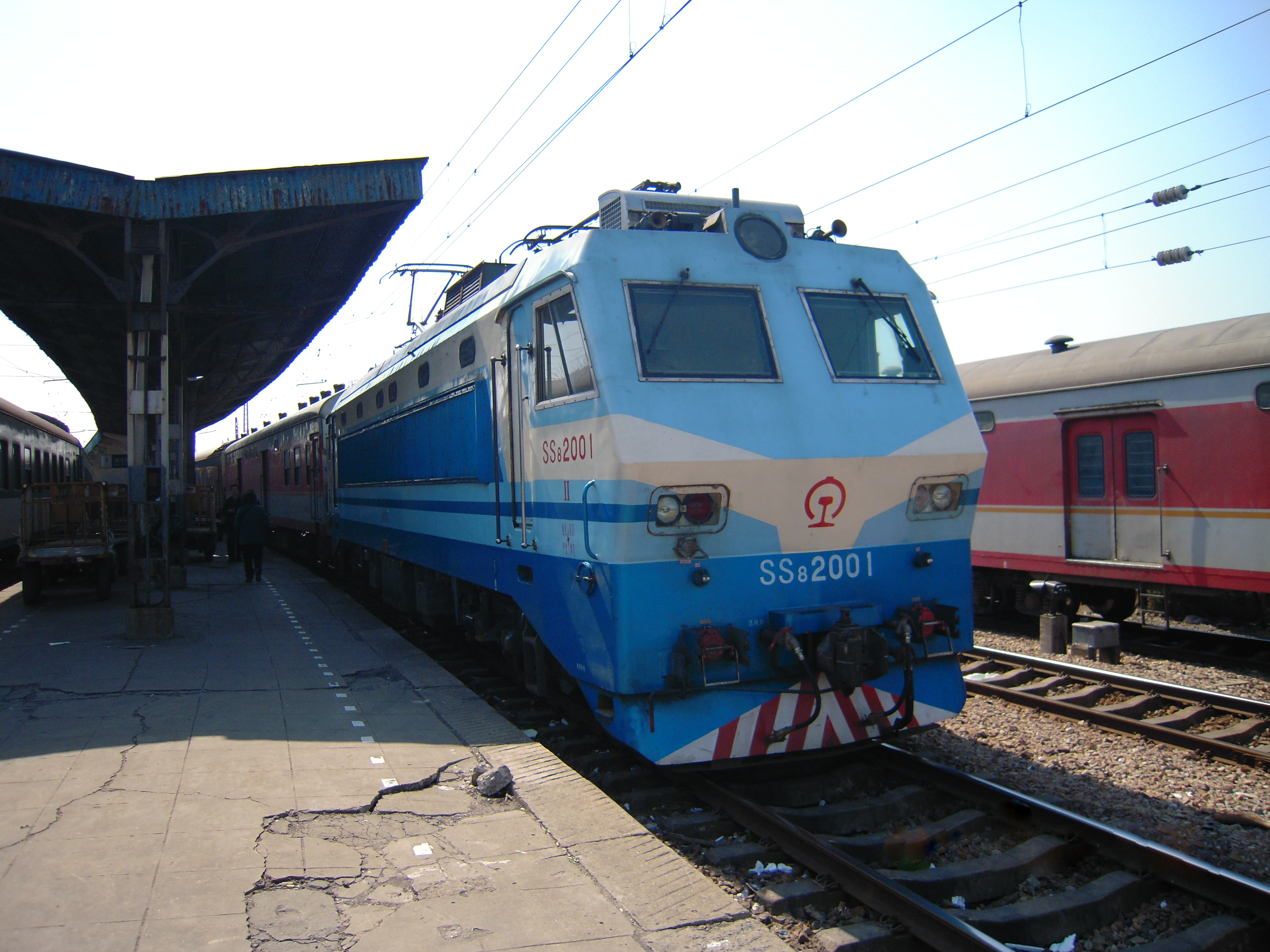
SS8-2001 in Nanjing West railway station

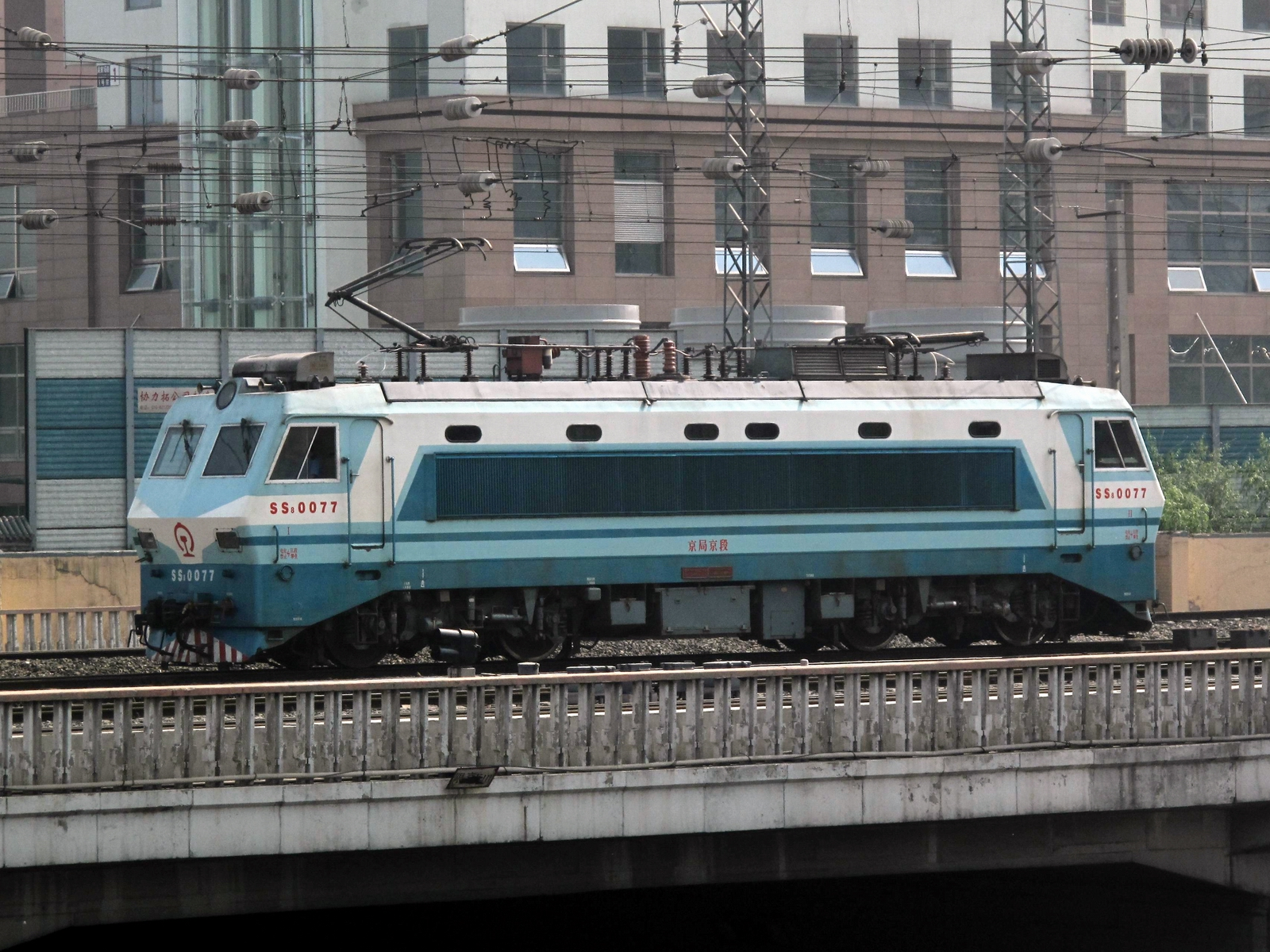
SS8-0077 in Beijing West railway station

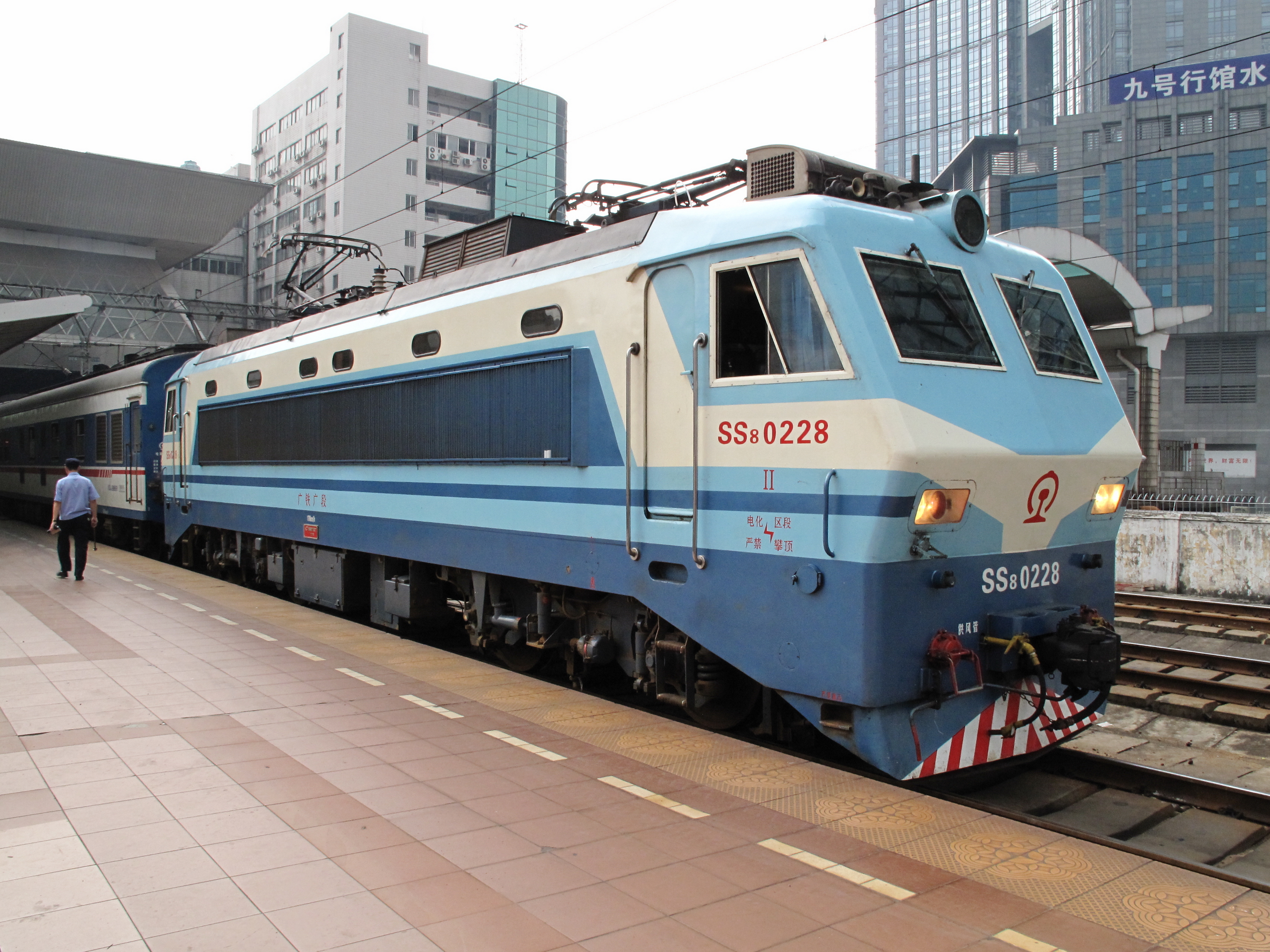
SS8-0228 in Guangzhou East railway station
