= Beijing–Kowloon through train =

Former railway service in China

Beijing–Kowloon through train 京九直通车 京九直通車
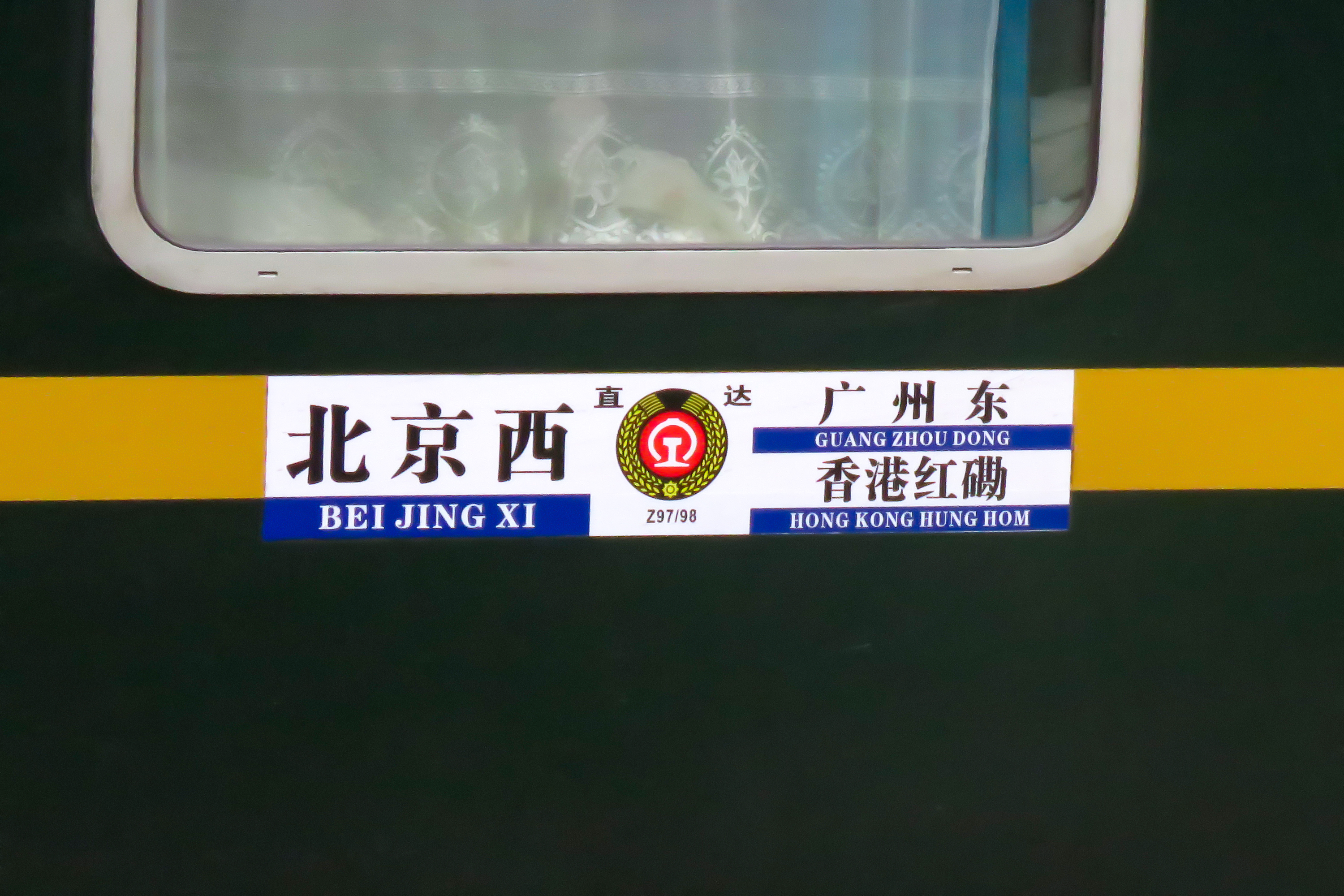
- Direction Board of Z97/98

Overview
- Service type: Inter-city rail
- Locale: Beijing; Hong Kong SAR
- First service: 18 May 1997
- Last service: 9 August 2022
- Current operator: CR Guangzhou

Route
- Termini: Beijing West; Guangzhou East; Hung Hom

Technical
- Track owners: China Railway (mainland section); KCRC (Hong Kong section)

Beijing–Kowloon through train
- Traditional Chinese: 京九直通車
- Simplified Chinese: 京九直通车
Transcriptions
Standard Mandarin
- Hanyu Pinyin: jīng jiǔ zhítōng chē
Yue: Cantonese
- Jyutping: ging1 gau2 zik6 tung1 ce1

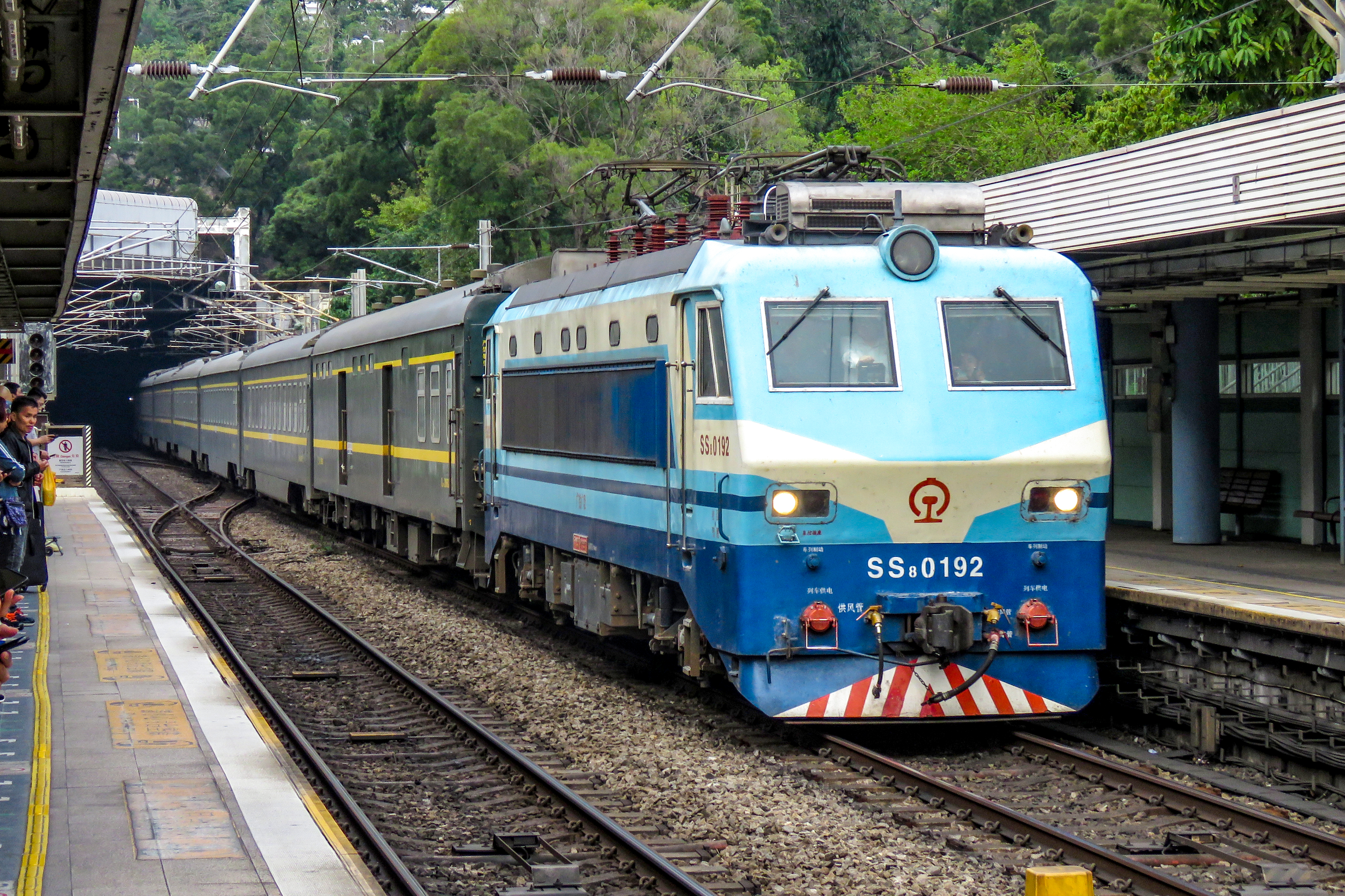
Beijing–Kowloon through train, hauled by a SS8 electric locomotive, passing through Kowloon Tong station in Hong Kong

The Beijing–Kowloon through train (simplified Chinese: 京九直通车; traditional Chinese: 京九直通車) was an intercity railway service between Hung Hom station (formerly Kowloon station until 1996) in Hong Kong and the Beijing West railway station in China, jointly operated by the MTRC of Hong Kong and China Railway, China's national rail service. The train ran to Beijing and Hong Kong every other day. Services used the East Rail line in Hong Kong, crossed the boundary between Hong Kong and mainland China at Lo Wu and then continued along China's railway network via the Guangshen railway and the Jingguang railway to Beijing. Total journey time was approximately 23 hours, and the train uses 25T class train carriages.

From 28 December 2017, travellers of selected nationalities are able to utilise the 144-hour transit when travelling on this line to or from Beijing, providing that they clear immigration in Beijing.

Due to the COVID-19 pandemic, services to Hong Kong has been suspended indefinitely since 30 January 2020. There has been no plan to resume its service, even after the end of the pandemic.

On 9 August 2022, the train Z97/98 was suspended due to the construction of the Guangzhou Baiyun railway station, which opened in December 2023.

On 4 June 2024, China Railway announced that the services from Beijing and Shanghai to Hung Hom will be replaced by high-speed sleeper trains to West Kowloon station. The train number renamed from Z97/98 to D909/910(Later renamed to G897/898 on 30 September 2024). The Beijing West railway station port is closed officially on 5 July 2024.

== Carriages ==
The train operated in two parts, where 11 carriages would depart Hong Kong (travelling under number Z97B from Beijing and Z98B from Hong Kong) with an additional 8 carriages added at Guangzhou East railway station (using number Z97A/Z98A), totalling 19 carriages. Along the route, trains stopped at Changsha, Wuhan and Zhengzhou, though only passengers travelling from Guangzhou might disembark due to customs and immigration reasons.

The Hong Kong to Beijing section of the train was divided into three distinct classes – hard sleeper, soft sleeper and luxury soft sleeper (catering only to two persons, with better furnishing and private lavatories). The Guangzhou to Beijing section of the train only had hard sleepers and hard seats.

Dining services were provided by the Guangshen Railway Company. Passengers may choose to buy from carts which are pushed throughout the train at different intervals, or choose to dine in the dining car. The dining car provided a selection of light refreshments, along with two sets of menus (one for breakfast, and one for lunch/dinner) providing a range of cooked, a la carte dishes.

| Carriage number | 1 | 2 | 3–5 | 6–9 | 10 | 11 | 12–15 | 16–17 | 18 | 19 |
| Type of carriages | XL25T; Baggage van (Chinese: 行李车) | YW25T; Hard sleeper (Chinese: 硬卧车) | YW25T; Hard Sleeper (Chinese: 硬卧车) | RW25T; Soft sleeper (Chinese: 软卧车) | RW19T; Luxury Soft Sleeper (Chinese: 高级包厢软卧车) | CA25T; Dining car (Chinese: 餐车) | YW25T; Hard Sleeper | YZ25T; Hard seat (Chinese: 硬座车) | YW25T; Hard Sleeper | UZ25T postal car (Chinese: 邮政车) |
| Notes | Carriages No. 1–11 go to Hong Kong (Z97B/98B) | | | | | | Carriages No.12-19 only serve passengers taking Z97A/98A | | | |

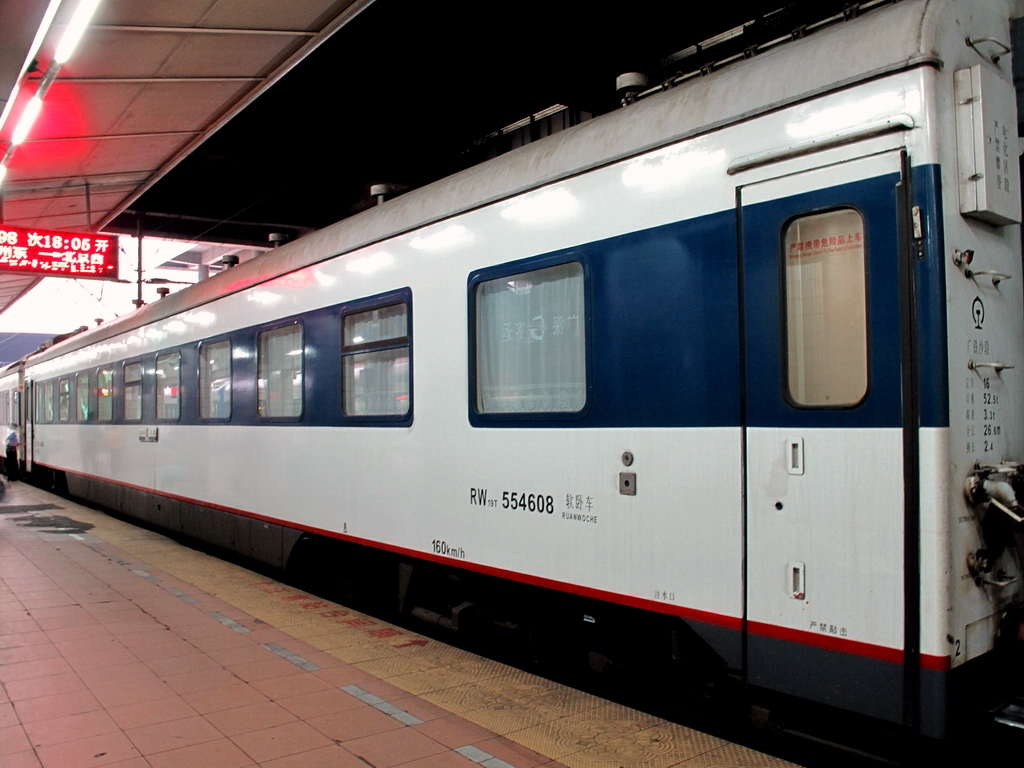
RW_{19T}Luxury soft sleeper carriage

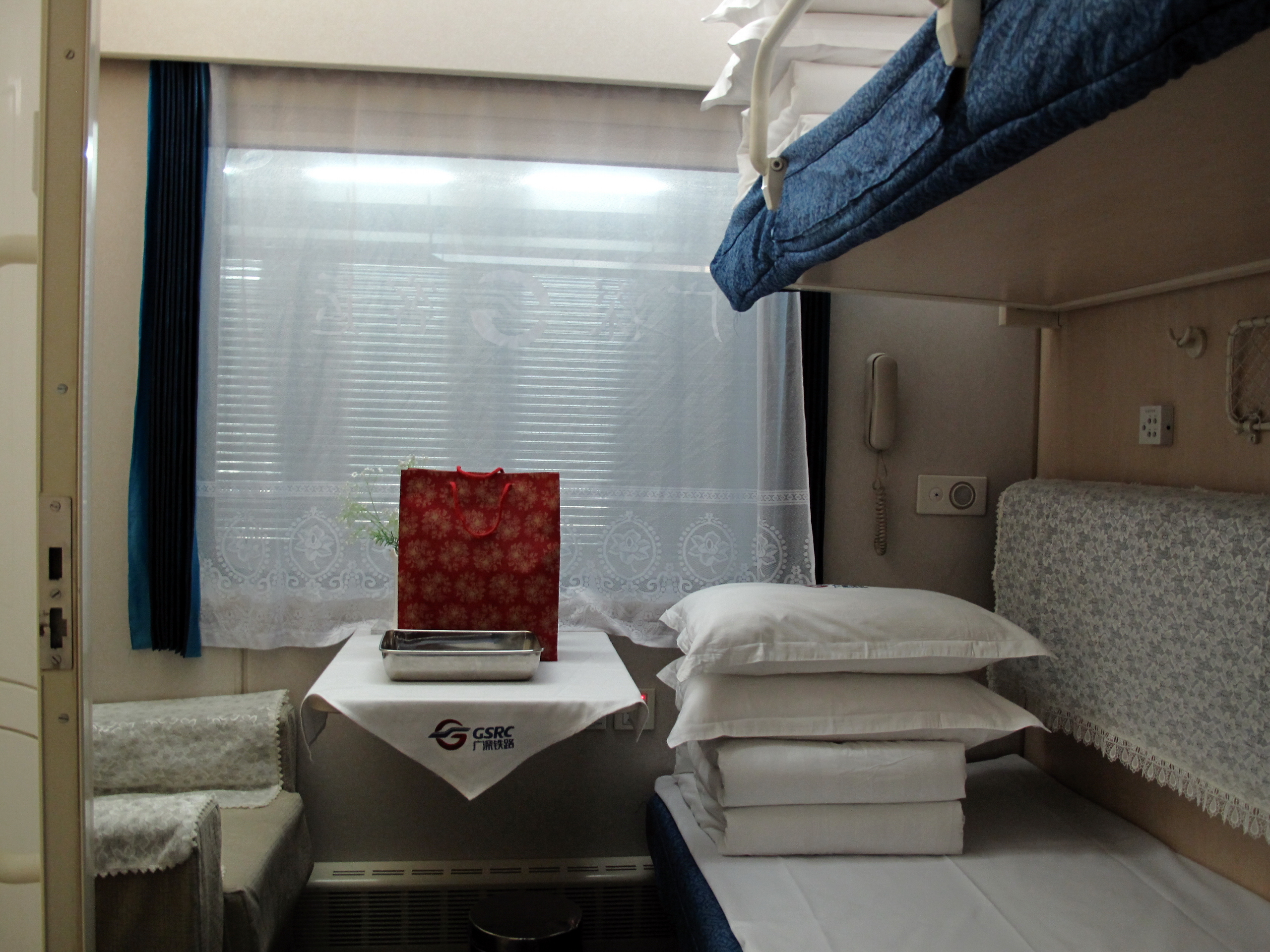
Interior of a luxury soft sleeper cabin

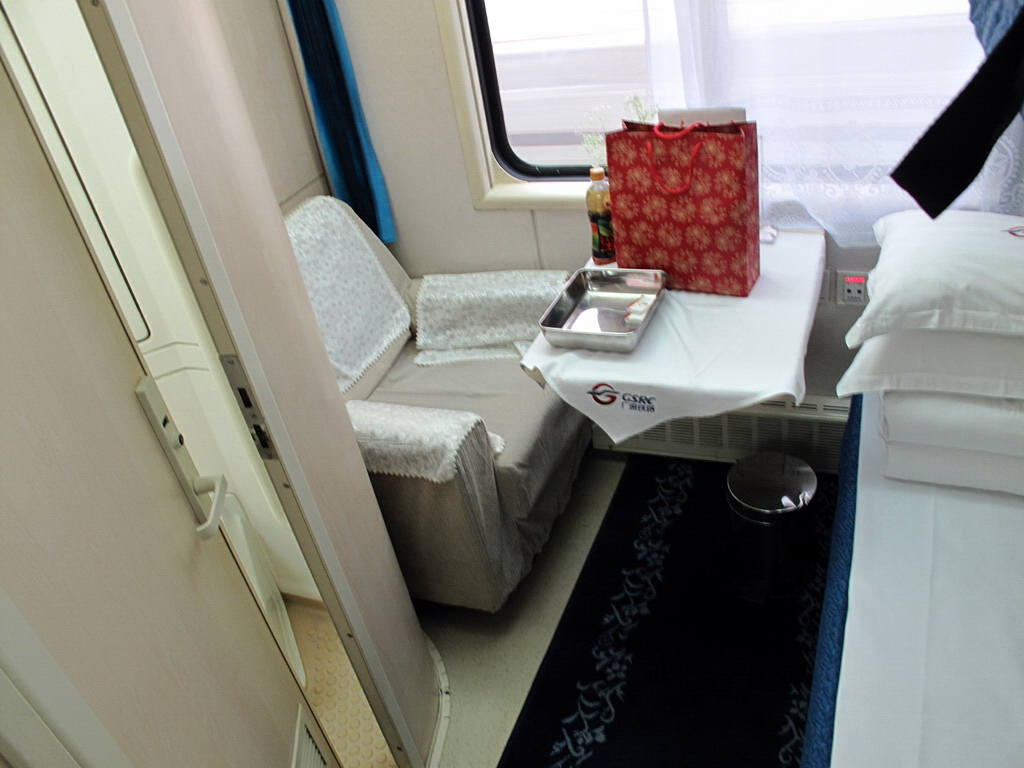
Another view of the interior of a luxury soft sleeper cabin

== Locomotives ==
The train changed locomotives once on the way.

| Sections | Hung Hom－Guangzhou East | Guangzhou East－Beijing West |
| Locomotives and their allocation | SS8 electric locomotive Guangzhou Railway Group Guangzhou Depot (Chinese: 广铁广段) | HXD1D electric locomotive Guangzhou Railway Group Guangzhou Depot (Chinese: 广铁广段) or HXD3D electric locomotive Beijing Railway Bureau Beijing Depot (Chinese: 京局京段) |

== Operation ==
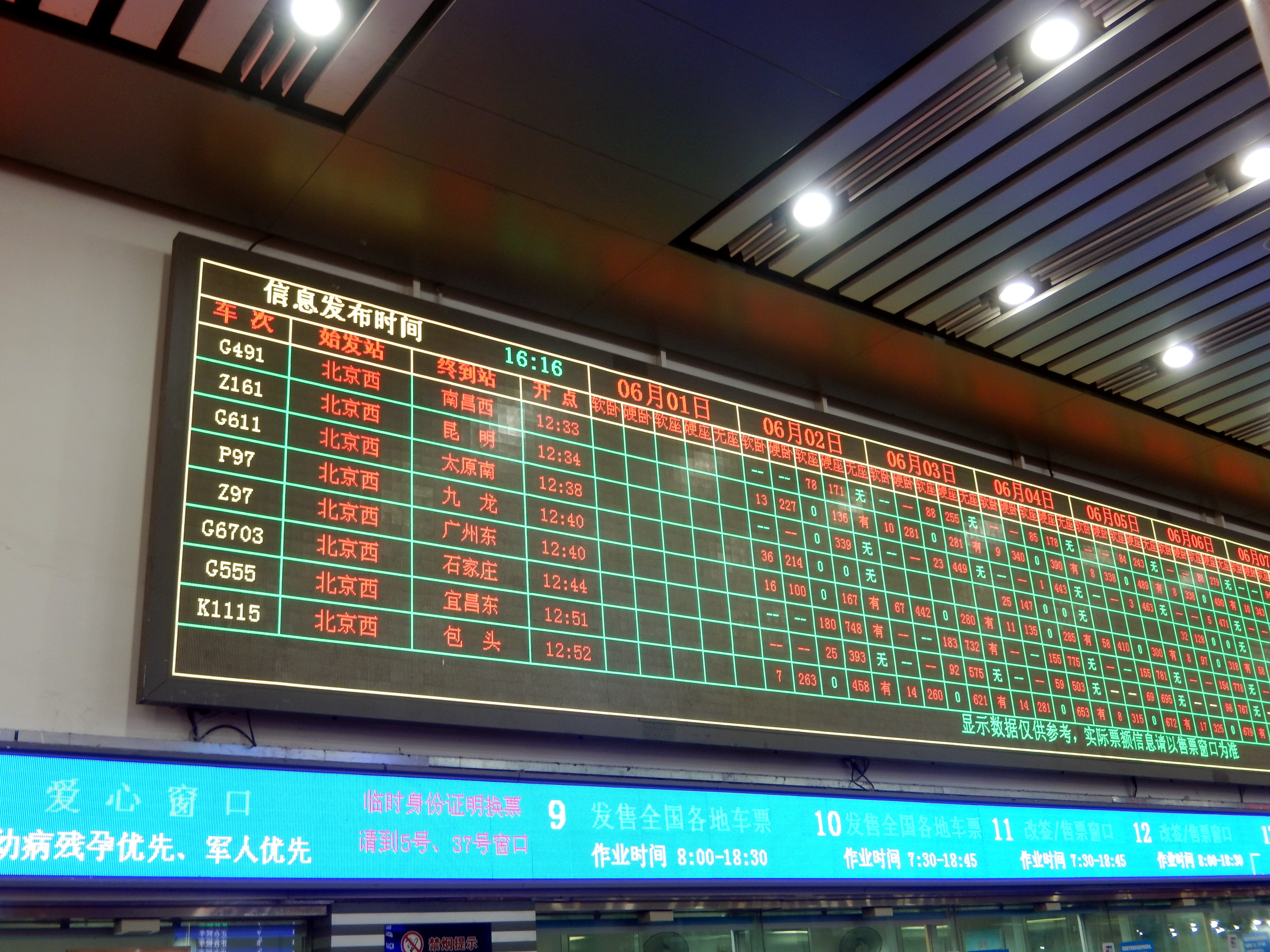
On the ticket availability board in Beijing West railway station, the Beijing–Kowloon through train was numbered as P97 to distinguish it from the train going to Guangzhou East.

=== Ticketing ===
Beijing-bound passengers from Hong Kong could order tickets from an online reservation system operated by the MTR Corporation. The system was limited to the one-way, Hong Kong to Beijing trips only. Ordering of tickets required extensive registration, including a credit card number, and tickets could only be delivered in the Hong Kong SAR, which made it impossible for most non-HK resident customers to order. Travellers for Beijing may purchase northbound tickets at a dedicated counter at Hung Hom station, whilst southbound tickets from Beijing to Hong Kong could only be purchased in Beijing or from travel agencies.

=== Service ===
Passengers departing from or arriving at Hong Kong could embark or disembark from platforms 5 or 6 of Hung Hom Station, which was restricted to intercity operations. Prior to boarding, passengers must go through Hong Kong immigration counters and cannot exit the restricted area.

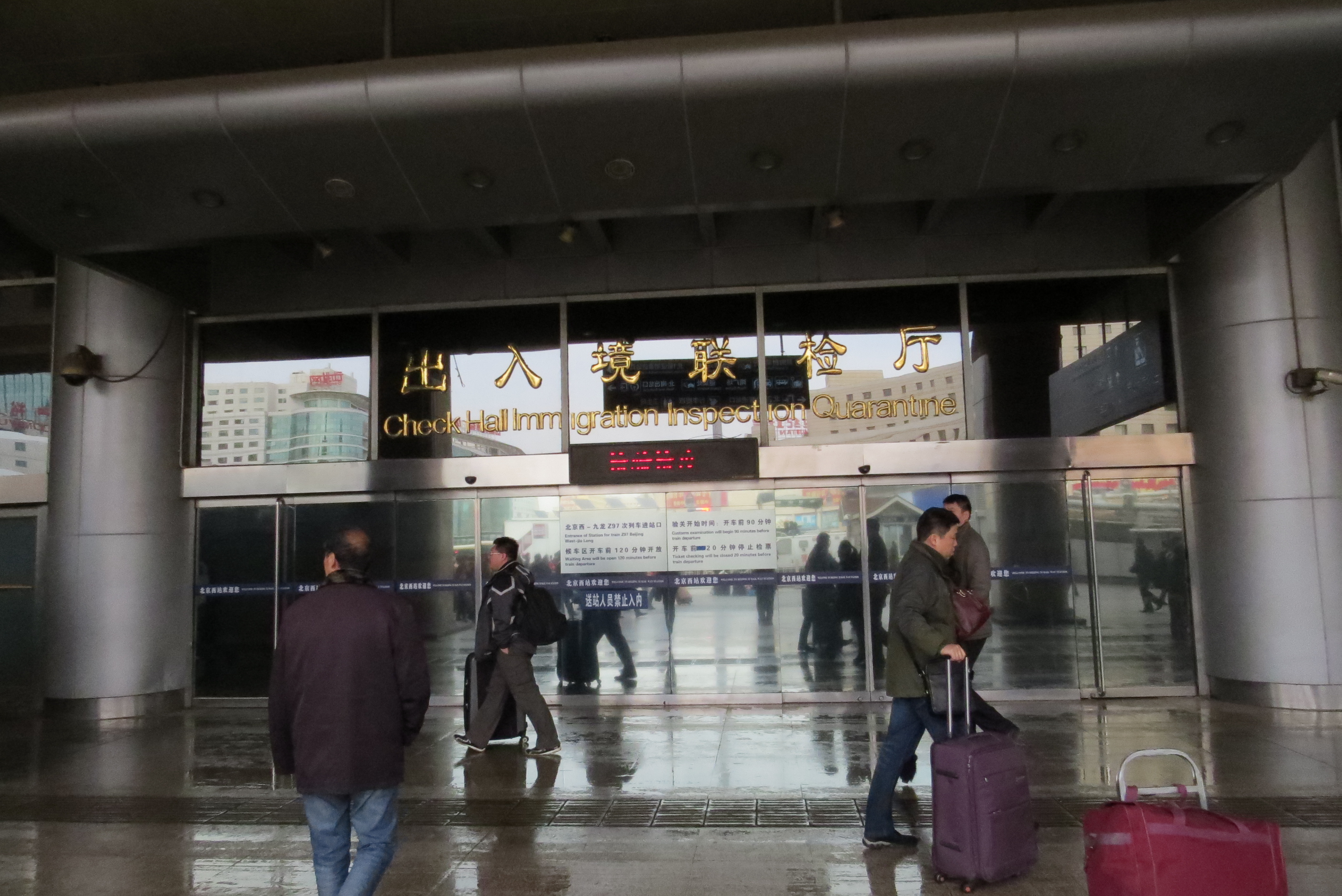
Check hall for Beijing–Kowloon through train at Beijing West railway station.

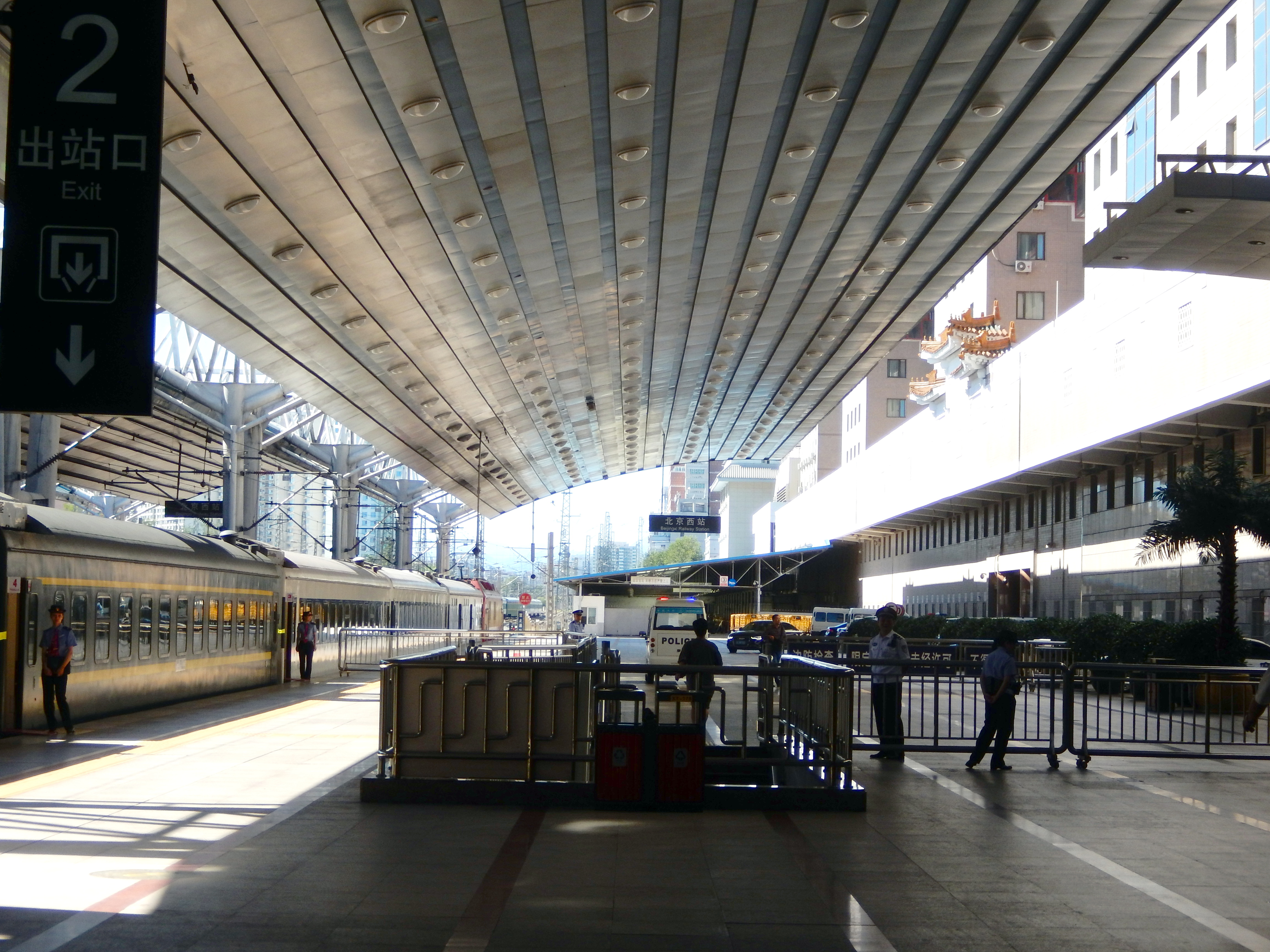

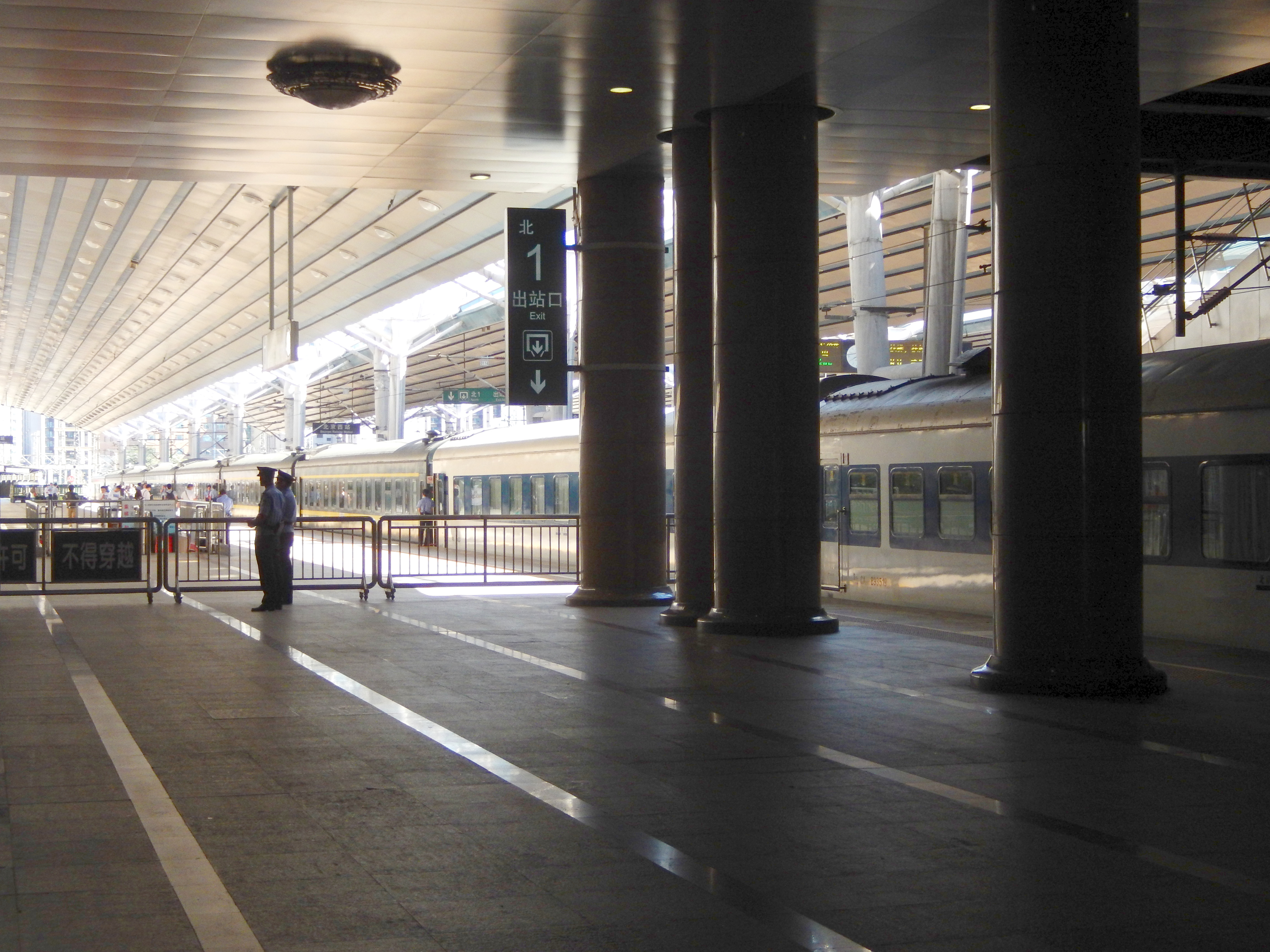
The platform area for the Kowloon section of train Z97 in Beijing West railway station is temporarily designated as boundary restricted area and guarded by police before departure.

Trains used platform 1 of Beijing West railway station, which was connected to the check hall for this particular through train service. Passengers coming from or going to Hong Kong clear Chinese immigration and customs in the hall. The part of the platform between the hall and the passenger cars for Hong Kong is cordoned off by police.

Trains operate from either terminating stations on an alternate schedule, under the following timetable:

Effective from 15 May 2016
| Z97 | | Stops | Z98 | |
| Arrive | Depart | Stops | Arrive | Depart |
|---|---|---|---|---|
| — | 12:40 | Beijing West | 15:30 | — |
| 18:25 | 18:31 | Zhengzhou | 09:37 | 09:44 |
| 23:05 | 23:11 | Wuchang | 04:56 | 05:02 |
| 02:26 | 02:32 | Changsha | 01:29 | 01:35 |
| 10:01 | 11:04 | Guangzhou East | 17:16 | 18:06 |
| 13:01 | — | Hung Hom | — | 15:15 |

== See also ==
- Guangzhou–Shenzhen railway
- MTR
- Beijing–Guangzhou–Shenzhen–Hong Kong high-speed railway
- Shanghai–Kowloon through train
- Jingguang Railway
- Jingjiu Railway
