= Shanghai–Kowloon through train =

Rail service between China and Hong Kong

Shanghai–Kowloon through train 滬九直通車
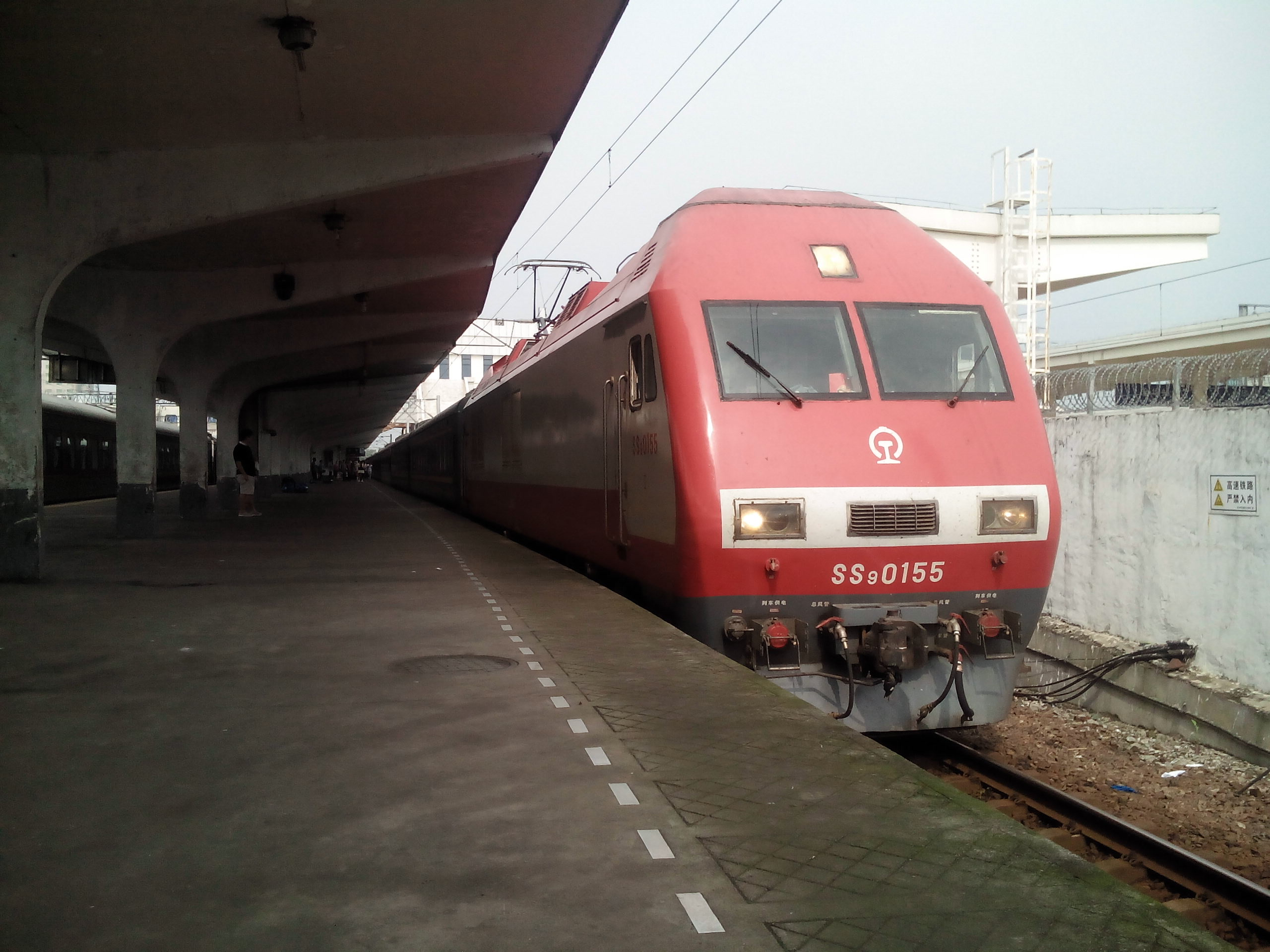

Overview
- Service type: Inter-city rail
- Locale: Shanghai; Hong Kong SAR
- First service: May 19, 1997; 29 years ago
- Last service: January 12, 2026; 7 months ago
- Current operator: CR Shanghai

Route
- Termini: Shanghai South; Guangzhou Baiyun; ~~Hung Hom~~ (Note: Services to Hung Hom were permanently suspended after 30 Jan 2020, and before its discontinuation, the train only ran from Shanghai to Guangzhou Baiyun.)

Technical
- Track owners: China Railway (mainland section); ~~KCRC (Hong Kong section)~~

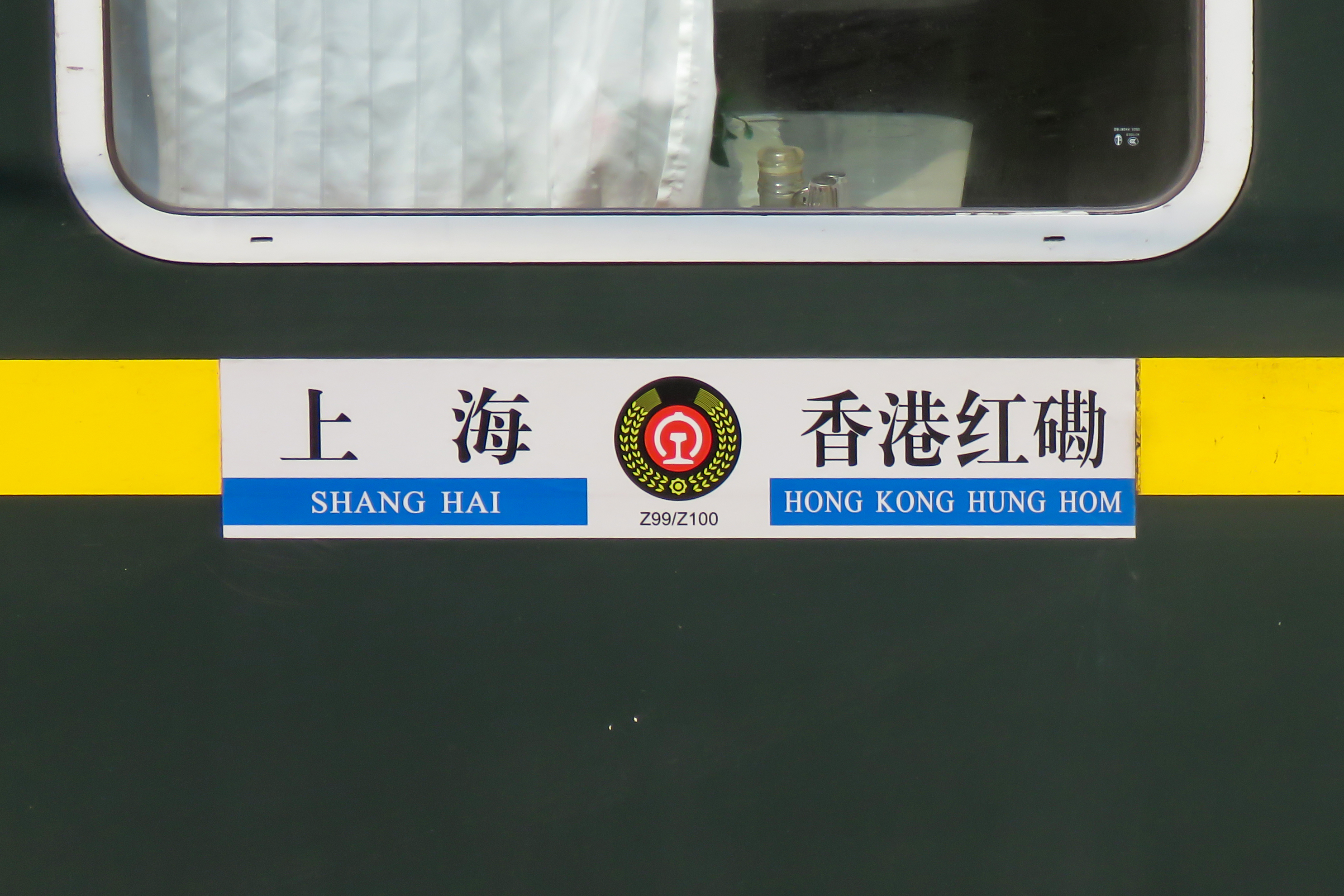
The direction sign of Shanghai–Kowloon through train, taken near Hung Hom station; the southern destination has been labelled as "Hong Kong Hung Hom" since April 2019

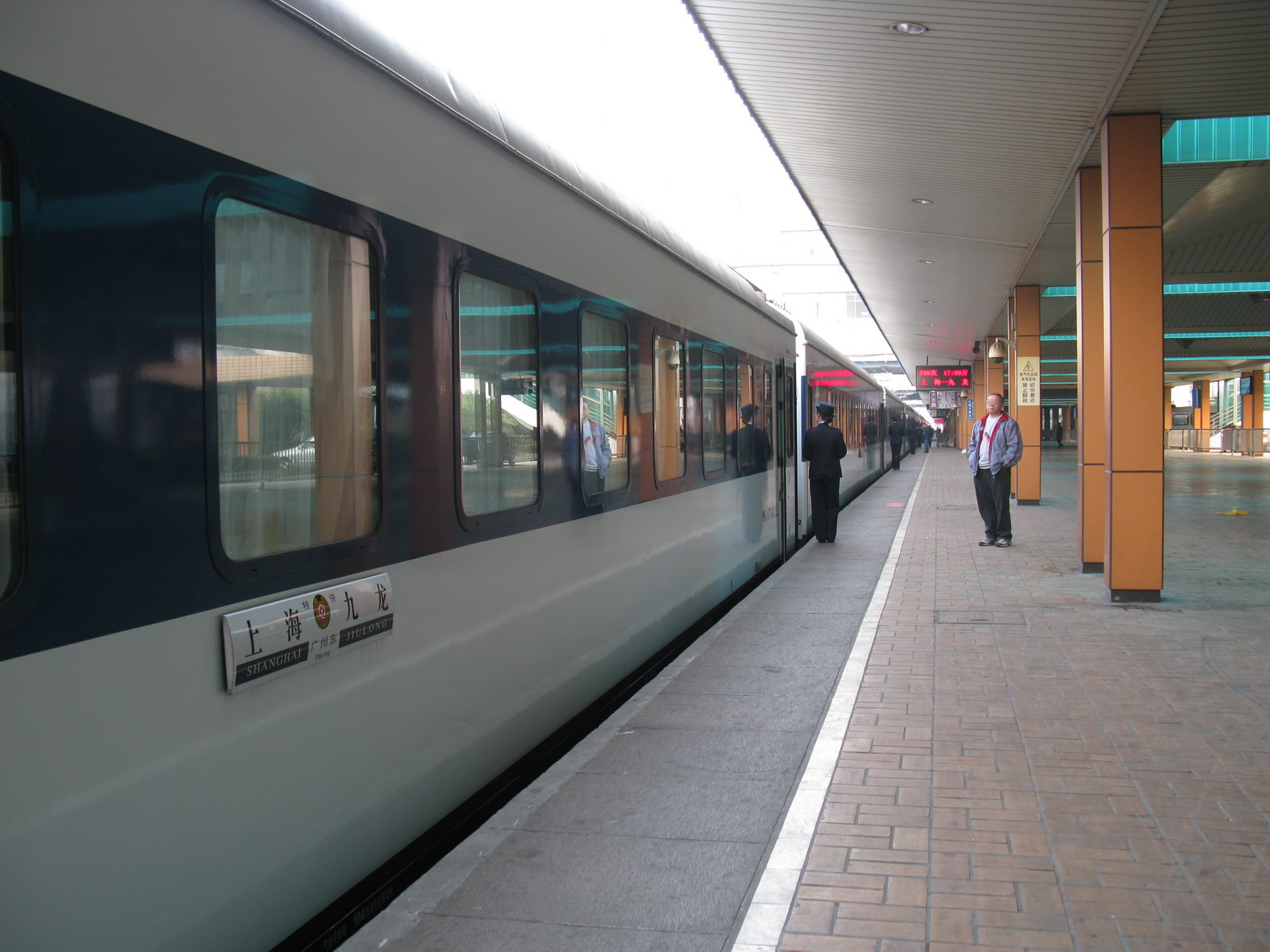
Shanghai–Kowloon through train at Shanghai railway station

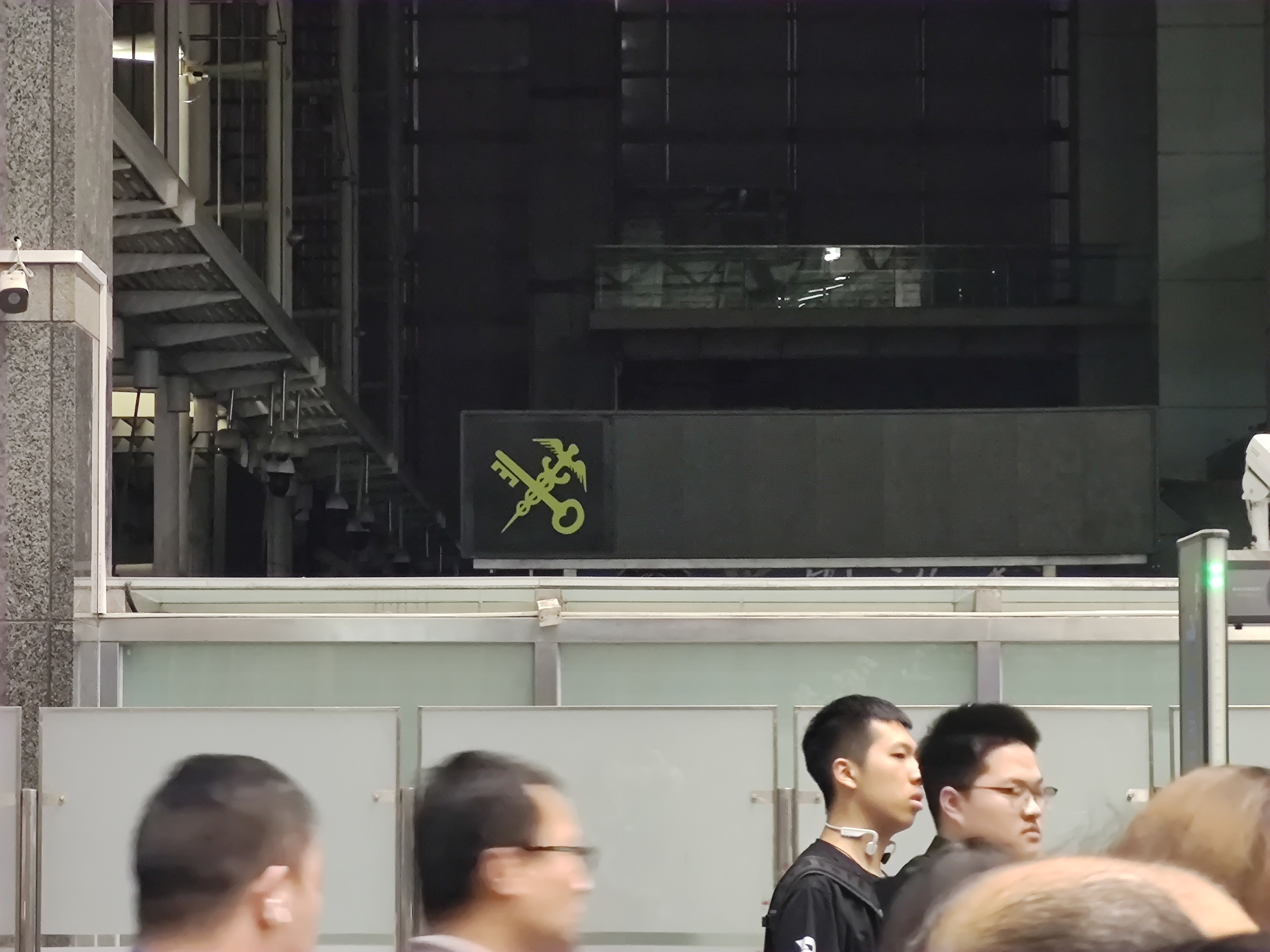
The customs and immigration check area of Shanghai railway station are closed after Shanghai–Kowloon through train suspended

The Shanghai–Kowloon through train was a train that ran between Hong Kong and Shanghai railway station in China, jointly operated by the MTR Corporation Limited of Hong Kong and China's national rail service (Shanghai Railway Bureau). The numbers of this train service were Z99B (away from Shanghai) and Z100B (towards Shanghai). Services operated along the East Rail line in Hong Kong, crossing the boundary between Hong Kong and Mainland China at Lo Wu/Luohu and then continuing along China's railway network via the Guangshen railway, Jingguang railway and the Hukun railway to Shanghai. The train ran every other day. The journey time was approximately 20 hours.

The stops on the route were Guangzhou East, and Jinhua stations. Only passengers taking Z99A/Z100A (Shanghai-Guangzhou East) could disembark at these stops.

After October 1, 2003, passengers taking Z99B could not disembark at the stops listed above, as all travellers to Hong Kong from Shanghai clear Chinese immigration and customs at Shanghai station, and once they had done so they were considered to have left Mainland China and were no longer permitted to leave the train until their arrival at Hung Hom station. The same rule also applied to northbound travellers (Z100B) who would clear Chinese immigration once they had arrived at Shanghai station. 144-hour visa-free transit for passengers who were of selected nationalities were available since January 30, 2016.

Due to the COVID-19 pandemic, services to Hong Kong have been suspended indefinitely since January 30, 2020. There has been no plan to resume its service, even after the end of the pandemic. After the resumption of train services was suspended due to COVID-19, this series of train services only retain the itinerary within mainland China (Shanghai-Guangzhou) and no longer operate the itinerary to Hong Kong.

On June 4, 2024, China Railway announced that the train services from Shanghai and Beijing to Hung Hom would be replaced by high-speed sleeper trains to West Kowloon station. The train number was renamed from Z99/100 to D907/908 (Later G899/900). Shanghai railway station port is closed officially on July 5, 2024.

On July 1, 2025, Z99/Z100 adjusted its startpoint and endpoint to Shanghai Songjiang and Guangzhou Baiyun respectively, and re-added a stop in Hangzhou South station, last served in 2023.

On January 12, 2026, the last Z99 train departing Shanghai Songjiang station using 25T class train carriages was operated. With the last return trip Z100 on the following day, this marks the end of 25T class train operations on this route. Starting January 26, 2026, the train was renumbered to D99/D100, starting from Shanghai South station, and served by CR200J trains.

== Train carriages ==
Shanghai–Kowloon through train used 25T class train carriages. The train had 18 carriages in total. But only 11 carriages went to Hong Kong because the other 7 carriages served Z99A/Z100A, they were decoupled (for Z99B to go to Hong Kong) at the Guangzhou East railway station.

The dining car of the train was a favourite of many passengers of the train, serving food such as shrimp and fish.

Carriage number	1	2	3－6	7－9	10	11	12-14	15-17	18
Type of carriages	XL25T; Baggage car (Chinese: 行李车)	YW25T; Hard sleeper (Chinese: 硬卧车)	YW25T; Hard Sleeper	RW25T; Soft sleeper (Chinese: 软卧车)	RW19T; Luxury Soft Sleeper (Chinese: 高级包厢软卧车)	CA25T; Dining car (Chinese: 餐车)	YW25T; Hard Sleeper	YZ25T; Hard seat (Chinese: 硬座车)	YW25T; Hard Sleeper
Notes	Carriages No.1-11 go to Hong Kong (Z99B/Z100B)						Carriages No.12-18 only serve passengers taking Z99A/Z100A		

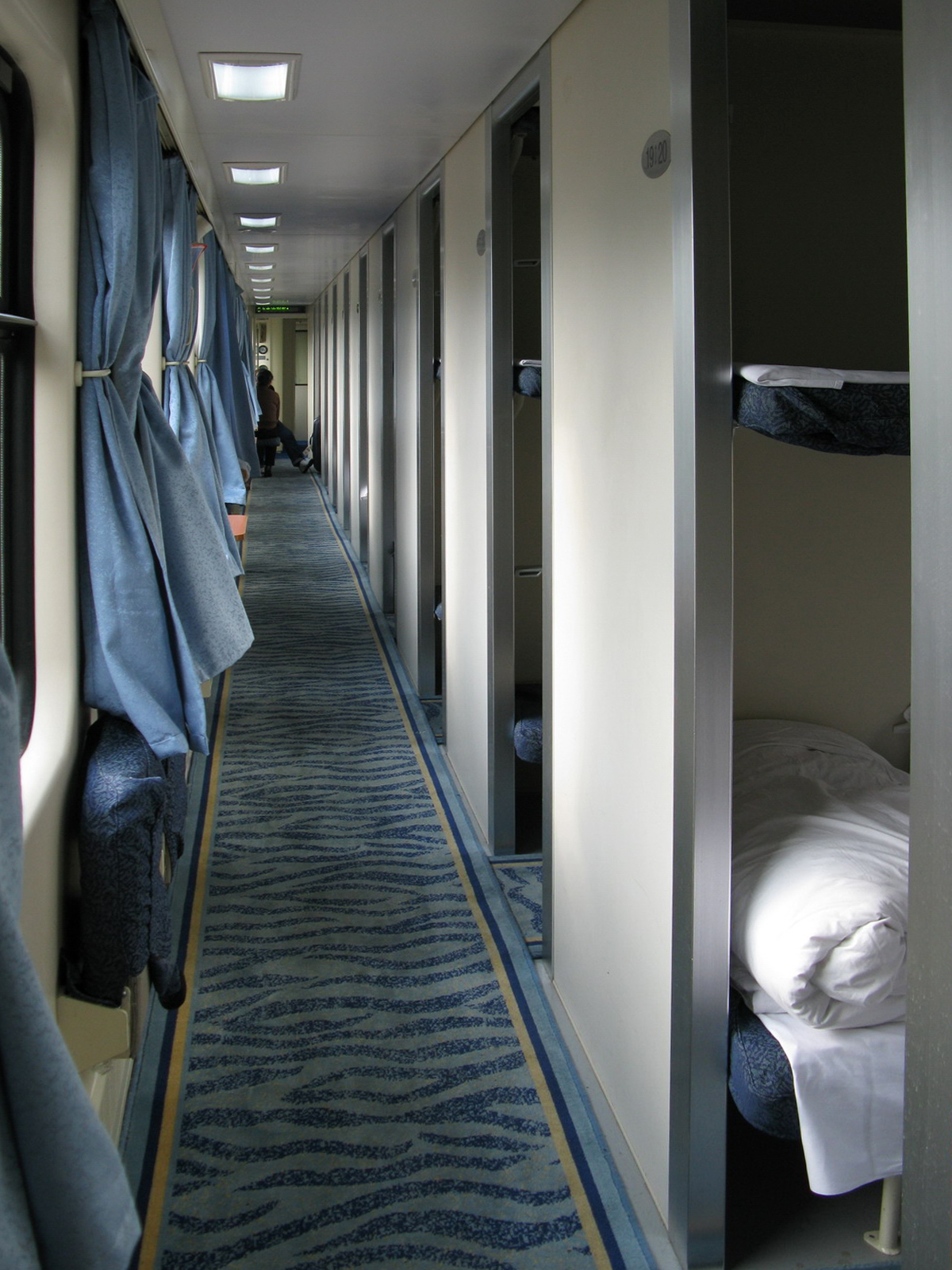
Hard sleeper Car of 25T class train carriages

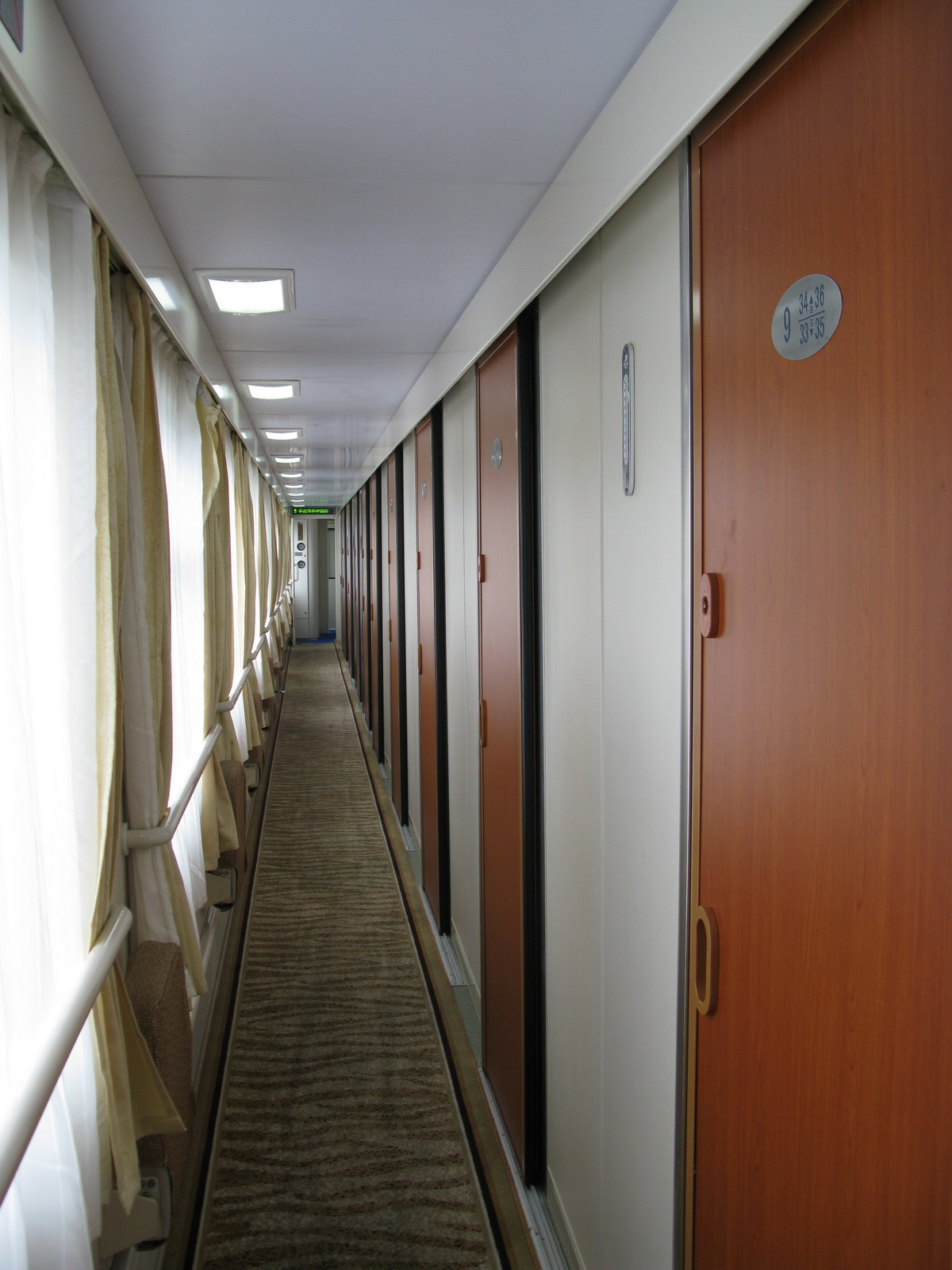
Soft Sleeper Car of 25T class train carriages

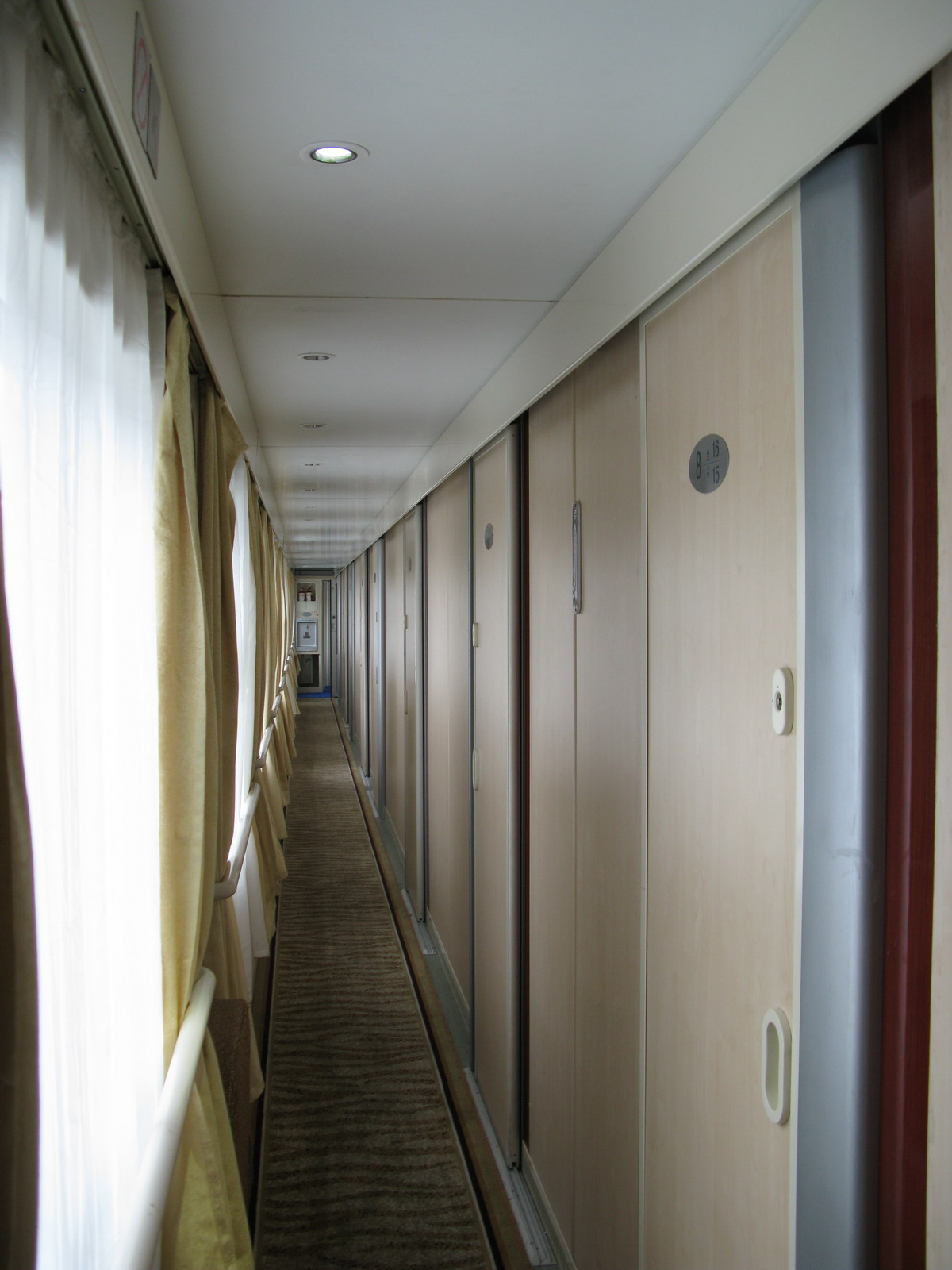
Luxury Soft Sleeper Car of 25T class train carriages

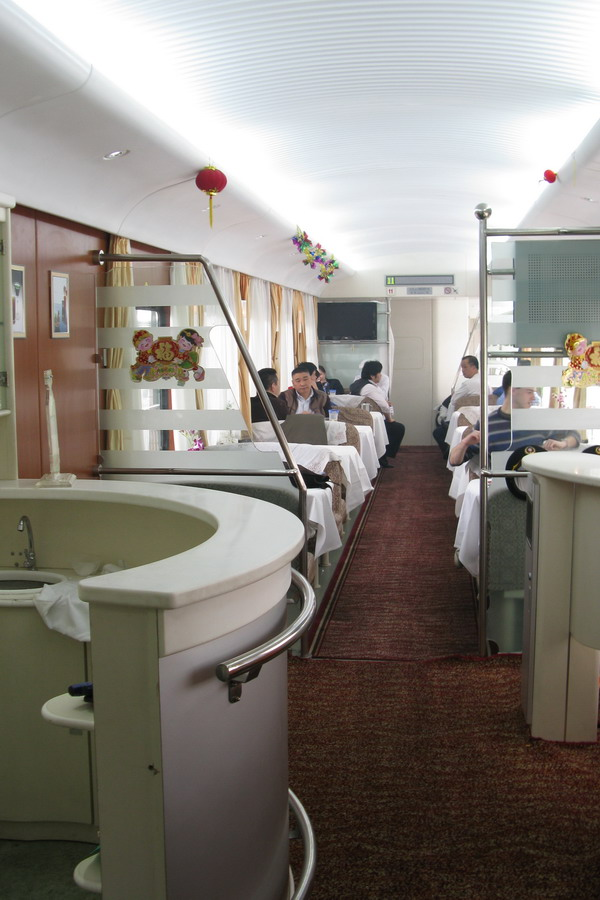
Dining Car of 25T class train carriages

== Timetable ==
Shanghai-Kowloon Through Train

The following timetable was the train's final timetable before its discontinuation.

Z99		Stops	Z100	
Arrive	Depart	Stops	Arrive	Depart
-	17:19	Shanghai	10:46	-
19:26	19:29	Hangzhou South	08:41	08:44
20:40	20:46	Jinhua	07:24	07:30
09:45	-	Guangzhou Baiyun	-	18:14

== See also ==
- Shanghai Railway Bureau
- MTR
- Shanghai–Hangzhou high-speed railway
- Hangzhou–Fuzhou–Shenzhen railway
- Beijing–Kowloon through train
