= Hung Hom station =

Railway station in Kowloon, Hong Kong

Hung Hom 紅磡
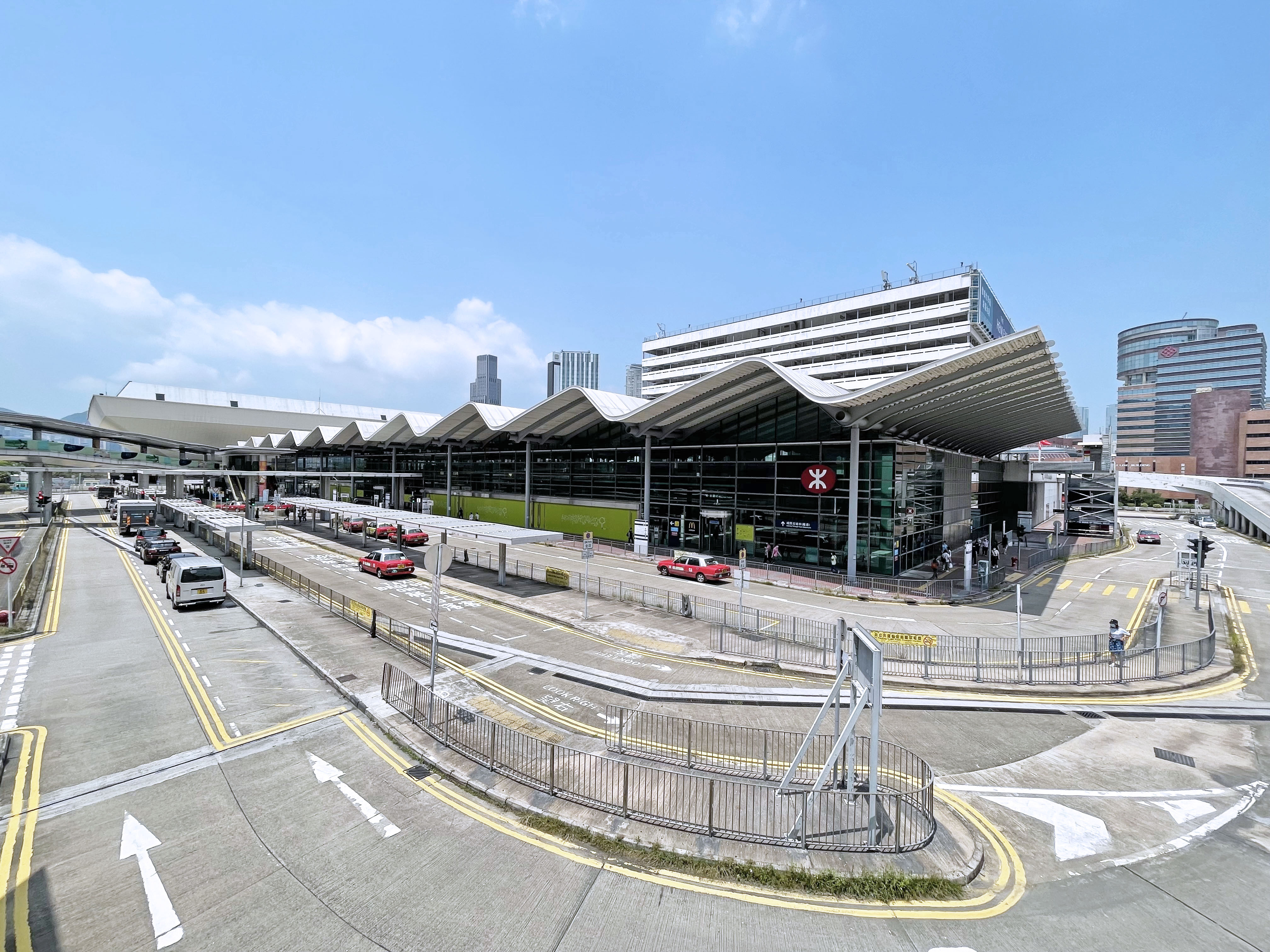
- Station exterior (May 2022)

Chinese name
- Traditional Chinese: 紅磡
- Simplified Chinese: 红磡
- Jyutping: Hung4ham3
- Hanyu Pinyin: Hóngkàn
- Literal meaning: Red Cliff
Transcriptions
Standard Mandarin
- Hanyu Pinyin: Hóngkàn
Yue: Cantonese
- Yale Romanization: Hùngham
- IPA: [hʊŋ˩hɐm˧]
- Jyutping: Hung4ham3

General information
- Location: Cheong Wan Road, Hung Hom Bay; Yau Tsim Mong District, Kowloon; Hong Kong
- Coordinates: 22°18′10″N 114°10′54″E
- System: MTR rapid transit station
- Owner: KCR Corporation
- Operator: MTR Corporation
- Lines: East Rail line; Tuen Ma line
- Platforms: 4 (2 island platforms); 6 closed platforms (3 island platforms)
- Tracks: 11
- Train operators: MTR
- Bus stands: Hung Hom station bus terminus
- Connections: Bus, minibus; Hung Hom Ferry Pier; taxi

Construction
- Structure type: At-grade, fully covered (Tuen Ma line); Underground (East Rail line)
- Depth: At-grade-Underground
- Platform levels: 3
- Parking: Fortune Metropolis
- Accessible: Yes

Other information
- Station code: HUH

History
- Opened: KCR British section: 30 November 1975; 50 years ago; Intercity Through Train: 4 April 1979; 47 years ago; Sha Tin to Central Link Tuen Ma line: 20 June 2021; 5 years ago; Sha Tin to Central Link East Rail line: 15 May 2022; 4 years ago
- Closed: West Rail line old platforms: 20 June 2021; 5 years ago; East Rail line old platforms: 15 May 2022; 4 years ago; Intercity Through Train: 31 July 2024; 2 years ago (de facto 29 January 2020; 6 years ago)
- Electrified: 16 May 1982; 44 years ago
- Former names: Kowloon

Services
Preceding station	MTR	Following station
Exhibition Centre towards Admiralty	East Rail line	Mong Kok East towards Lo Wu or Lok Ma Chau
Terminus	East Rail line Northbound trips in early morning	Mong Kok East towards Lo Wu or Lok Ma Chau
East Tsim Sha Tsui towards Tuen Mun	Tuen Ma line	Ho Man Tin towards Wu Kai Sha
Track layout
Original platforms
New platforms
Location
- Location within MTR Location within Hong Kong urban core

Hung Hom (Chinese: 紅磡; Cantonese Yale: Hùngham) (formerly named Kowloon until 1996) is a passenger railway station in Hung Hom Bay, Kowloon, Hong Kong. Its livery is light red. It is an interchange station between the East Rail line and the Tuen Ma line domestic services of the MTR network. This station serves as the southern terminus of the East Rail Line in the early morning, before the first northbound train from Admiralty arrives. The station is located next to the Cross-Harbour Tunnel's northern portal, and thus it is also served by many cross-harbour bus routes.

Opened as the new southern terminus of the Kowloon–Canton Railway (KCR) on 24 November 1975, the station was substantially expanded in the 1990s, at which time it was given its present name. The KCR British Section was also renamed KCR East Rail in order to differentiate it from the new KCR West Rail, which opened on 20 December 2003 and was extended to Hung Hom station on 16 August 2009.

As part of the Sha Tin to Central Link project, the East Rail line was extended across Victoria Harbour to Admiralty via a new immersed tube tunnel to the south of Hung Hom. The West Rail line was also extended via eastern Kowloon to connect to the former Ma On Shan line, with the combined line being renamed "Tuen Ma line".

Hung Hom station also served as the southern terminus of cross-border through-trains from mainland China, which were halted in 2020 due to the COVID-19 pandemic and officially ended in 2024.

== History ==
=== Former Hung Hom station ===
An older station of the same name once existed on Chatham Road South. It was situated on the former coastline of Hung Hom Bay, at the southeastern corner of the Gun Club Hill Barracks (between the current-day Chung Sze Yuen Building A of the Hong Kong Polytechnic University and the Hong Kong Museum of History).

This old Hung Hom station, a temporary wooden structure, operated from 1 October 1910 (the day the Kowloon–Canton Railway began operation) until 15 September 1921 It was later demolished and replaced by this station on 30 November 1975.

=== Relocation of Kowloon station ===
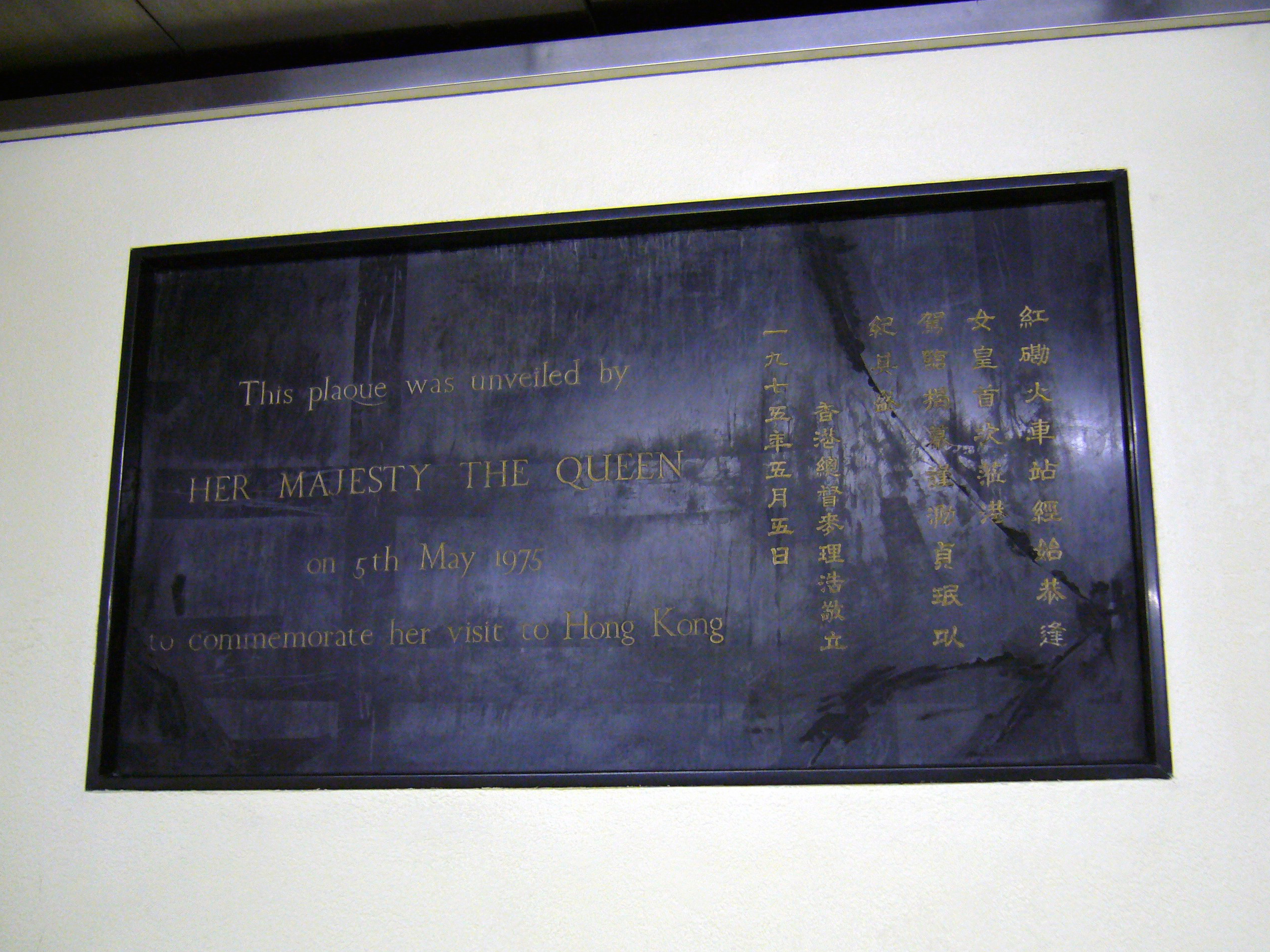
Plaque unveiled by Elizabeth II commemorating the opening of the station

The old Kowloon station in Tsim Sha Tsui began operation on 28 March 1916. After decades of economic growth in Hong Kong, the station, situated at the seafront of Victoria Harbour, became too small and had no room for expansion. On 5 May 1975, Queen Elizabeth II unveiled a plaque commemorating the opening of the new terminal. A new Kowloon station (the current Hung Hom station), situated to the east, was officially inaugurated by Chief Secretary Denys Roberts on 24 November 1975 as the new southern terminus of the East Rail line. However, it did not start operating until a few days later. The old terminal at Tsim Sha Tsui was closed on 29 November 1975. The first passenger train pulled out of Hung Hom the following morning at 8:26 am.

The new station cost HK$150 million and offered modern new facilities including a spacious waiting hall, a restaurant, a bar, a bookstore, a bank, escalators, and closed circuit television. It was built along with a bus terminus and a multi-storey car park.

The controversial demolition of the old station commenced on 7 June 1978; a new complex of a concert hall and museums were built on Kowloon station's original site, but the clock tower was preserved as a Declared Monument.

Through trains to mainland China started running from Hung Hom station on 4 April 1979.

=== Renaming and expansion ===
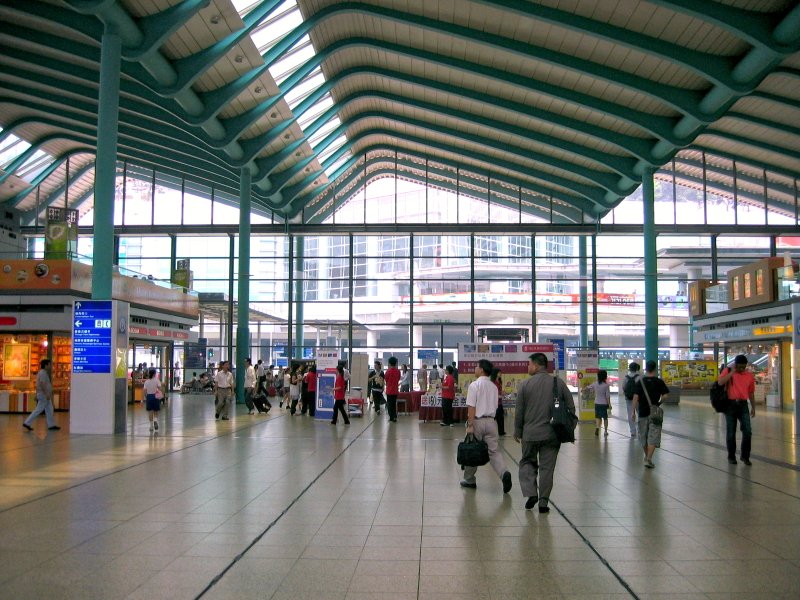
Lobby of Hung Hom station (2006)

The new station was renamed Hung Hom station around February or March 1996. The KCR British Section was renamed KCR East Rail in 1996, and subsequently the East Rail line upon the merger of the MTR (metro services) and the Kowloon-Canton Railway (suburban train services) in December 2007. However, China Railway still referred to the station as Jiulong, which was the Mandarin pronunciation of Kowloon, until April 2019.

A HK$1.3 billion expansion of Hung Hom station began on 16 March 1995, which included a new concourse designed by Foster and Partners. The expansion was completed in 1998. The passenger terminal now hosts ticket offices, waiting areas, shops and restaurants.

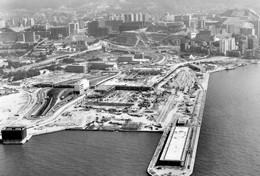
Hung Hom station under construction

The construction of the East Rail extension to East Tsim Sha Tsui station began on 20 April 2001. Work was undertaken at Hung Hom station to extend tracks 2 and 3 southward, and to demolish the southern concourse of the station and replace it with a new mid-level concourse. Some structural columns, supporting the Hong Kong Coliseum above, had to be demolished and underpinned to make way for the construction of the tracks. Throughout the works, at least three of the four East Rail platforms had to be kept in operation. The extension was opened on 24 October 2004, turning Hung Hom into an intermediate station for the first time.

On 16 August 2009, East Tsim Sha Tsui was transferred to the West Rail line following the opening of the Kowloon Southern Link, and Hung Hom became the southbound terminus station of both the East Rail and West Rail lines. Platforms 2 and 3 were transferred to the West Rail line and served as the line's eastern terminus. Meanwhile, Platforms 1 and 4 became the termination platform of the East Rail line with arriving trains alternating between the two platforms.

As part of the Sha Tin to Central Link project, two new island platforms were constructed under the eastern side of the existing station podium. The West Rail line was relocated to its new platforms on 20 June 2021, a week ahead of the full opening of the Tuen Ma line. Temporary walkways were placed across the original West Rail line tracks, now defunct, to connect the East Rail line's platforms. On 27 June 2021, the West Rail line was absorbed into the Tuen Ma line.

The East Rail line moved to the new underground platforms beneath the Tuen Ma line platforms on 15 May 2022, upon the opening of the line's extension to Admiralty. The last train departed from the old platforms at 00:28 on 15 May 2022, and the original East Rail, West Rail line and through train platforms were permanently closed to passengers thereafter. Hung Hom is now an intermediate station on both the East Rail and Tuen Ma lines.

On 25 October 2023, it was announced that the MTR Corporation would be invited by the government of Hong Kong to conduct a preliminary study and submit proposals in 2024 for the redevelopment of an approximately 10-hectare area centred on the station.

In 2024, an exhibition named “Station Rail Voyage” (「站見」鐵路展 , zaam6 gin3 tit3 lou6 jin2), and renamed "Station Rail Voyage: Explorer" (「載遇•站見」鐵路展 , zoi3 jyu6 zaam6 gin3 tit3 lou6 jin2) in 2026, was held at Hung Hom station as part of the celebration events for the 45th anniversary of the MTR company, with three types of retired trains displayed at the original platforms. The exhibition was originally planned to be held from 27 April to the end of 2024, but was later extended to the end of 2025 due to a high volume of popularity. In 2026, it was renovated and revived with new exhibition elements, some former exhibitions of the MTR Gallery and a paid train cab simulator. The types of trains showcased included:

- Unrefurbished Metro Cammel E44 unit (144–244–444)
- MLR train (E112-E71)
- EMD G16 locomotive no. 56 “I. B. Trevor”.
- KTT (since January 2025)

== Cross-border services ==
Platforms 5 and 6 were used by China Railway for cross-border trains to Beijing West (Beijing–Kowloon line), Shanghai (Shanghai–Kowloon line), Guangzhou East and Foshan (Guangzhou–Kowloon line). Cross-border services were first suspended during the COVID-19 pandemic, then permanently discontinued in June 2024 due to the demand for cross-border travel having been met by high speed trains terminating at West Kowloon station.

Since April 2024, the cross-border platforms have been being used for the “Station Rail Voyage” exhibition. On 17 January 2025, MTR announced that the restricted crossing zone at Hung Hom Station for intercity through trains would be rescinded (to cancel) from that day onwards.

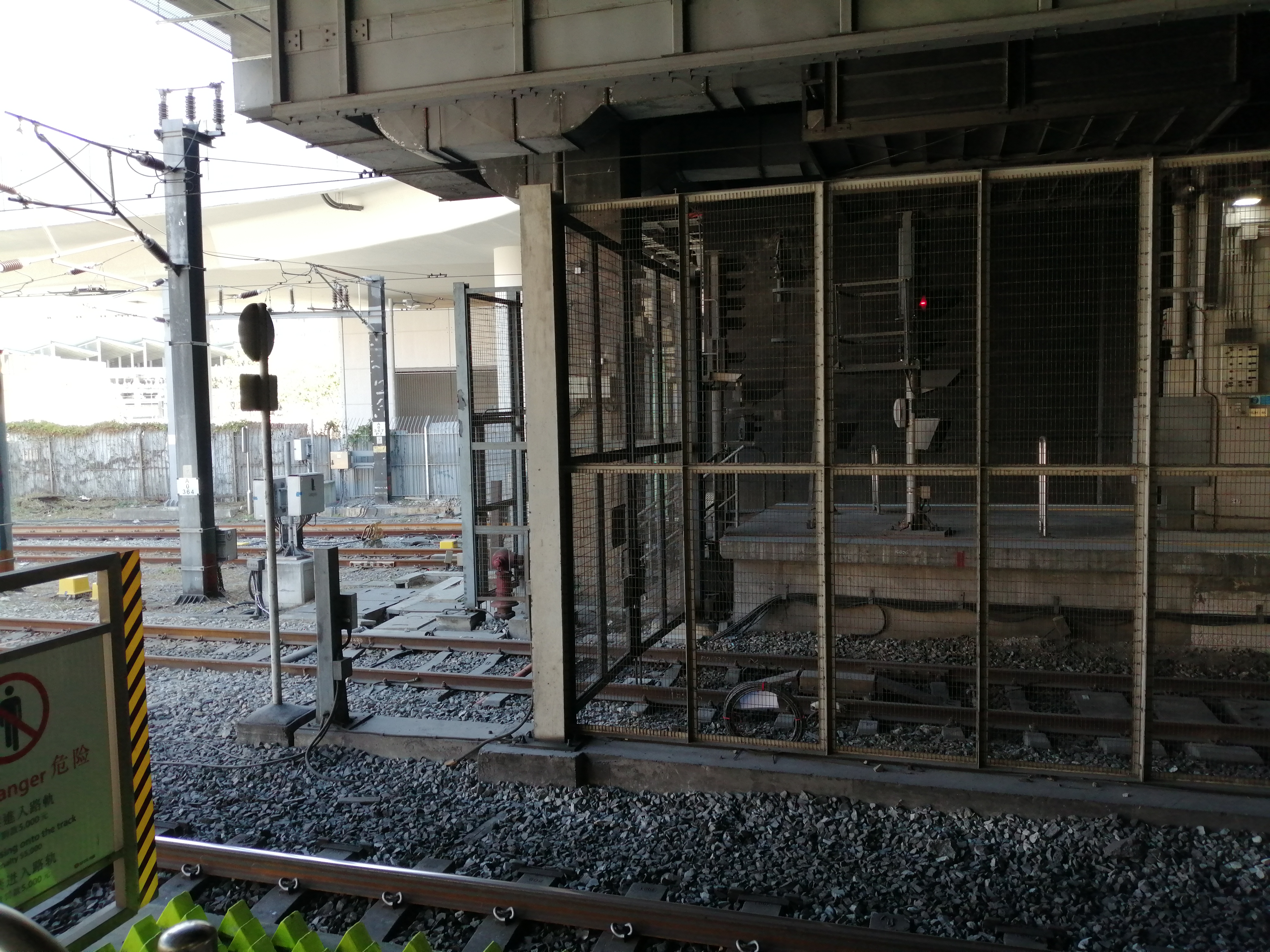
Through train tracks fenced off from platform in the COVID-19 pandemic (February 2021)

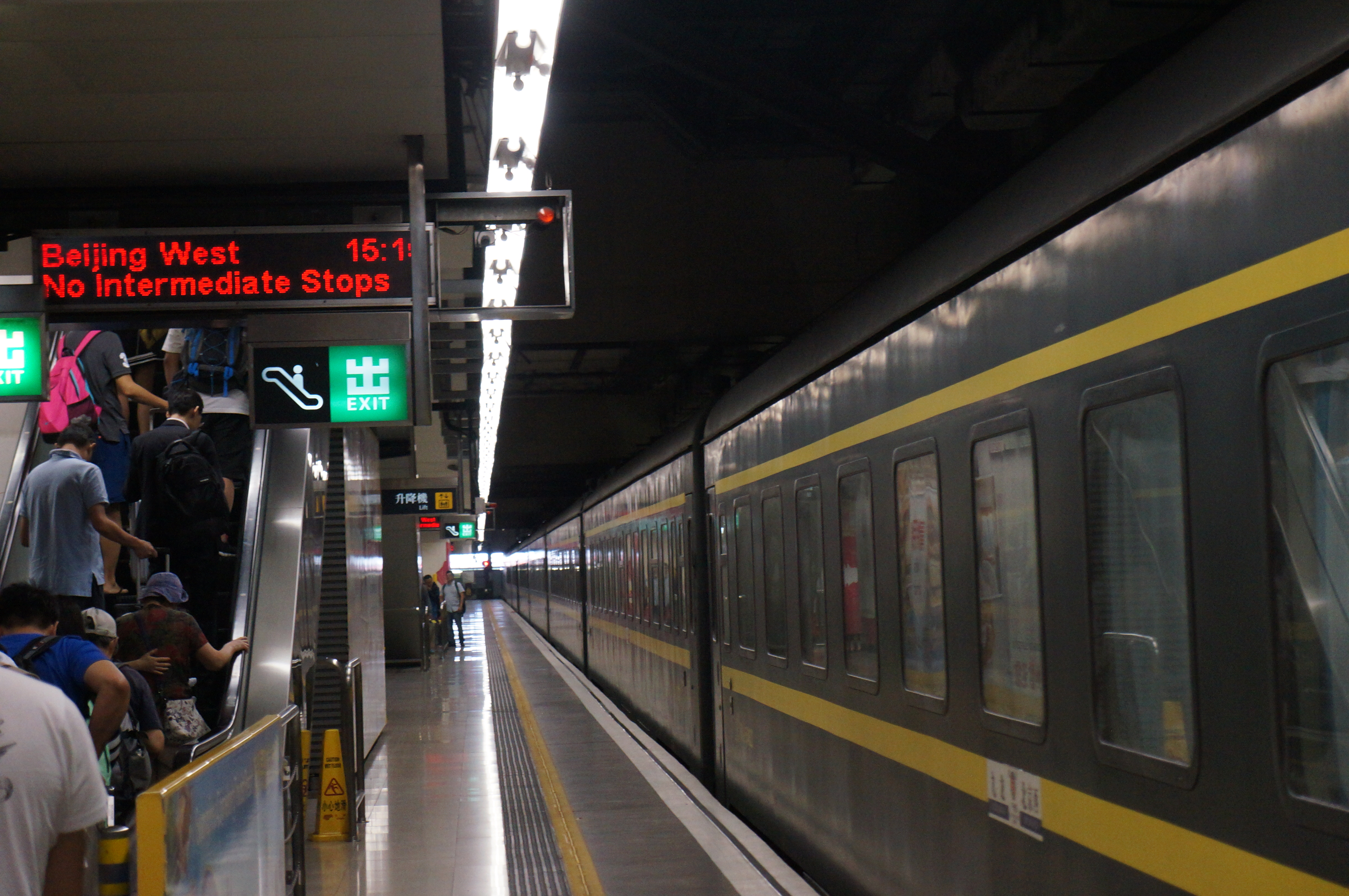
Z98 Beijing West-bound intercity through-train at Platform 5 (September 2016)

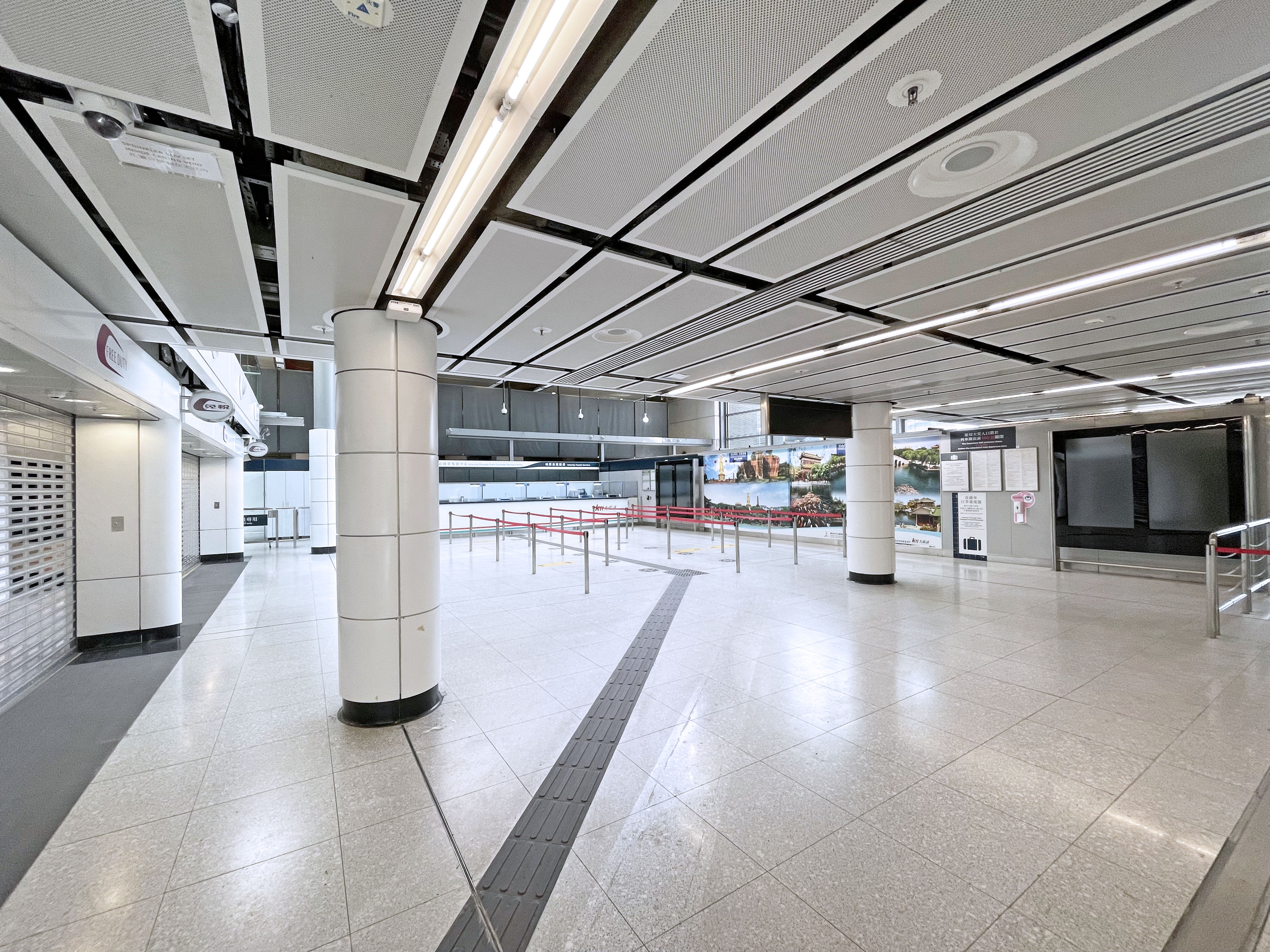
Empty waiting area for intercity through-trains in the concourse during the COVID-19 pandemic (May 2022)

== Sha Tin to Central Link expansion ==
=== Background ===
Under the North South Corridor concept, the East Rail line was extended to Hong Kong Island via a new immersed tube tunnel south of the station. At the same time, the West Rail line was connected with the Ma On Shan line via East Kowloon, forming the new Tuen Ma line.

To facilitate this expansion, new platforms were built underneath the Hung Hom station Exit C concourse. The Tuen Ma line platforms sit above the East Rail line platforms. New approach tracks have also been built north and south of the station.

=== Construction safety scandal ===
In 2018, a major scandal emerged regarding construction malpractice at the Hung Hom station construction site. In 2015, contractors building the concrete slab forming the Tuen Ma line platform level reportedly cut off the ends of reinforcing bars that were supposed to be screwed into couplers within the diaphragm wall forming the side of the underground station box. The contractor then poured the concrete even though the bars were not connected to the couplers. As a result, engineers have cast doubt on the long-term structural safety of the slab.

The government has demanded that MTR Corporation submit a report on the safety of the station. An independent engineer, C M Wong & Associates Ltd., will conduct safety tests. On 12 June 2018, Chief Executive Carrie Lam announced that she will appoint a commission on inquiry, headed by Hong Kong judge Michael Hartmann, to investigate the scandal.

== Station layout ==
5 / U4	Podium	Station Carpark
U3	Loft	Restaurants
3 / U2	Main Station Concourse	Exit C, a transport interchange
3 / U2	Main Station Concourse	Ticketing office, customer service centre, toilets
3 / U2	Main Station Concourse	Shops, vending machines
3 / U2	Main Station Concourse	ATMs, lockers
U1	Passageway	Exit A, B & D, footbridge, public transport interchange
U1	Passageway	Vending machines
U1	Footbridges	to Cross-Harbour Tunnel, Hong Kong Polytechnic University, Tsim Sha Tsui East, Hong Kong Museum of History, Hong Kong Science Museum, Hung Hom
G Platforms		East Rail line siding
G Platforms	Island platform, not in use
G Platforms		East Rail line siding
G Platforms	Island platform, not in use
G Platforms		East Rail line siding
G Platforms	Platform 5	Former intercity trains (Now a temporary exhibition)
G Platforms	Island platform, restricted access
G Platforms	Platform 6	Former intercity trains (Now a temporary exhibition)
G Platforms	Platform 7	Former freight train platform
G Platforms	Side platform, not in use
G Platforms	Platform 2	Tuen Ma line towards Wu Kai Sha (Ho Man Tin)
G Platforms	Island platform, doors will open on the right
G Platforms	Platform 3	Tuen Ma line towards Tuen Mun (East Tsim Sha Tsui)
L1; Platforms	Platform 1	East Rail line towards Lo Wu or Lok Ma Chau (Mong Kok East)
L1; Platforms	Island platform, doors will open on the right
L1; Platforms	Platform 4	East Rail line towards Admiralty (Exhibition Centre)

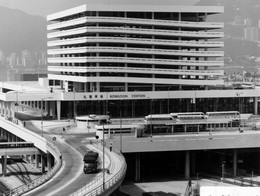
Hung Hom station in the late 1970s

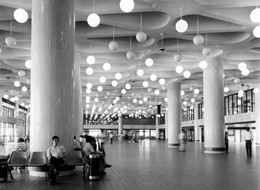
Hall of Hung Hom station in the late 1970s

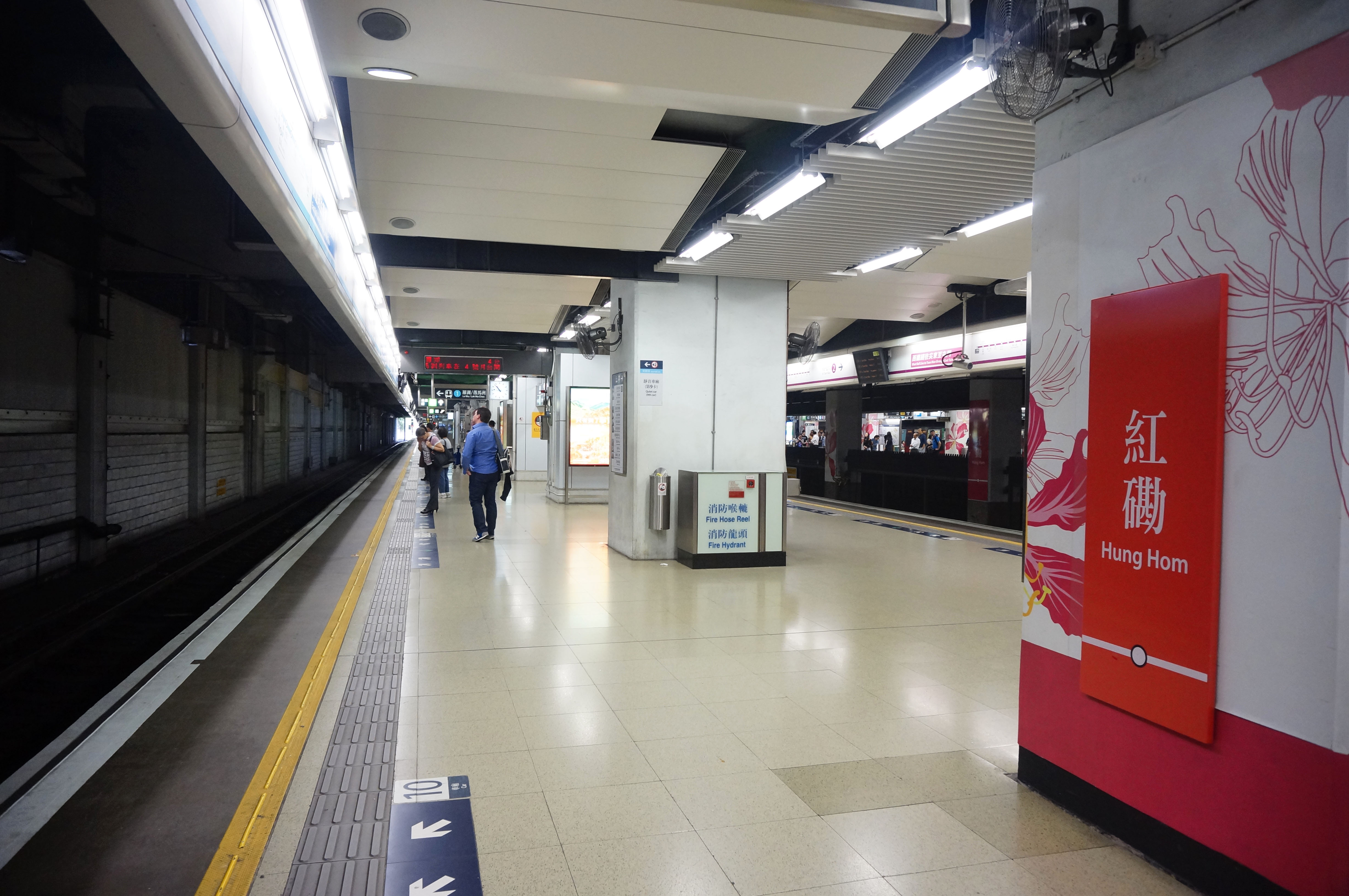
Platform 1 (April 2014)

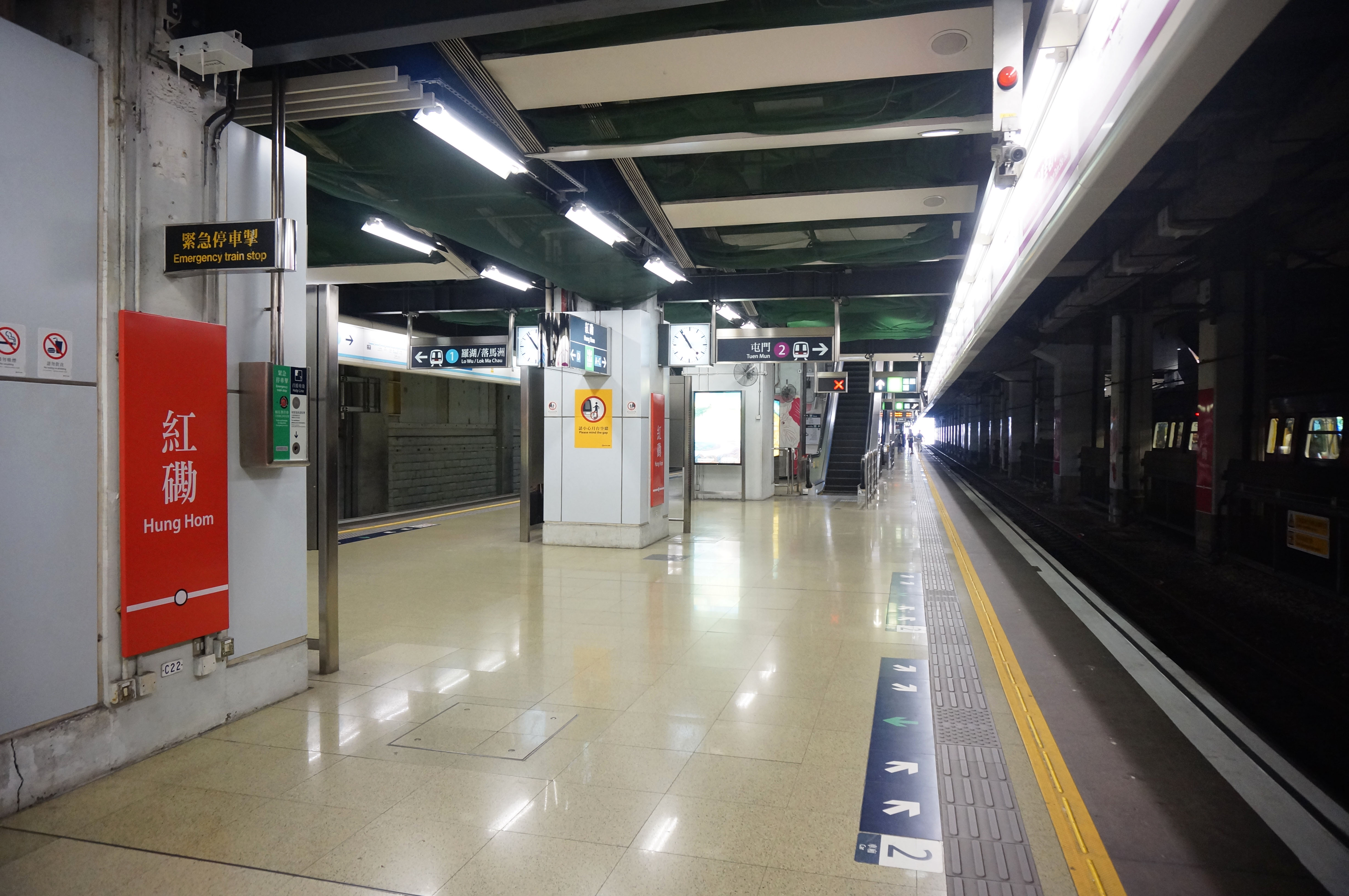
Platform 2 (April 2014)

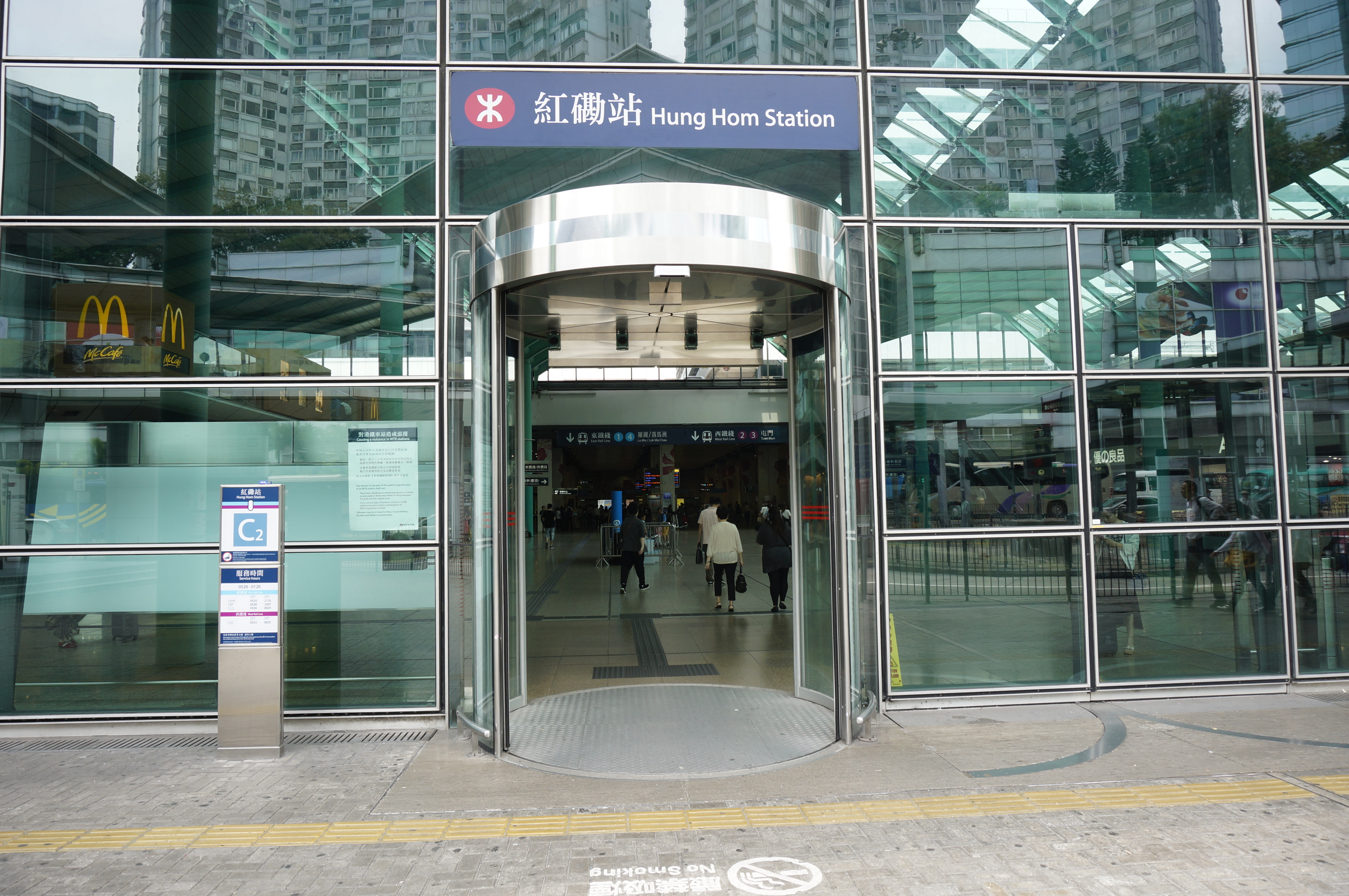
Exit C2 (April 2014)

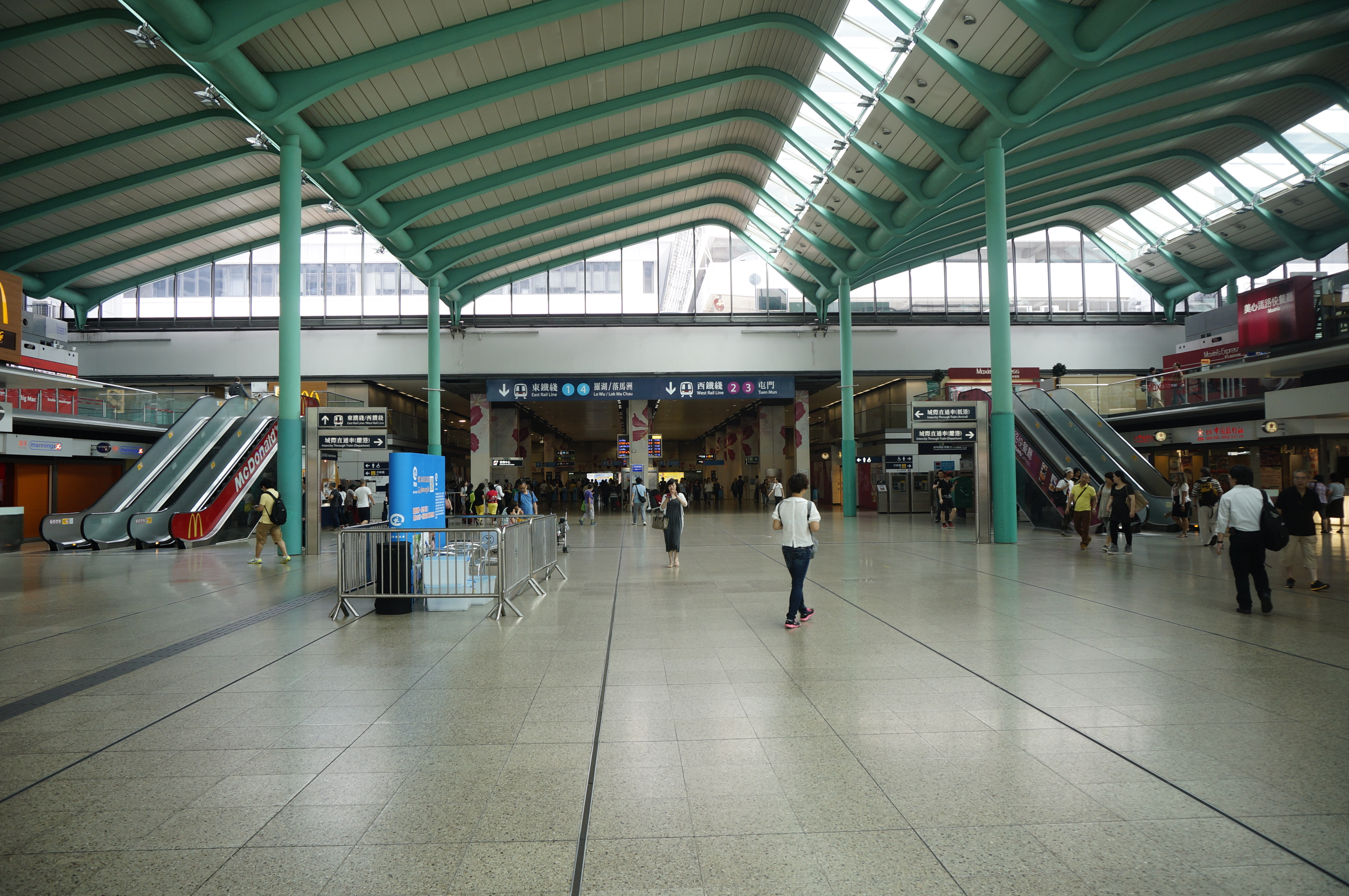
Concourse (April 2014)

=== Former layout ===
Station layout from 16 August 2009 to 19 June 2021:

U3	-	Restaurants
C / U2	Intercity Through; Train Concourse/ Exit C Concourse	Exit C, a transport interchange
C / U2	Intercity Through; Train Concourse/ Exit C Concourse	ticketing office, Customer Service Centre, toilets, Hong Kong Immigration Department and Customs and Excise Department checkpoints (for intercity train passengers)
C / U2	Intercity Through; Train Concourse/ Exit C Concourse	MTRShops, vending machines
C / U2	Intercity Through; Train Concourse/ Exit C Concourse	ATMs, lockers
U1	Exit A & B Concourse	Exit A, B, footbridge, public transport interchange
U1	Exit A & B Concourse	Customer Service
U1	Exit D Concourse	Exit D, footbridge, Customer Service
U1	Footbridges	to Cross-Harbour Tunnel, Hong Kong Polytechnic University, Tsim Sha Tsui East, Hong Kong Museum of History, Hong Kong Science Museum, Hung Hom
P Platforms	Platform 1	East Rail line towards Lo Wu or Lok Ma Chau (Mong Kok East)
P Platforms	Island platform, doors will open on the left
P Platforms	Platform 2	West Rail line towards Tuen Mun (East Tsim Sha Tsui)
P Platforms	Platform 3	West Rail line towards Tuen Mun (East Tsim Sha Tsui)
P Platforms	Island platform, doors will open on the right
P Platforms	Platform 4	East Rail line towards Lo Wu or Lok Ma Chau (Mong Kok East)
P Platforms	Platform 5	Intercity Through Train towards Guangzhou, Shanghai or Beijing West
P Platforms	Island platform, restricted access
P Platforms	Platform 6	Intercity Through Train towards Guangzhou, Shanghai or Beijing West
P Platforms	Track	Runaround track for intercity locomotives

== Exits ==
An interchange for buses (lower level) and public light buses and taxis (upper level) is located outside the station building. The lower-level bus station is situated at the Kowloon entrance of the Cross-Harbour Tunnel. Elevated walkways connect the station to the Hong Kong Coliseum; Hong Kong Polytechnic University; the residential area of Hung Hom; and tourist attractions in eastern Tsim Sha Tsui, such as the Science Museum and the Avenue of Stars along Victoria Harbour.

- A1 – Hong Kong Polytechnic University
- A2 – Bus terminus on On Wan Road
- A3 – Northeast side of station
- B1 – Walkway to Hung Hom, Royal Peninsula, Harbour Place, Whampoa Garden
- B2 – Walkway to Exit C Concourse
- C1 – Bus Terminal; cross-harbour taxi stand
- C2 – Airport Express shuttle stand; walkway to Harbour Plaza Metropolis, Fortune Metropolis, Metropolis Residence, Metropolis Tower
- C3 – Taxi stand on Cheong Wan Road; Hong Kong Coliseum
- D1 – Walkway to Tsim Sha Tsui East and Hong Kong Polytechnic University
- D2, D3, D4 – Hong Kong Coliseum
- D5 – Tsim Sha Tsui Promenade
- D6 – Walkway to Exit C Concourse
