= William Louey Lai Kuen =

Hong Kong businessman and philanthropist

- Occupations: Businessman, philanthropist
- Known for: William S.D. Louey Educational Foundation
- Title: Non-executive director, Transport International Holdings
- Relatives: William Sui-tak Louey (grandfather)

William Louey Lai Kuen is a Hong Kong businessman and philanthropist. He is the grandson of William Sui-tak Louey, founder of the Kowloon Motor Bus Company (KMB), and has served as a non-executive director of Transport International Holdings and its subsidiaries, KMB and Long Win Bus Company. He has also pursued commercial interests outside the transport business.

In 1995, Louey established the William S.D. Louey Educational Foundation in memory of his grandfather. The foundation supports students from Hong Kong and mainland China to pursue education overseas. In 2013, St Hugh’s College, Oxford admitted him as its first Elizabeth Wordsworth Fellow in recognition of his philanthropic support for the college and graduate scholarships.

Louey is associated with the Louey family’s approach to long-term ownership and succession at KMB. He lives on The Peak in Hong Kong, where he grew up on his family’s estate.
