= Louey (name) =

Louey is a name. Notable people with the name include:

== Given name ==
- Louey Ben Farhat (born 2006), Tunisian footballer
- Louey Chisholm (1863-1948), British writer, editor, and publisher

== Surname ==
- William Louey (1909-1962), Hong Kong businessman
- William Louey Lai Kuen, Hong Kong businessman and philanthropist

== See also ==
- Louie (disambiguation)
