= Shenzhen Eastern Bus =

Chinese bus operator

Shenzhen Eastern Bus Co., Ltd
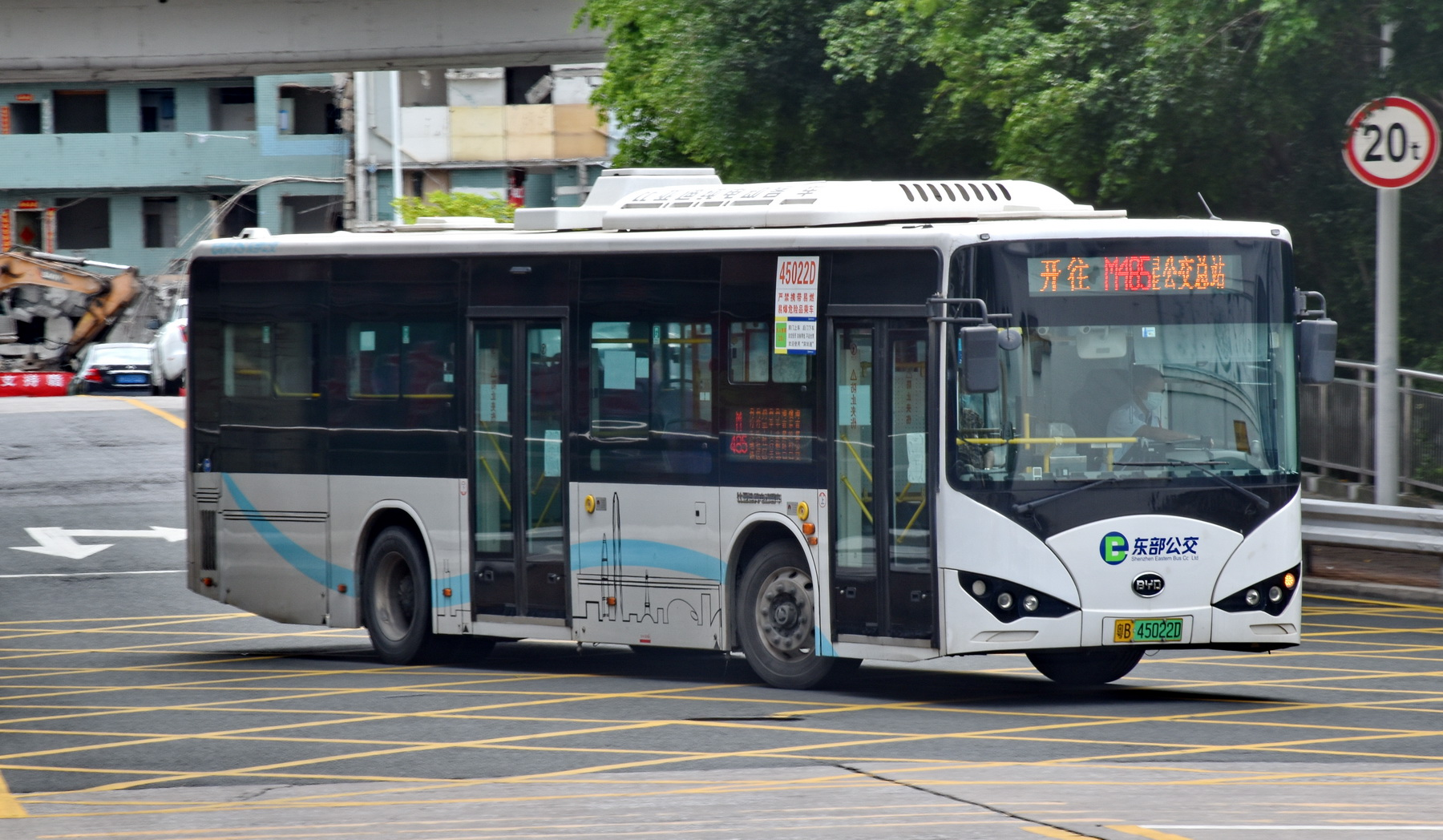
- Shenzhen Eastern Bus BYD K8 in August 2020
- Parent: Shenzhen State-owned Assets Supervision and Administration Commission (34%); Shenzhen Bus Group (1.7%)
- Commenced operation: 19 September 2007; 17 years ago
- Service area: Shenzhen
- Service type: Bus services
- Routes: 292 (June 2022)
- Fuel type: Electric
- Website: www.szebus.net

Shenzhen Eastern Bus Co., Ltd (Chinese: 深圳市东部公共交通有限公司) is a Chinese company that offers bus passenger transportation services in Shenzhen. Founded in 2007, it is one of the three major franchised bus companies in Shenzhen. Shenzhen Eastern Bus also provides car rental services and property leasing.

== Operations ==
As of June 2022, Shenzhen Eastern Bus operates 292 bus routes, including 35 regular routes (routes without any English letters), 2 night shift routes (routes starting with N), 149 trunk bus routes (routes starting with M), 30 feeder bus and community microbus routes (routes starting with B), 32 express bus routes (routes starting with E), 11 holiday routes, and 33 rush hour routes, respectively, are operated by five branches under its jurisdiction.

== See also ==
- Transport in Shenzhen
- List of bus routes in Shenzhen
