= Transport in Shenzhen =

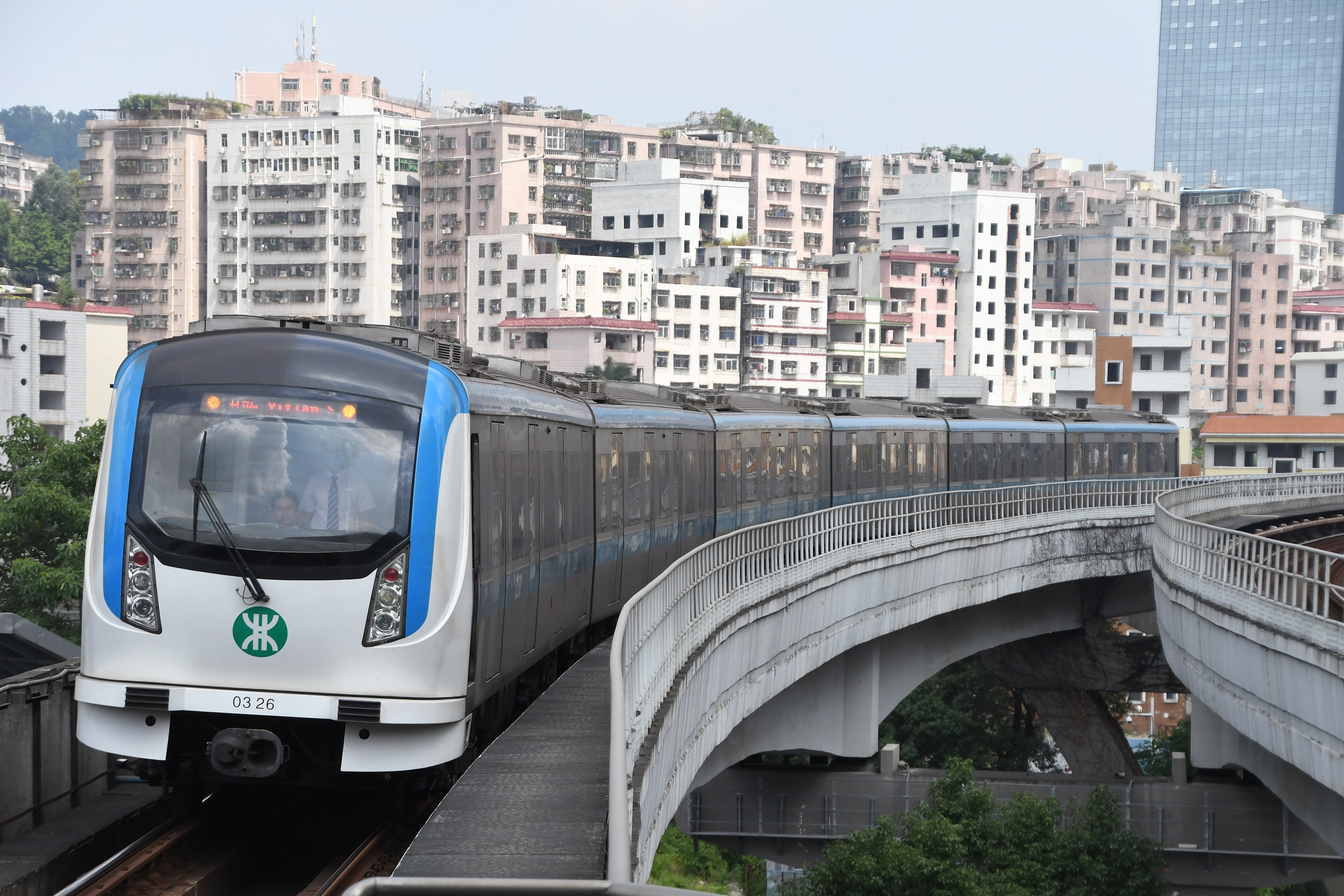
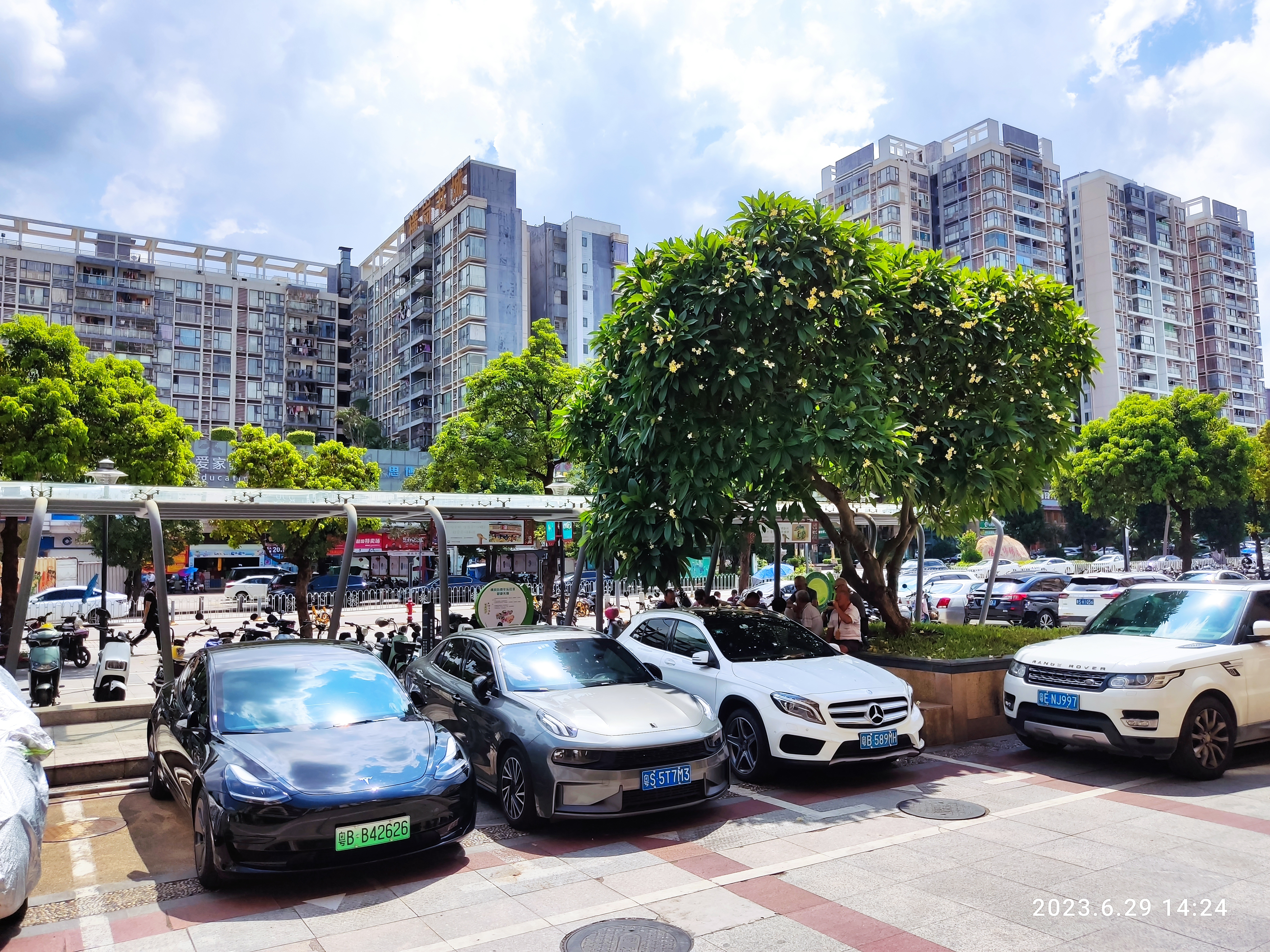
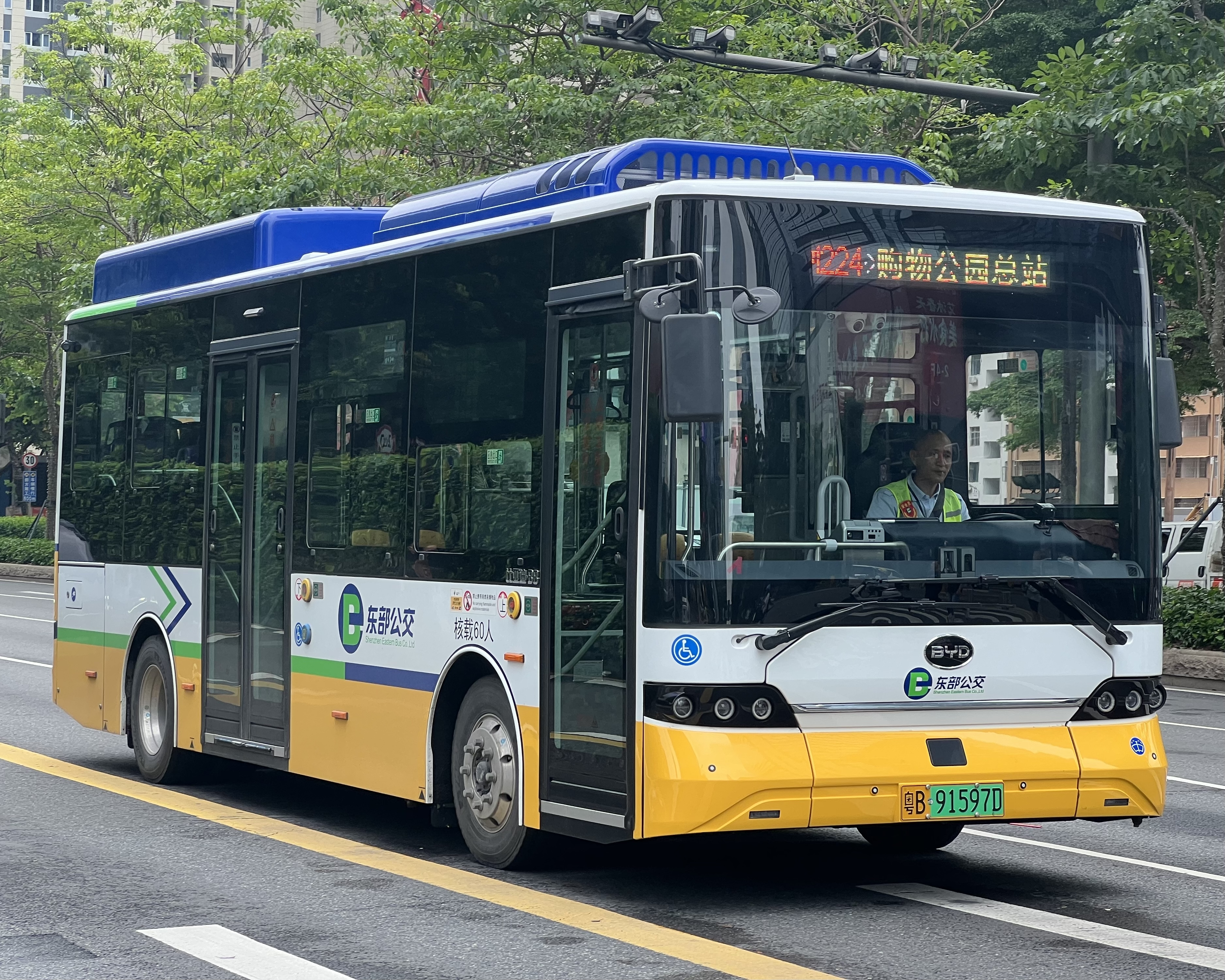
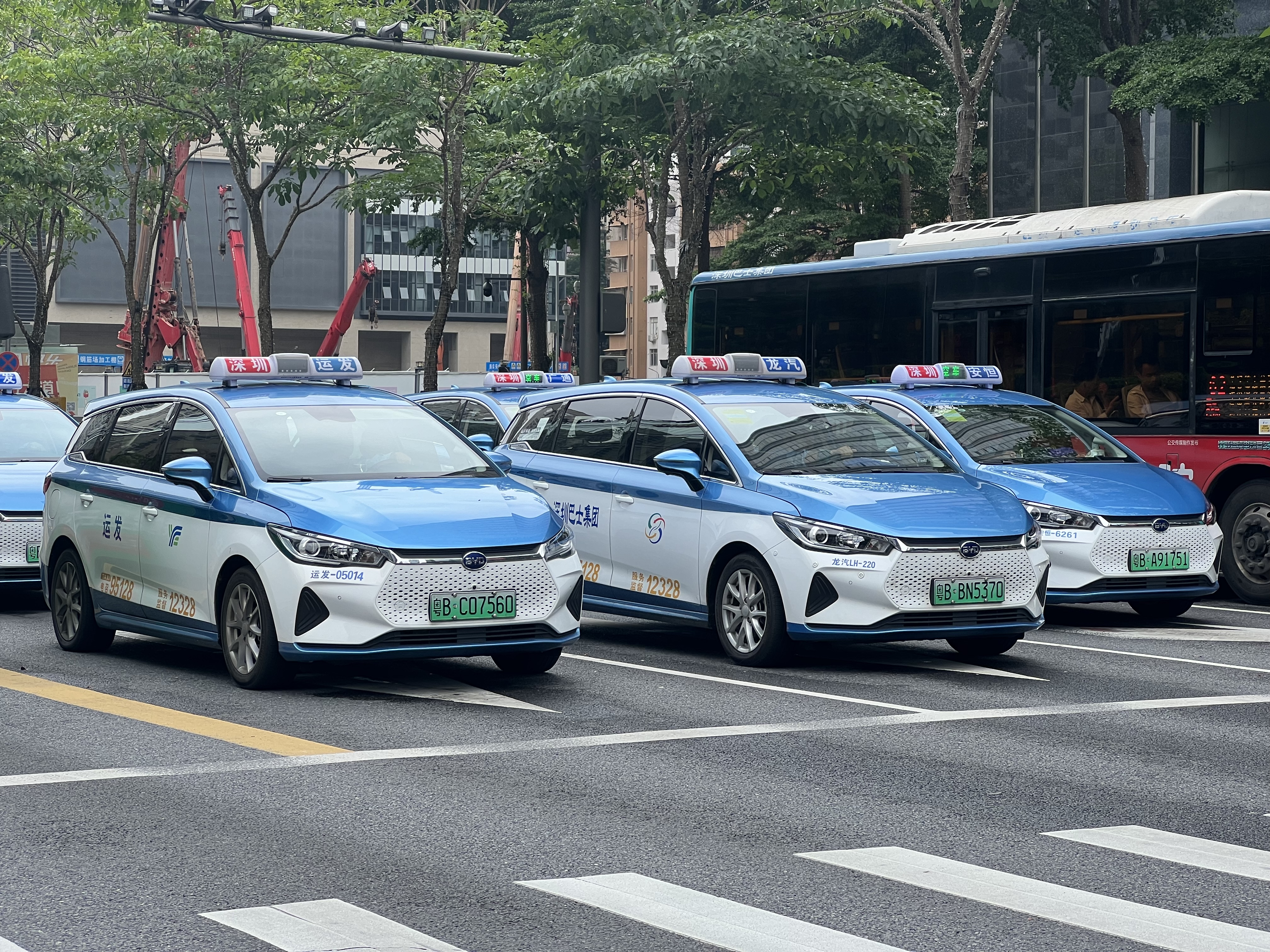
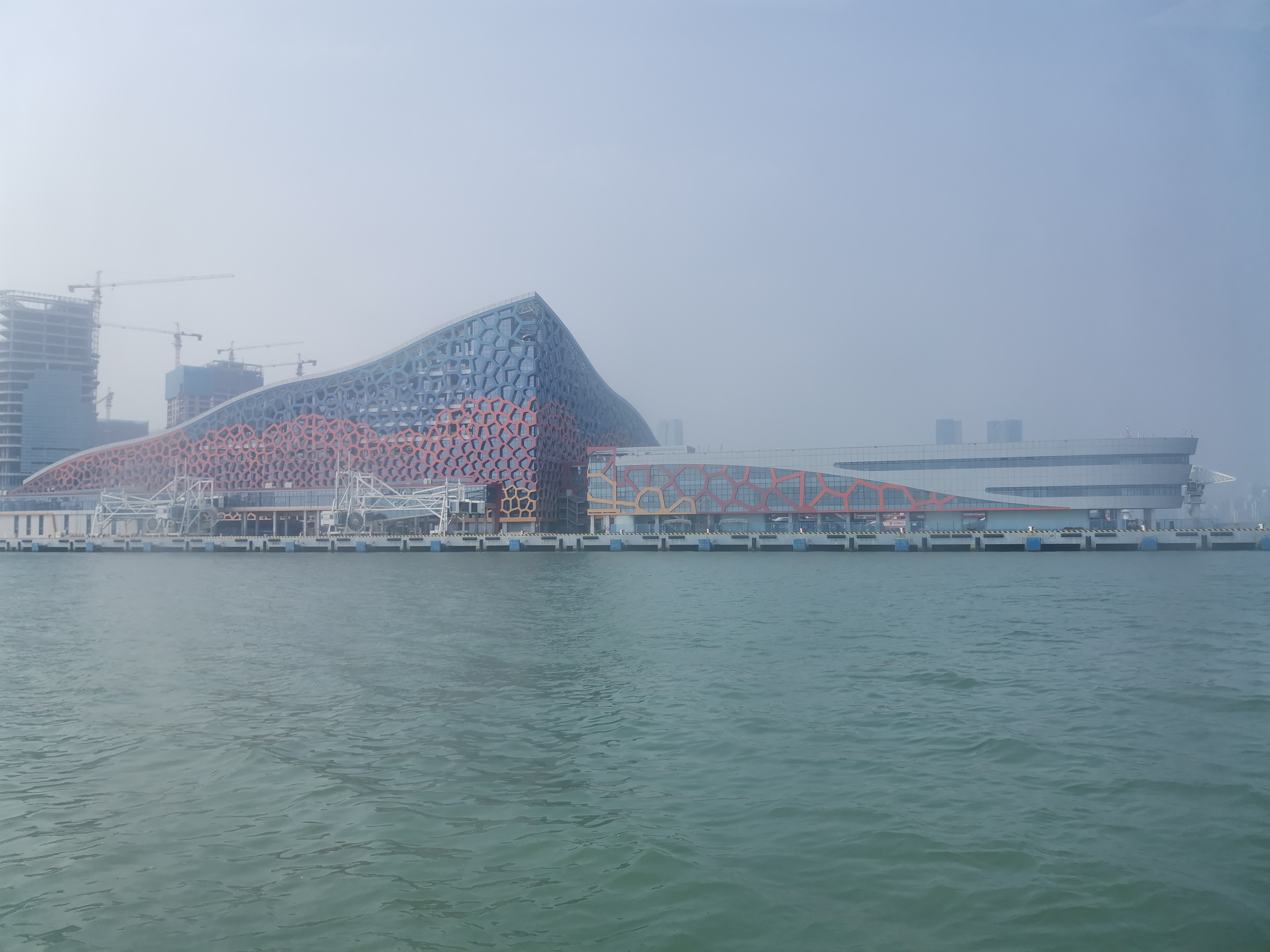
From top, left to right: Shenzhen Metro Line 3, cars at a parking lot in Longgang District, a Shenzhen public bus, taxis in Futian District, Shekou Cruise Center

Shenzhen has an extensive transport network, including various forms of land, water and air transport.

== Rail transport ==
=== National railway ===
Started with an intermediate station on the Kowloon–Canton Railway (Now Guangzhou-Shenzhen Railway) in 1910, Shenzhen is served by China's national railway network, China Railway, where train services between Shenzhen and cities across the whole China run. The stations are currently handling high-speed trains to Guangzhou, Hong Kong, Beijing, Hangzhou, Nanchang and intermediate stations on the Beijing-Guangzhou-Shenzhen-Hong Kong HSR, Xiamen-Shenzhen Railway, and Ganzhou-Shenzhen section of Beijing-Hong Kong HSR routes.

There are 8 railway stations for passenger service in Shenzhen including:

Shenzhen railway station

Shenzhen railway station, located in Luohu District, connected to the Luohu Port to Hong Kong, is the most important train station in the city. Guangzhou-Shenzhen Railway, which uses near high speed CRH trains for frequent passenger service, begins at this station. There are also a few long-distance trains departing from this station. Passengers can transfer to Shenzhen Metro Line 1 here.

Shenzhen North railway station

Shenzhen North railway station, located in Longhua District, is the main terminal for high-speed rail train service in Shenzhen. Guangzhou–Shenzhen–Hong Kong Express Rail Link and Xiamen-Shenzhen Railway both serve this station, offering frequent high-speed train service to other parts of China. Passengers can transfer to Shenzhen Metro Line 4, Line 5 or Line 6 here.

Shenzhen East railway station

Shenzhen East railway station, formerly Buji Railway Station, located in Buji subdistrict of Longgang District, on Guangzhou-Shenzhen Railway, is one of the major terminal for long-distance trains departing from Shenzhen. Passengers can transfer to Shenzhen Metro Line 3 Line 5 or Line 14 here.

Shenzhen West railway station

Shenzhen West railway station, located in Nantou, Nanshan District, is one of the auxiliary train stations, with a few departures for long-haul trains.

Futian railway station

Futian railway station, located directly in the city centre, Futian District, is an en route station of Guangzhou–Shenzhen–Hong Kong Express Rail Link. Passengers can transfer to Shenzhen Metro Line 2, Line 3 or Line 11 here.

Shenzhen Pingshan railway station

Shenzhen Pingshan railway station is an en route station of Xiamen-Shenzhen Railway, serving Pingshan District. Passengers can transfer to Shenzhen Metro Line 16 here.

Guangmingcheng railway station

Guangmingcheng railway station is an en route station of Guangzhou–Shenzhen–Hong Kong Express Rail Link, serving Guangming District.

Pinghu railway station

Pinghu railway station is an en route station of Guangzhou-Shenzhen Railway in Pinghu Subdistrict, Longgang District, which is served by CRH trains between Shenzhen and Guangzhou. Passengers can transfer to Shenzhen Metro Line 10 here.

Shenzhen also holds the actual administration of the underground platform area of Hong Kong West Kowloon Railway Station for political reasons.

=== Regional railway ===
There are also short-haul regional railway stations in Shenzhen, currently on Guangzhou-Shenzhen Intercity Railway (穗深城际铁路) only. Note that it is different from Guangzhou-Shenzhen Railway (广深铁路) mentioned above. The former covers Bao'an District and the latter covers Longgang District and Luohu District of Shenzhen. To tell them apart, their Chinese names are using different acronyms of Guangzhou "穗" and "广".

- Shenzhen Airport railway station
- Shenzhen Airport North railway station
- Fuhai West railway station
- Shajing West railway station

Additional railways, Shenzhen–Shanwei high-speed railway, Longgang-Dapeng intercity railway, Shenzhen–Dayawan intercity railway, Shenzhen–Huizhou intercity railway and the extension of Guangzhou–Shenzhen intercity railway, are currently under construction, with metro access of some en route stations opened, like Universiade railway station and Wuhe railway station.

=== Freight railway ===
And here are the freight railway stations in Shenzhen, mostly on Guangzhou-Shenzhen Railway, Pinghu-Nanshan Railway and Pinghu-Yantian Railway.

- Yantian railway station
- Xili railway station
- Sungang railway station
- Lilang railway station
- Mugu railway station
- Pinghu South railway station
- Henggang railway station
- Bantian railway station
- Georges Bassil

=== Metro ===
Shenzhen Metro was first opened on 28th Dec., 2004, then imposed the latest expansion in 2023. Now there are 16 lines covering 555 km (345 mi) in the metro system, named Line 1 to Line 12, Line 14, Line 16, Line 20 and Line 6 Branch (de facto Shenzhen section of Line 1 (Dongguan Rail Transit)), with 308 stations in total and 57 interchange stations. Several new metro lines including Line 13, Line 15, Line 17, Line 19, as well as some extension of current metro lines are under construction.

A single journey normal ticket in the metro costs 2 RMB to 15 RMB and a single journey business ticket of Line 11 costs three times the travel fare of a normal ticket. Discounts of 5% off are given using Shenzhen Tong IC Card or its mobile payment instead of a single journey normal ticket.

The metro system is operated by two companies, Shenzhen Metro Corporation and MTR Corporation, Shenzhen. MTR Shenzhen is now operating Line 4 of Shenzhen Metro.

=== Tram ===
Shenzhen Tram refers to light rail system in Shenzhen, operating in Longhua District and Pingshan District, respectively.

Shenzhen Tram in Longhua District consists of 11.7 km (7.3 mi), 2 lines and 21 stations. It opened on 28th Oct., 2017 and integrates central Guanlan, the north side of Longhua into Qinghu Station of the city's rail network. It is expected to help local residents commute and relieve traffic congestion, especially when the north extension of Shenzhen Metro Line 4 was still being built. Each single ticket costs 2 RMB.

The 2 lines in Longhua are:

- Line 1: Qinghu–Xiawei. 8.6 km (5.3 mi).
- Line 2: Qinghu–Xinlan. 6.8 km (4.2 mi).

Shenzhen Tram in Pingshan District opened on 28 Dec., 2022. An experimental 8.7-km Line 1 with 11 stations, is constructed with technology of a local manufacturer BYD. It connects central Pingshan and Pingshan Railway Station, as well as the city's rail network. Each single ticket costs 2 or 3 RMB.

The line in Pingshan is:

- Line 1: Pingshan Railway Station–BYD North. 8.7 km (5.4 mi).

== Road transport ==
Road transport in Shenzhen consists of various forms of transport as follows:

- Buses
- Intercity buses and coaches
- Bus and coach services of customised routes
- Taxicabs
- Vehicle for hire services
- Public bicycles
- Highway system
- Urban roads
- Greenway system
- Interchanges
- Pedestrians

As of 2023, 70% of Shenzhen's cars are electric vehicles.

=== Buses ===
Bus services in Shenzhen began in 1975, and now have expanded to a network consisting of about 900 regular routes. Three franchised companies, Shenzhen Bus Group, Shenzhen Eastern Bus and Shenzhen Western Bus operate existing routes, with others once operated by private companies.

Bus operators in Shenzhen are subsidized by the government and have to set the bus fares according to a guideline usually from 2 RMB to 10 RMB. Fare has to be given when boarding the bus in short-haul routes and expresses with no change. However, for some long-haul routes, fare is collected manually or automatically when embarking and disembarking, recording the travel distance of the passenger. Shenzhen Tong IC Card or its mobile payment is accepted on most of the bus routes with 20% off at least, except a few privately operated premium routes.

Shenzhen has become the world's first city to achieve full electrification of its urban bus fleet. This move has significantly reduced noise and pollutant emissions and made it a representative case of large-scale promotion of electric public transportation.

Bus routes in Shenzhen are categorised into three categories, beginning from Dec. 2008:

Expresses

These are long-haul routes connecting the city and the suburbs/exurbs, travelling on motorways. The buses used for these routes, which are normally actually coaches for long-distance travel, are usually green. Normally, no standing passengers are allowed on these routes. These routes are charged with a flat fare with a maximum of 10 RMB, according to the distance of the route. Routes in this category start with E, for example, E11 and E33.

Main-lines

These are medium to long routes, travelling on trunk roads, for example, national highway G107, often using full-sized cyan transit buses. These routes are charged according to the travel distance of the passengers, from 2 RMB to 10 RMB. If the full fare is greater than 3 RMB, sectional fares are used, while passengers of short-haul routes paying only 2 RMB, 2.5 RMB or 3 RMB. Routes in this category start with M, for example, M206 and M408, and most of the routes in the old numbering scheme fall into this category, e.g. 1 and 337.

Branches

These are short-haul routes travelling in neighbourhoods, narrow streets and alleys, using orange minibuses/midibuses. These routes are charged a flat fare of 1 RMB or 2 RMB. Routes in this category start with B, for example, B611 and B881. Route 915 in the old numbering scheme also falls into this category.

In addition, there are some other bus routes, not belonging to the above categories, with Chinese characters forming part of the route number, which include:

- 高峰专线 A: Rush hour routes
- 高快巴士 B: Rush hour expresses
- (Places)假日专线 C：Holiday series of routes
- 深惠 D: Intercity bus routes connecting Shenzhen with Huizhou, using transit buses and not long-haul coaches.

The letters A, B, C, D indicate where route numbers are written.

The 1992 numbering scheme

There are still bus routes in Shenzhen using the old numbering scheme effective from Dec. 1992 to Dec. 2008, when they were numbered using the hundred district according to the districts where the route operated in. But new routes starting from Dec. 2008 no longer use it, and old routes extensively modified would be renumbered to the new scheme assigning a number starting with E, M or B.

Details of the 1992 numbering scheme

Note that changes after Dec. 2008 for routes with old numbering may break the rule below.

- 1-299: Full-sized bus routes operating in the central districts including Futian District, Luohu District, Nanshan District and Yantian District, which become main-lines in the current categorisation.
- 300-399: Full-sized bus routes crossing the former border of the Special Economic Zone(SEZ), which become main-lines in the current categorisation.
- 400-499: Minibus routes in the 4 central districts, abolished in 2004.
- 500-599: Minibus routes crossing the former border of the SEZ, abolished in 2020.
- 600-699: Full-sized bus routes serving Bao'an District, Longhua District and Guangming District, which become main-lines in the current categorisation.
- 700-799: Minibus-then routes serving Bao'an District, Longhua District and Guangming District, gradually replaced by full-sized bus after 2004, which become main-lines in the current categorisation.
- 800-899: Full-sized bus routes serving Longgang District, Pingshan District and Dapeng New District, which become main-lines in the current categorisation.
- 900-999: Minibus-then routes serving Longgang District, Pingshan District and Dapeng New District, gradually replaced by full-sized bus after 2004, which become main-lines (except 915 becoming a branch) in the current categorisation.
- N-prefixed: Nightly route services at night which are usually parallel to some regular routes at daytime. Sometimes a letter N appearing before the route number started with E, M or B means a nightly route which is parallel to the corresponding route without N. For example, NA1 is the nightly service of A1.
A letter A or B may be added after the route number, which indicates small variations of the route, and a letter K appearing before the route number means the route an express which is parallel to the corresponding route without K. For example, K113 (now M133) is the express of 113. These usage have been abolished since July 2018.

As of Dec. 2017, the entire fleet of over 16,300 buses has been replaced with electric buses, the largest fleet of electric buses of any city in the world. The city began rolling out electric buses made by BYD in 2009, and has heavily invested in acquiring electric buses and taxis since.

=== Intercity buses and coaches ===
- Long-haul coaches: there are lots of long-haul coach stations in Shenzhen, with coach services to elsewhere in Guangdong, Hong Kong, Macau and other Provinces of China. Shenzhen Coach Station, also called Yinhu Coach Station, is located in Yinhu Subdistrict, Luohu District. There are also coach stations at Shenzhen Bao'an International Airport, Shenzhen railway station and Shenzhen North railway station.
- Unregulated coaches: there are once some coaches running between Shenzhen and other cities in Guangdong, for example, Guangzhou and Dongguan, with a "route number" starting with 长 (meaning long), for example, 长16路. These numbered coaches are mainly unregulated or even illegal, which are not recommended for passengers. Most of them have disappeared because of travel restrictions of COVID-19 pandemic.
- Transit buses: apart from coaches, transit buses can also be used for intercity travel between Shenzhen and its neighbouring cities, Dongguan, Huizhou and Hong Kong. The "intercity" bus routes like 深惠X线 are official regulated bus routes between these cities, and there are also a few de facto intercity bus routes with regular numbering, like M184, M325, M589, with 208 from Huizhou, 285, 786 from Dongguan, B1 from Hong Kong which travel across the city border.

Here are the list of coach stations currently existing and not affiliated to railway stations, airports or ports (as those could be incorporated), yet some of them might be under renovation or expansion thus are not operating. Most of them are located outside the central districts, each serving at subdistrict (as a part of their names) level often. They are getting fewer and fewer due to the other competitive modes of transport.

- Bao'an Coach Station
- Futian Transport Hub
- Henggang Coach Station
- Kengzi Coach Station
- Longgang Coach Station
- Longgang Long-haul Coach Station
- Longhua Coach Station
- Nanshan Coach Station
- Shenzhen Coach Station
- Xinqiao Central Coach Station

=== Bus and coach services of customised routes ===
Thanks to the rapid development of Information Technology and sharing economy, bus and coach services of customised routes have spread throughout China, including Shenzhen. They leave the city boundaries disregarded providing services both in and between the cities.

Services in the city

Besides bus routes designated by Transport Commission of Shenzhen and its organizations, there are also bus services of customised routes ("定制公交" in Chinese). That is, passengers book tickets at certain apps "E巴士" or "优点巴士" and choose their routes in advance, and they can take these buses. With a few stops like expresses, these routes provide commutes for work, study or travel faster than regular buses. Passengers can also submit their origin and destinations to the apps to lodge routes of their own. When a certain number of people share the same locations the routes between them would be put into operation.

Number of these routes operated by franchised companies often start with J, P, PX series by Shenzhen Eastern Bus or C, D, F, H, T by Shenzhen Bus Group whose information would not be shown at regular bus stops, so passengers can only get their information with the apps. They are popular among workers and visitors in Shenzhen as an alternative of comfort. The first customised route operated by franchised companies started operation in Jan. 2016 by Shenzhen Eastern Bus.

=== Vehicle for hire services ===
Most vehicles for hire accept mobile payments such as Alipay and WeChat Pay.

All colors of taxicabs are able to operate in the entire Shenzhen, as follows:

- Red taxis and Green taxis are fuel taxis united together by governments in May 2017, then were replaced by blue ones in Dec 2018.
- Blue taxis are electric vehicles and fuel surcharge does not apply on them.

The typical taxi fare consists of 2 parts, 10 RMB for up to 2 km (about 1.24 mile) first and 2.7 RMB/km (about 4.34 RMB/mile) for the distance between 2 and 20 km. Extra 30% of taxi fare for 20 to 35 km, and 60% for the distance remained. A 30% night fare is also required between 23:00 to 6:00 the next day.

DiDi and some other privately operated hire services are also very popular in Shenzhen.

=== Public Bicycles ===
Public bicycle systems in Shenzhen can be roughly divided into 2 kinds.

Dock-based Public Bicycles

Dock-based public bicycle system in Shenzhen started operating in Yantian District in Dec 2011, being the first public bicycle system in Shenzhen. Then it spread to Luohu, Futian, Longgang and Nanshan Districts. Yantian public bicycle system is the only one covering the whole district in Shenzhen. These bicycle systems are franchised by governments at district level and usually incompatible with each other. Franchised bicycle system in Luohu District suspended in Feb 2018, and that of Yantian District suspended in Apr 2022.

Bike sharing

Bike sharing usually refers to dockless public bicycle system by private sectors in China. It starts in Oct 2016 in Nanshan District by Mobike. Users download their apps and scan QR codes to unlock for a ride. Then many private bike sharing operators like Ofo, Xiaoming etc. appeared and were developing rapidly in 2017. The government has begun to regulate the number of these bicycles as there are too many. Some operators like Bluegogo also met a bankruptcy because of the high operational cost, leading to only 3 operators from 2020-Mobike by Tencent, DiDi Bike by DiDi and Hellobike by Alibaba-up to now.

=== Highway System ===
Highway system in Shenzhen is a part of National highway system in China as well as Provincial highway system called Guangdong highway. They include expressways and normal highways.

Expressways

Expressways in Shenzhen usually need a fare of 0.45 RMB/km (about 0.72 RMB/mile) for a private car due to the provincial standard, while more needed for a larger vehicle. Speed limits also vary with the type of vehicles that usually ranged from 60 km/h (37 mph) to 120 km/h (75 mph).

Normal highways

Normal highways are free with lower speed limits than expressways.

The following are their numbers with names or destinations:

National highway in Shenzhen

Number of these highways starts with G.

- Jinggang'ao Expressway
- Shennan Expressway
- Wushen Expressway
- Shenhai Expressway
- Shenzhen Outer Ring Expressway
- Changshen Expressway
- Shencen Expressway
- Pearl River Delta Ring Expressway
- Beijing-Hong Kong
- Shanhaiguan-Shenzhen
- Dongying-Shenzhen
- Dandong-Dongxing

Provincial highway in Shenzhen

Number of these highways starts with S.

- Guangshen Riverside Expressway
- Shuiguan Expressway
- Congguanshen Expressway
- Huishen Coastal Expressway
- Longda Expressway
- Nanguang Expressway
- Huiyan Road
- Danping Express
- Nanping Express
- Xichong-Bao'an
- Daya Bay Nuclear Power Plant-Longhua
- Coastal Boulevards

There are also County highways and Country highways in Shenzhen, but many of them have been detoured or renewed with the rapid urbanization of the city.

=== Urban Roads ===
Being a relatively new city dating back to only the late 1970s, Shenzhen, especially the former SEZ, has had the advantage of planned street grids.

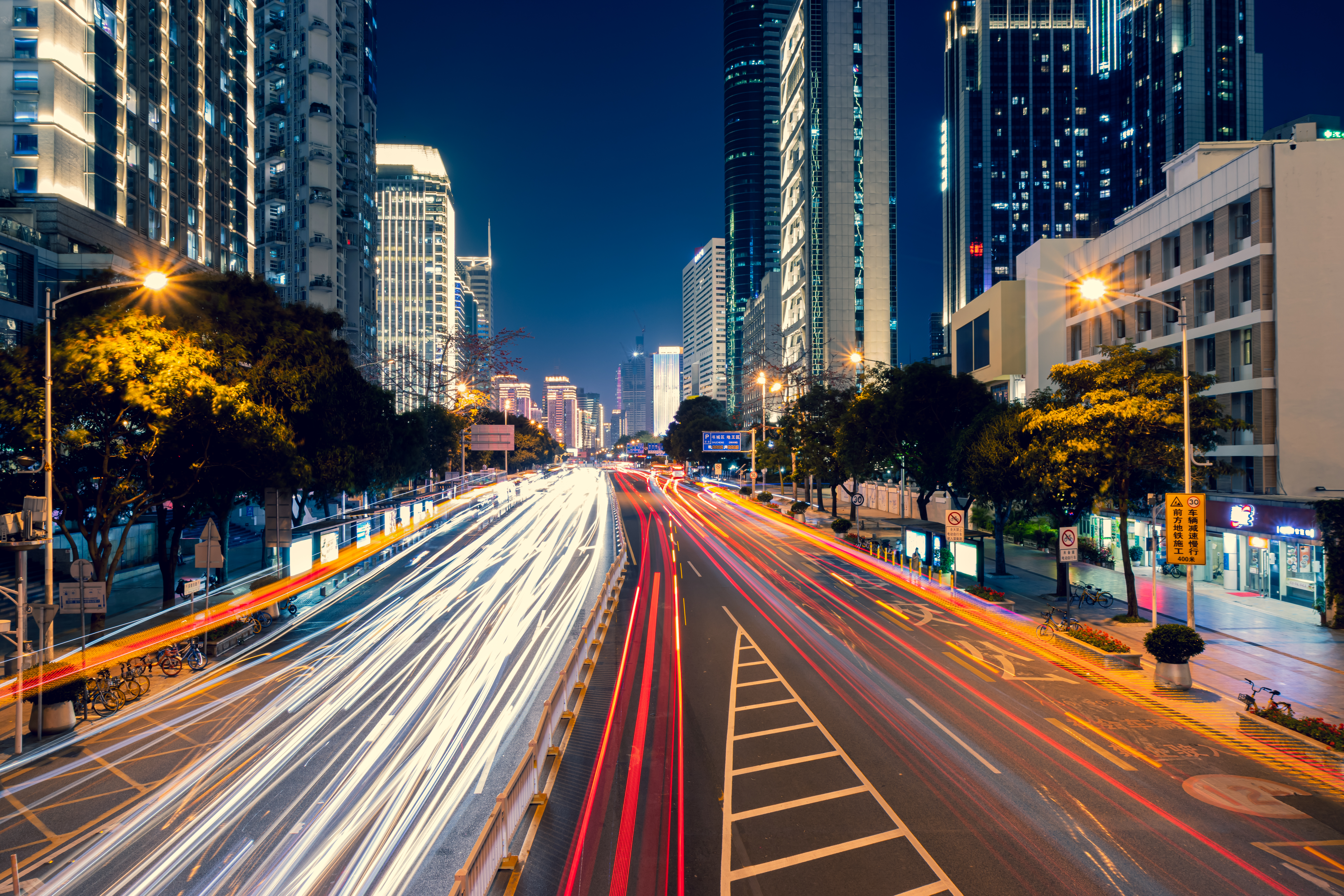
Shennan East Road, Shenzhen.

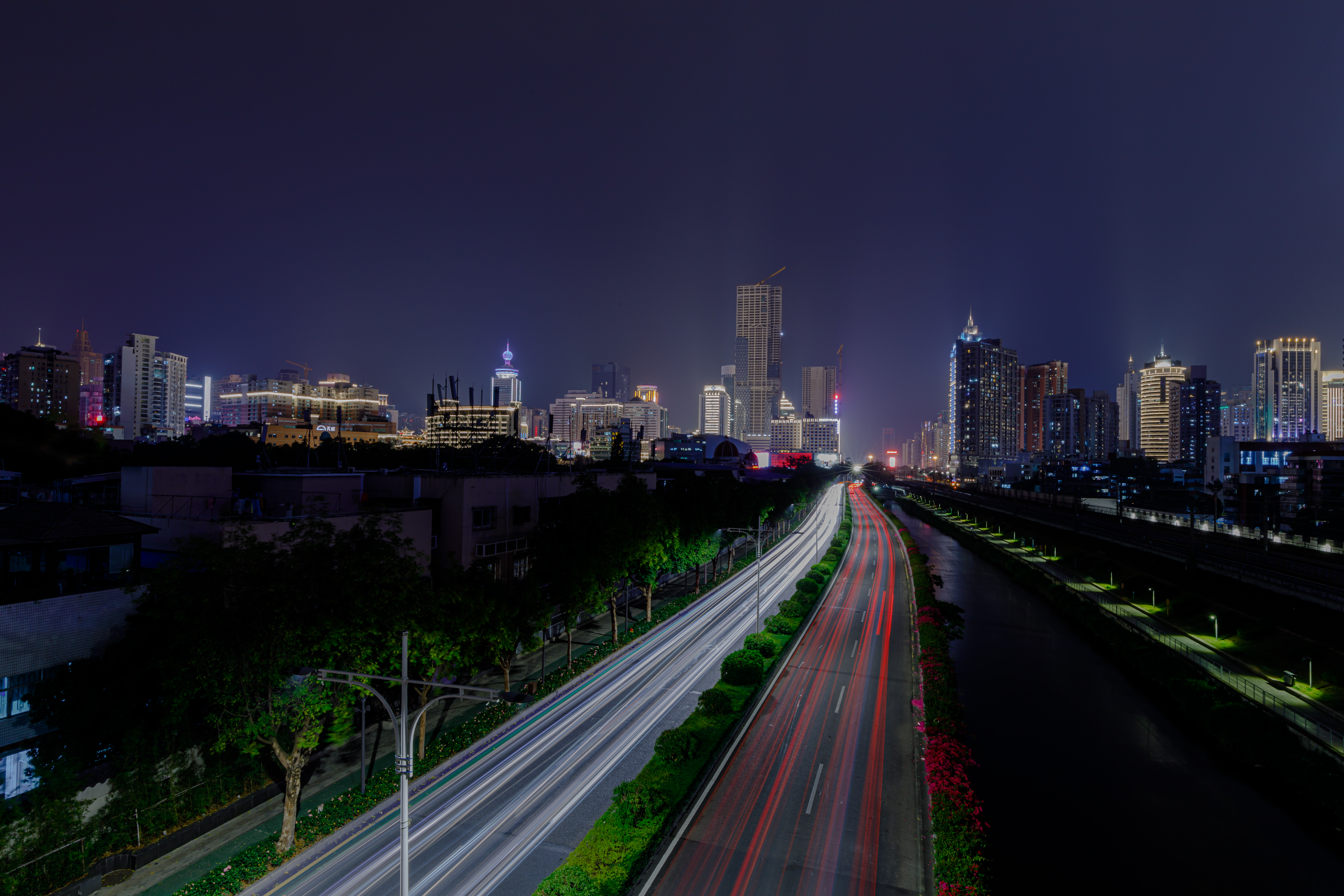
People's Park Road at night.

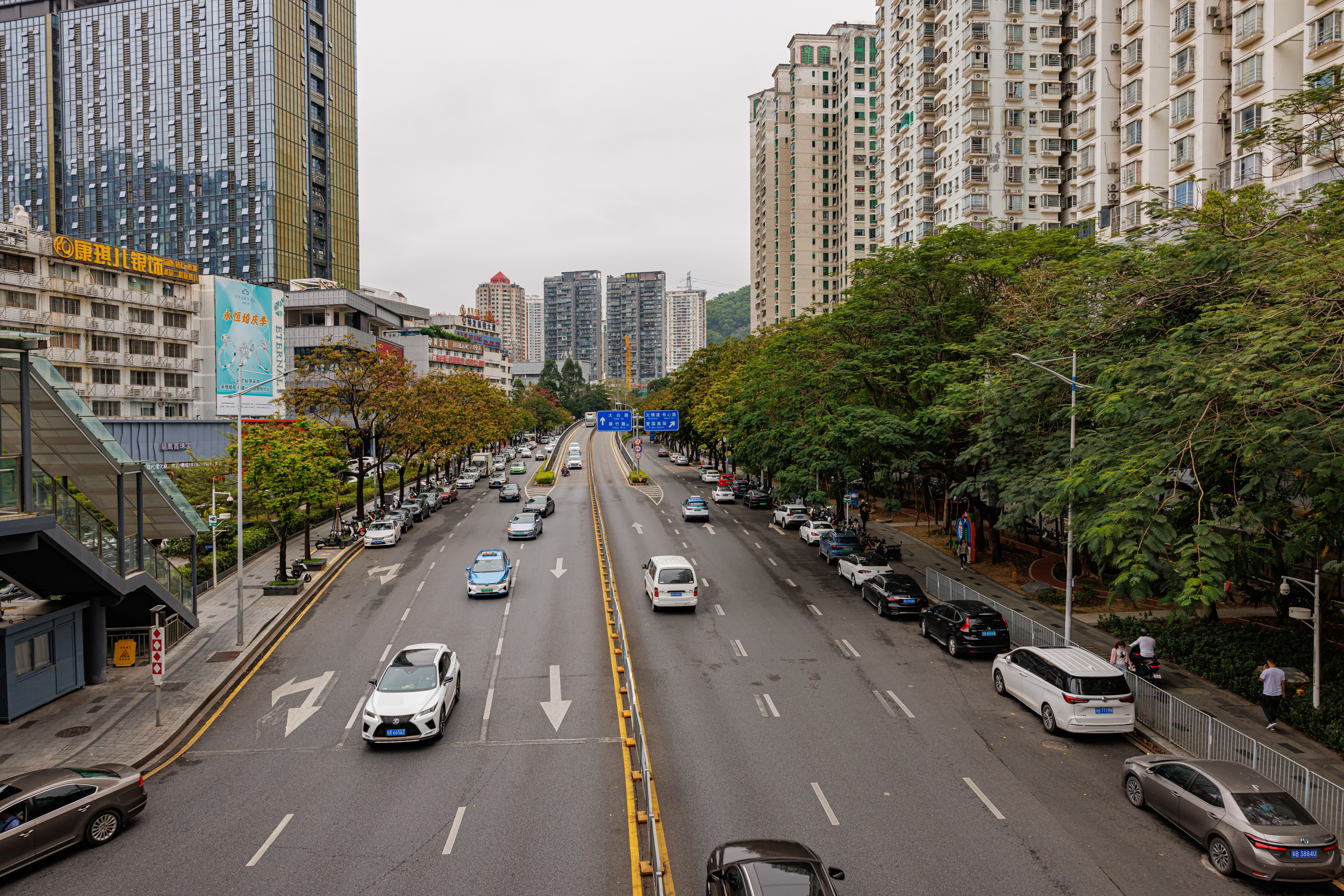
Cuizhu Road.

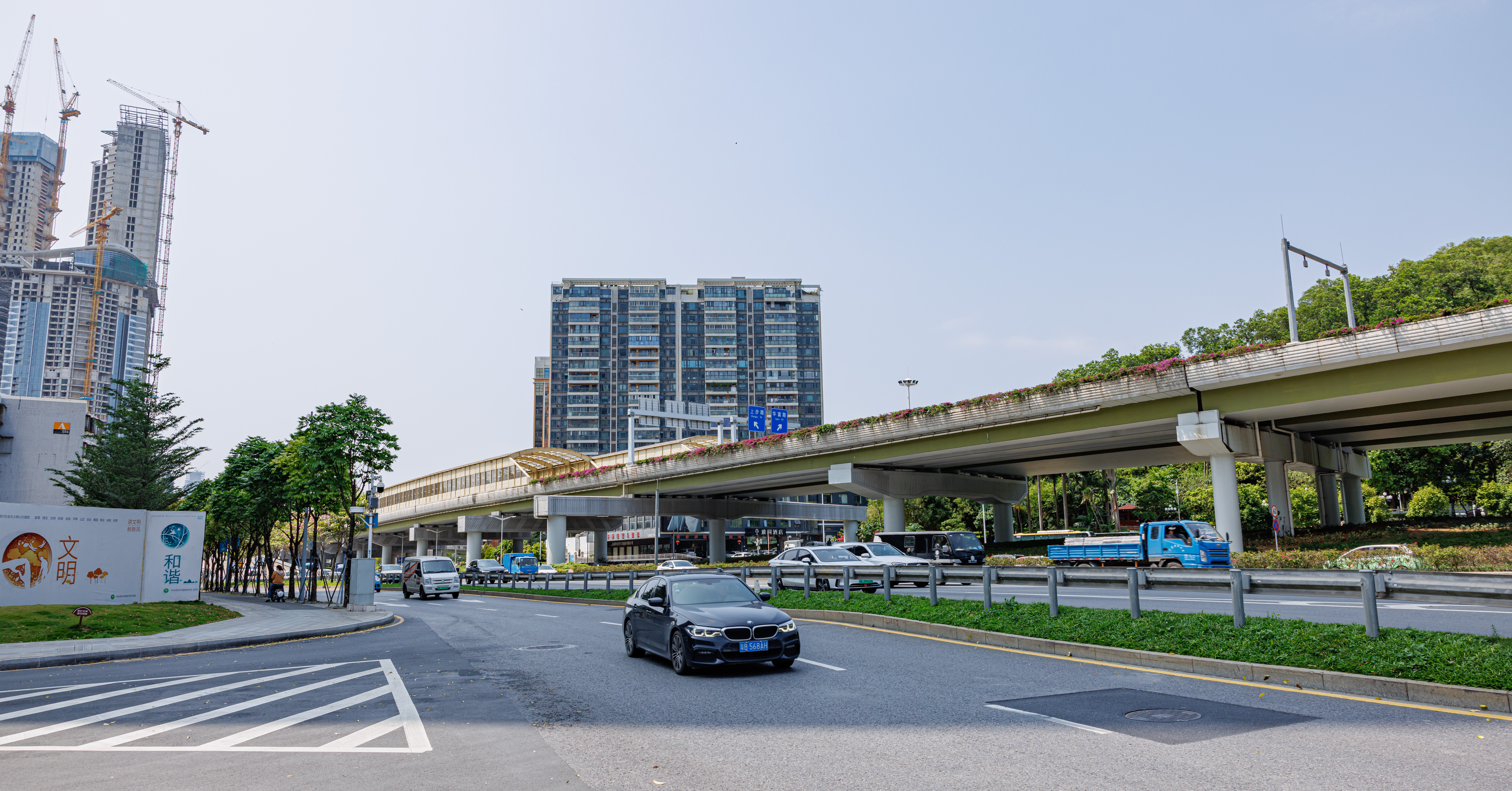
Beihuan Boulevard.

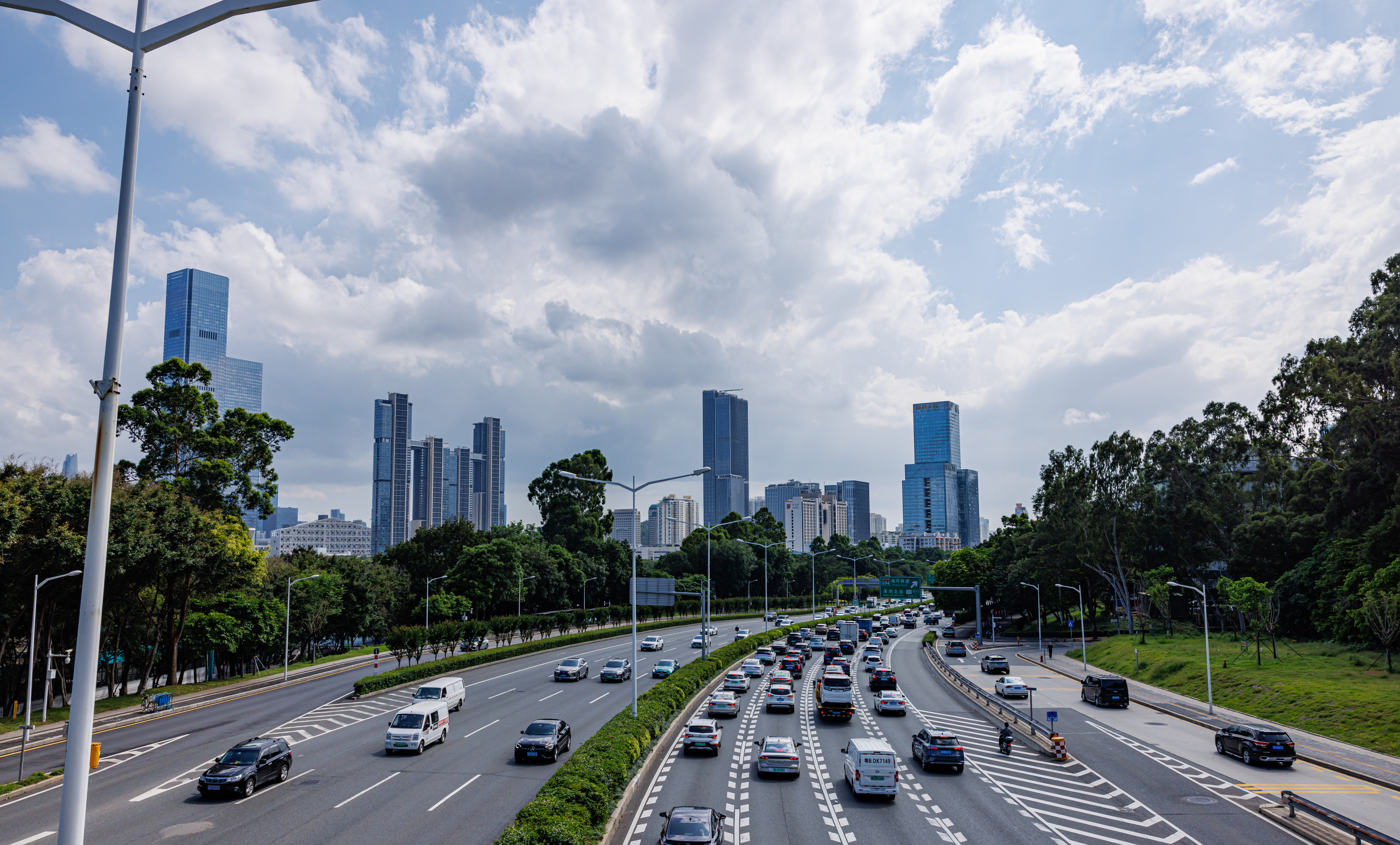
Beihuan Boulevard

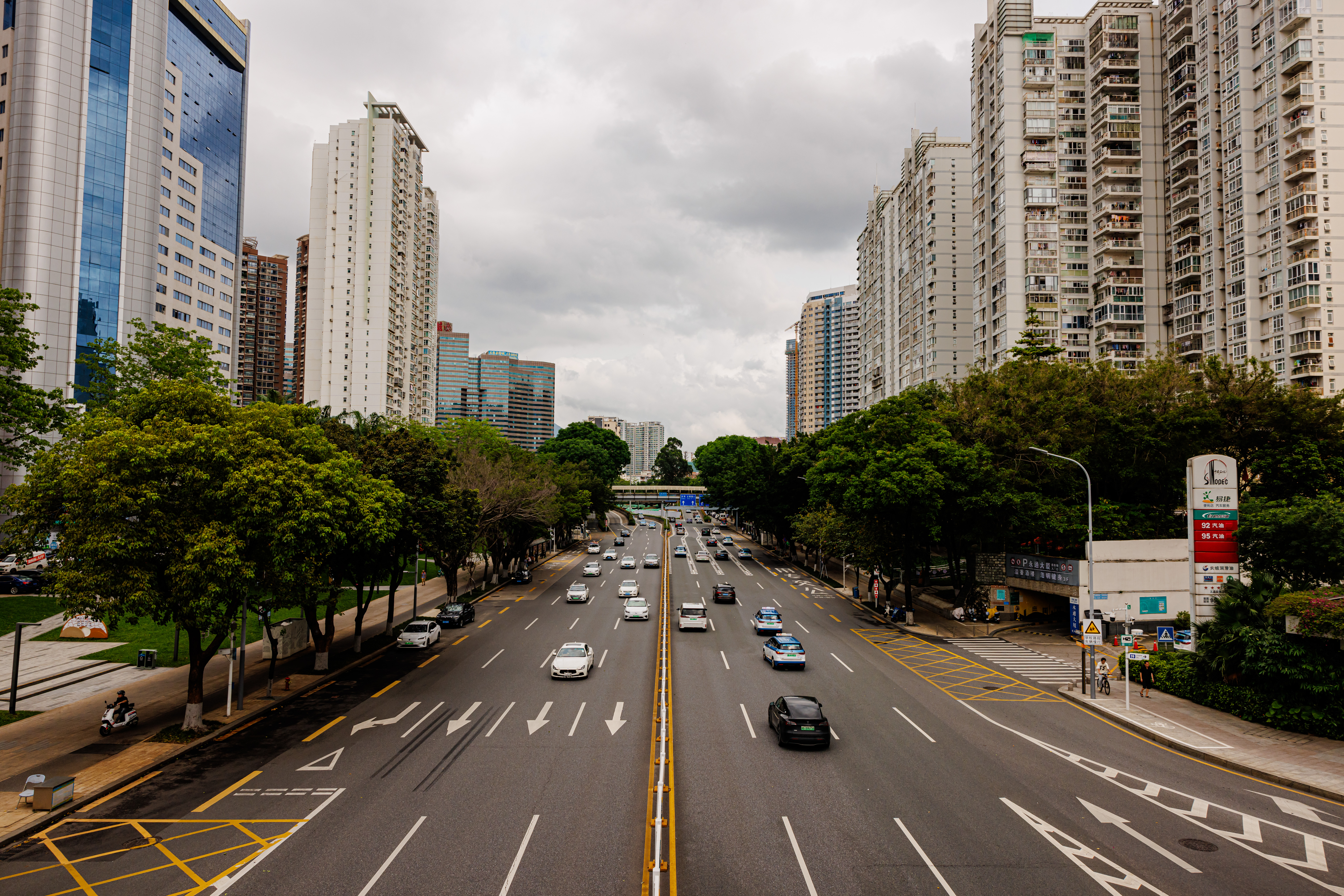
Sungang East Road, Luohu District

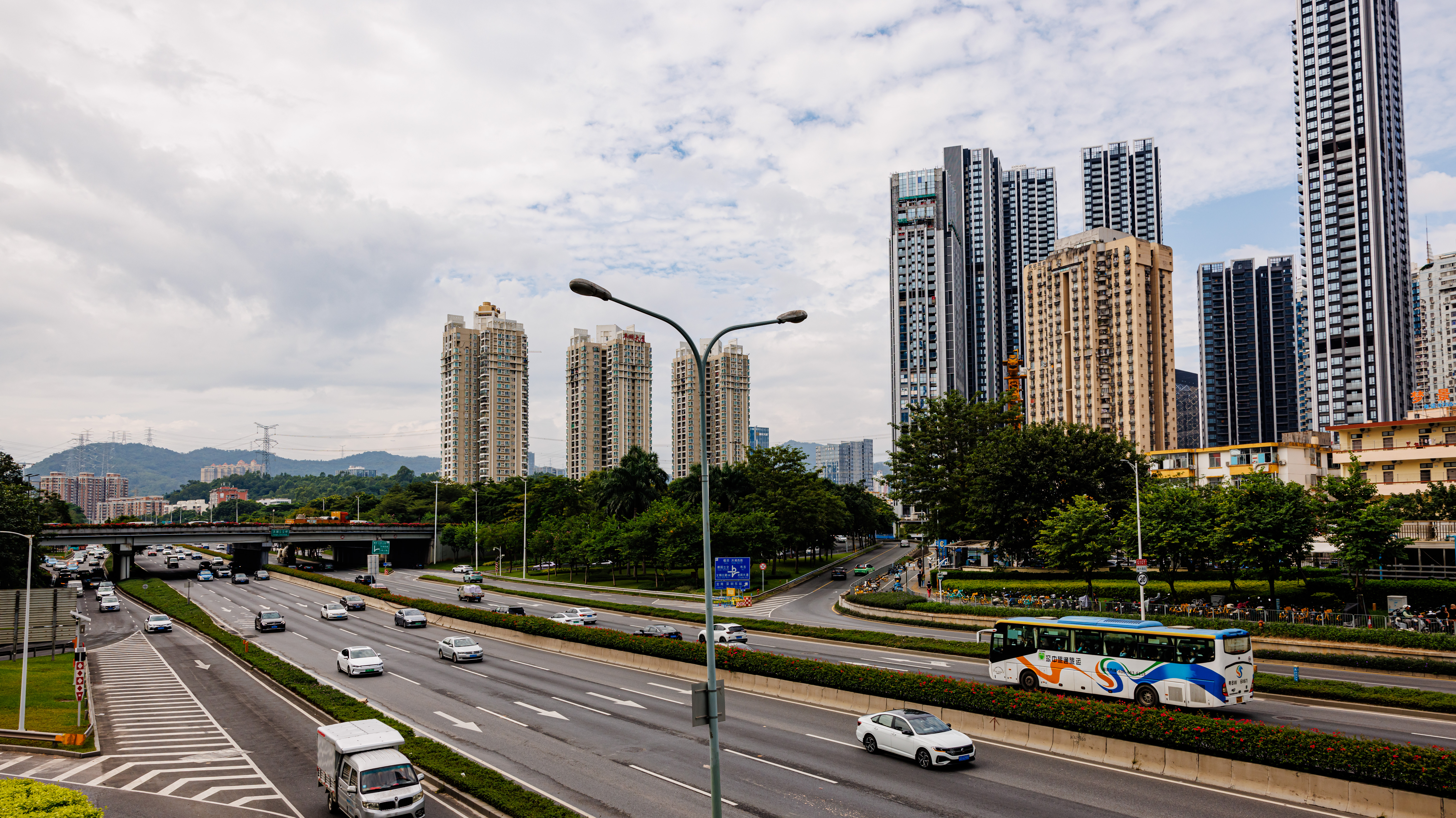
Buxin Road.

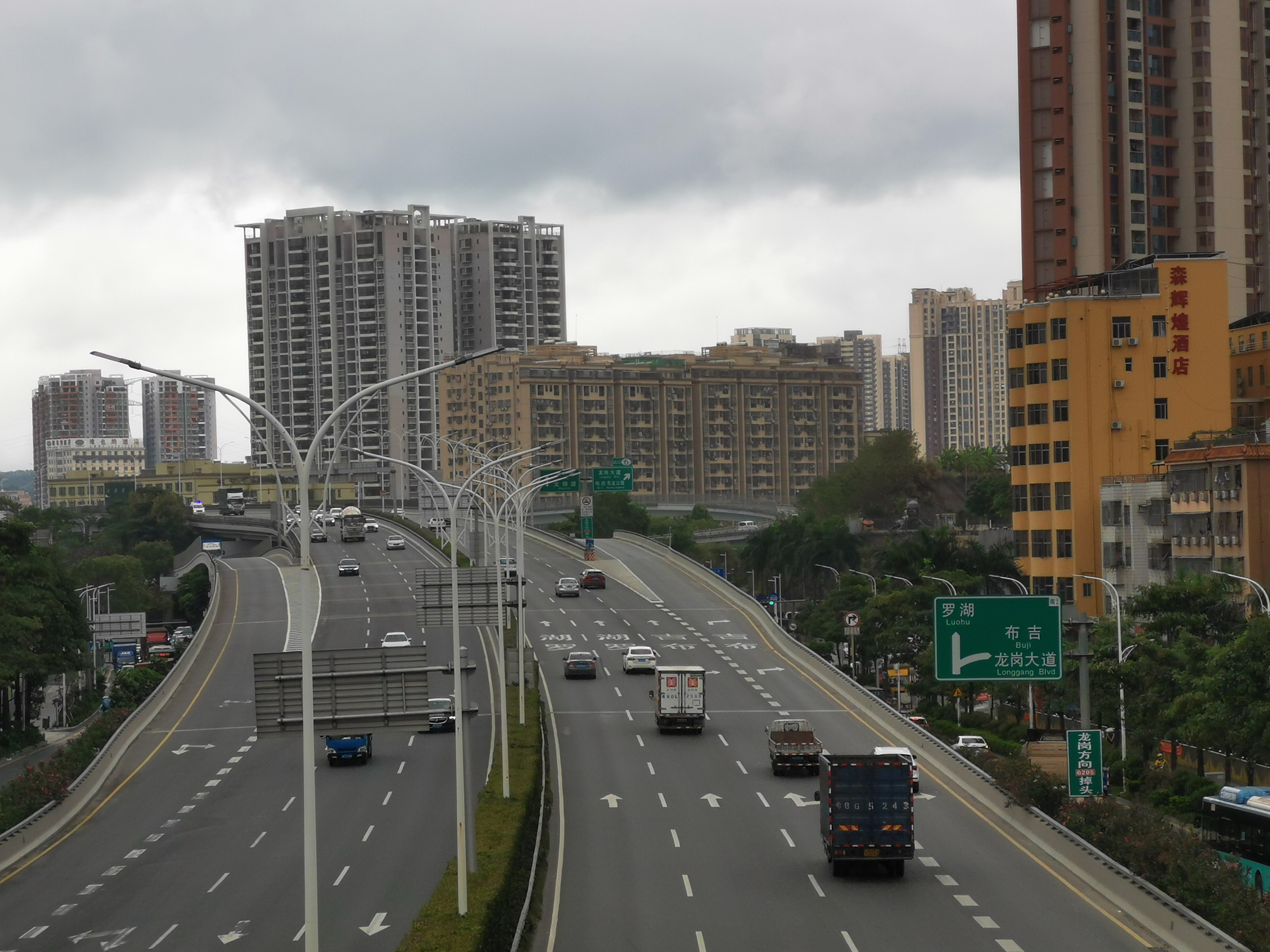
Danping Expressway

Typically, urban roadways in Shenzhen are designated as street, road, avenue and boulevard. Streets in Shenzhen tend to be narrow, with one or two lanes, roads have two to four lanes, while avenues and boulevards are wide, which can have anywhere between four and twelve lanes.

=== Pedestrians ===
There are 3 famous pedestrian streets in Shenzhen.

East Gate Pedestrian Street

Located in Luohu District, East Gate Pedestrian Street, is one of the oldest pedestrian streets in Shenzhen. Commercial activities had begun there even before the city was built. In 1990, the first McDonald's in Mainland China opened there. As the busiest pedestrian street in Shenzhen, it covers a comprehensive range of goods and mainly focuses on clothing. People can now get there by Shenzhen Metro Line 1 or Line 3 at Laojie(meaning Old Street) Station, or Line 3 at Shaibu Station.

Huaqiang North Pedestrian Street

Huaqiang North Pedestrian Street is located in Futian District. It turned pedestrian in late 2016 after the construction of Shenzhen Metro Line 7, later with the underground commercial part completed in July 2018. It was once well known as an ideal marketplace for electronic devices but becoming less popular as online shopping increases. People can now get there by Shenzhen Metro Line 2 or Line 7 at Huaqiang North Station, Line 1 at Huaqiang Road Station, or Line 3 or Line 7 at Huaxin Station.

Chung Ying Street

Chung Ying Street is located within the border town of Sha Tau Kok, North District, Hong Kong, and Shatoujiao, Yantian District, Shenzhen (The same Chinese name of the town with different phonetics in Cantonese and Mandarin), a good place to buy foreign goods if hard to gain access to Hong Kong. Tourists just need to make an appointment in advance and visit within restricted opening hours of a day. A museum about its history is also there for historical sight-seeing.

== Maritime transport ==
=== Ferries ===
There are ferries from Shekou Cruise Centre to other cities in Pearl River Delta region, including Hong Kong, Macau, Zhuhai, etc. There is also a ferry terminal at Shenzhen Bao'an International Airport, with direct ferry connecting Hong Kong International Airport totally in airside. Moreover, there are a few ferries traveling inside Shenzhen like the Yantian-Nan'ao ferry connecting Yantian District with Nan'ao Subdistrict, Dapeng New District.

=== Port ===
The city's 260 km (162 mi) coastline is divided by the main landmass of Hong Kong (namely the New Territories and the Kowloon Peninsula) into two halves, the eastern and the western. Shenzhen's western port area, in Nanshan District, lies to the east of Lingdingyang in the Pearl River Estuary and possesses a deep water harbour with superb natural shelters. It is about 20 nautical miles (37 km; 23 mi) from Hong Kong to the south and 60 nautical miles (111 km; 69 mi) from Guangzhou to the north. By passing Pearl River system, the western port area is connected with the cities and counties in Pearl River Delta networks; by passing On See Dun waterway, it extends all ports both at home and abroad. On the other hand, Shenzhen's eastern port area is located in Yantian District, connected with Pinghu-Yantian Railway at Yantian freight Railway Station.

Shenzhen handled a record number of containers in 2005, ranking as the world's fourth-busiest port, after rising trade increased cargo shipments through the city. China International Marine Containers, and other operators of the port handled 16.2 million standard 20 ft (6.1 m) boxes last year, a 19 percent increase. Investors in Shenzhen are expanding to take advantage of rising volume.

Yantian International Container Terminals, Chiwan Container terminals, Shekou Container Terminals, China Merchants Port and Shenzhen Haixing (Mawan port) are the major port terminals in Shenzhen.

== Air ==
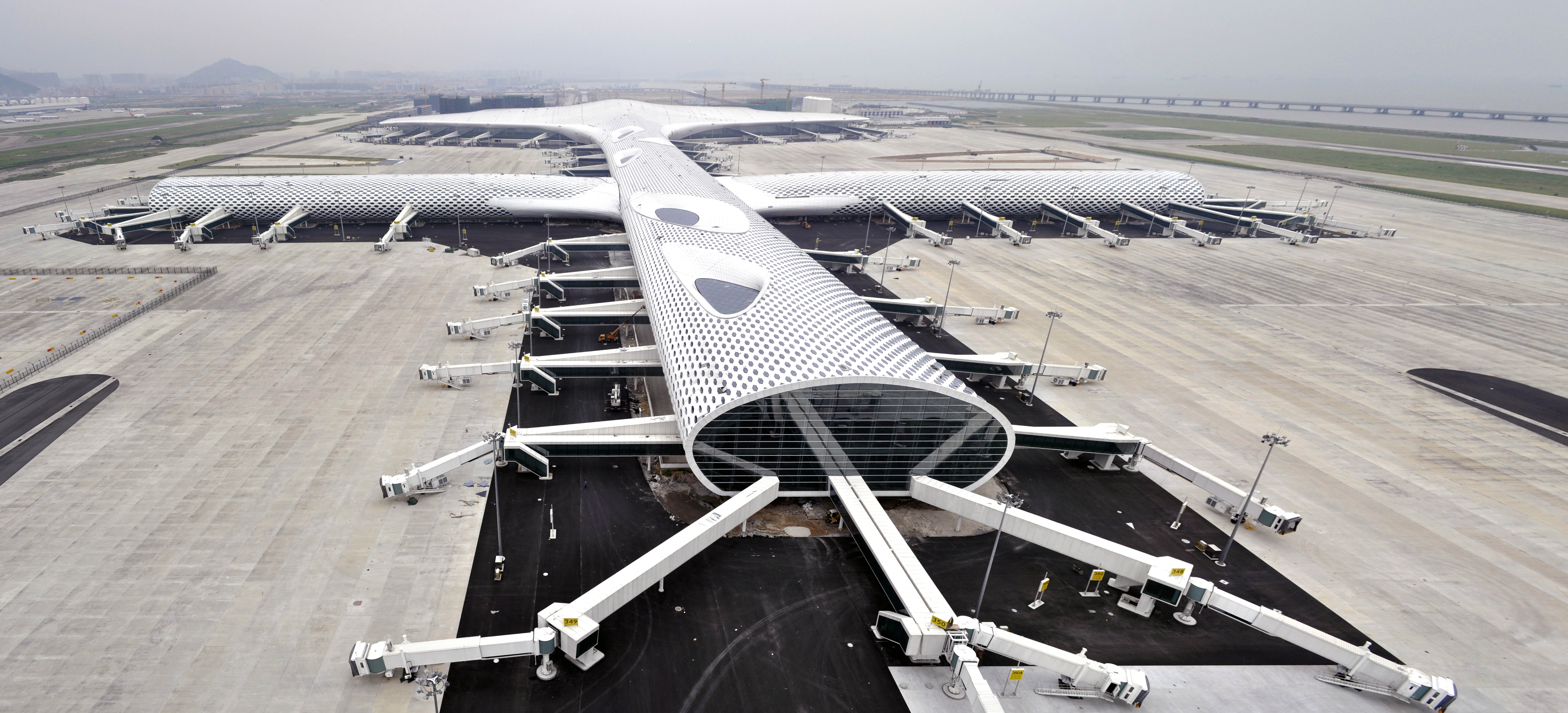
Shenzhen Bao'an International Airport Terminal 3

Donghai Airlines, Shenzhen Airlines and Jade Cargo International are located at Shenzhen Bao'an International Airport. The airport is 32 km (20 mi) from central Shenzhen and connects the city with many other parts of China, as well as international destinations. The airport also serves as an Asian-Pacific cargo hub for UPS Airlines. Shenzhen Donghai Airlines has its head office in the Shenzhen Airlines facility on the airport property. SF Airlines has its headquarters in the International Shipping Center.

Shenzhen is also served by Hong Kong International Airport; ticketed passengers can take ferries from the Shekou Cruise Centre and the Fuyong Ferry Terminal to the HKIA Skypier. There are also coach bus services connecting Shenzhen with Hong Kong International Airport.

There are also heliports in Nanshan District, Futian District and Yantian District for official use or luxurious service.

== See also ==
- Shenzhen Metro
- Shenzhen Bao'an International Airport
- Shenzhen Tram
- List of bus routes in Shenzhen
- Expressways of Guangdong
