= Shenzhen Tong =

Chinese smart card system

Shenzhen Tong 深圳通
- Location: Shenzhen
- Launched: April 2004
- Technology: FeliCa (until December 2007 except Hu Tong Xing) TimeCOSFLY RFID-SIM (mobile Shenzhen Tong)
- Manager: Shenzhen Tong Limited
- Currency: RMB
- Credit expiry: None
- Auto recharge: Automatic Add Value Service
- Validity: Shenzhen Metro; Shenzhen Buses; Taxis; Convenience stores, Supermarkets, Fast-food restaurants; Parking, Vending machines; China T-union (subject to validity, T-union version only)
- Website: www.shenzhentong.com

The Shenzhen Tong (Chinese: 深圳通) is a reusable contactless stored value smartcard used for electronic payments in public transportation and some other areas in Shenzhen city, Guangdong Province, People's Republic of China. It was developed by Shenzhen Modern Computer, the provider of automatic fare collection systems to Shenzhen Metro, with cooperation from Octopus Cards Limited, the operator of Hong Kong's Octopus cards system. It was first adopted by minibuses in Shenzhen, until the new system was introduced by Shenzhen Metro. The English name was originally TransCard.

Starting from January 18, 2006, Shenzhen Tong was gradually accepted by public buses to replace the old IC card system by Shenzhen Bus. All routes operated by Shenzhen Bus Group, Shenzhen Eastern Bus, Shenzhen Western Bus and most other private buses operators accept Shenzhen Tong cards.

Shenzhen Tong card can be purchased for RMB20 (Sale Version Card) deposit. A combined Shenzhen Tong and Hong Kong Octopus card is available, called the Hu Tong Xing, with RMB & HKD in different purses. Infineon Technologies announced it has won a contract to be the sole supplier of contactless microprocessor chips for Shenzhen Tong cards. Issuance unit volume of these cards is expected to exceed three million by the end of 2008. In January 2018, the Shenzhen Tong+ WeChat mini program was launched, allowing users to pay fares with QR codes.

The card itself is a NFC enabled card that can be charged at any MTR station or through a compatible NFC phone.

== Types of cards ==
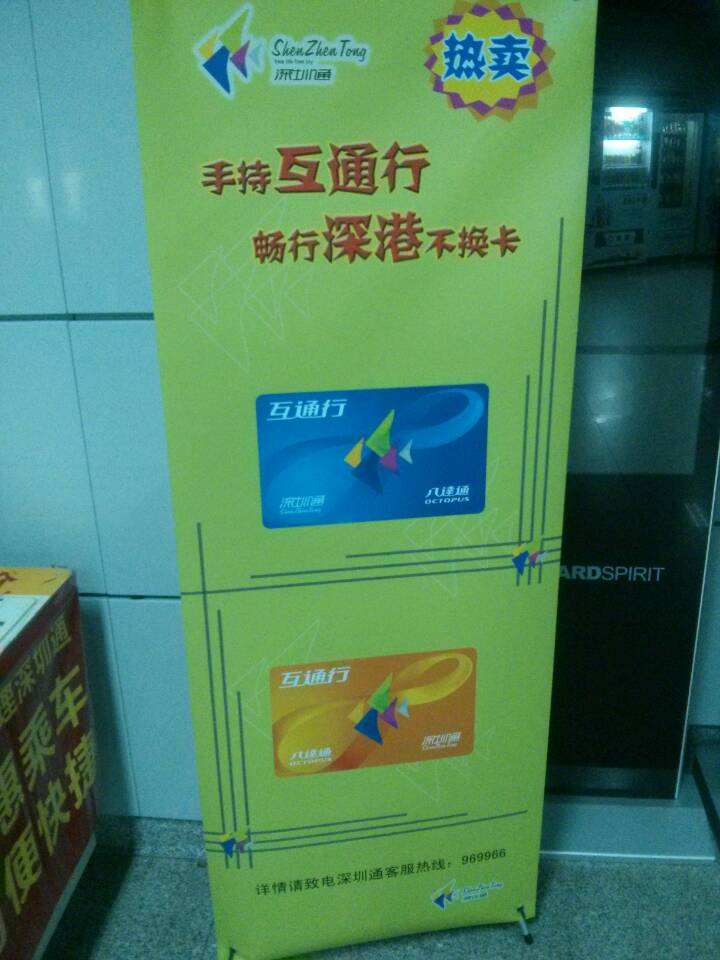
Shenzhen Tong Company is promoting Hu Tong Xing at the unpaid area of Shenzhen University Station, Shenzhen Metro. The top one in the shelf is Hu Tong Xing Trade Edition Card (deep-blue) which is scheduled to sell only in Shenzhen and the bottom one is Hu Tong Xing Trade Edition Card (orange-yellow) which is scheduled to sell only in Hong Kong.

- Rent Version Card
- Sale Version Card
- Special Preferential Card
- Bank Co-Branded Card
- Memorial Card
- Corporation Bardian Card
- Mini Card
- Mobile phone Shenzhen Tong (CMCC, China Telecom, China Unicom)
- Hu Tong Xing (Chinese: 互通行; pinyin: hù tōng xíng, lit. Interoperable Pass Card; Shenzhen Tong - Octopus Card 2 in 1 Co-Branded Card with RMB & HKD in different purses)
- China T-union card

== Cards Gallery ==
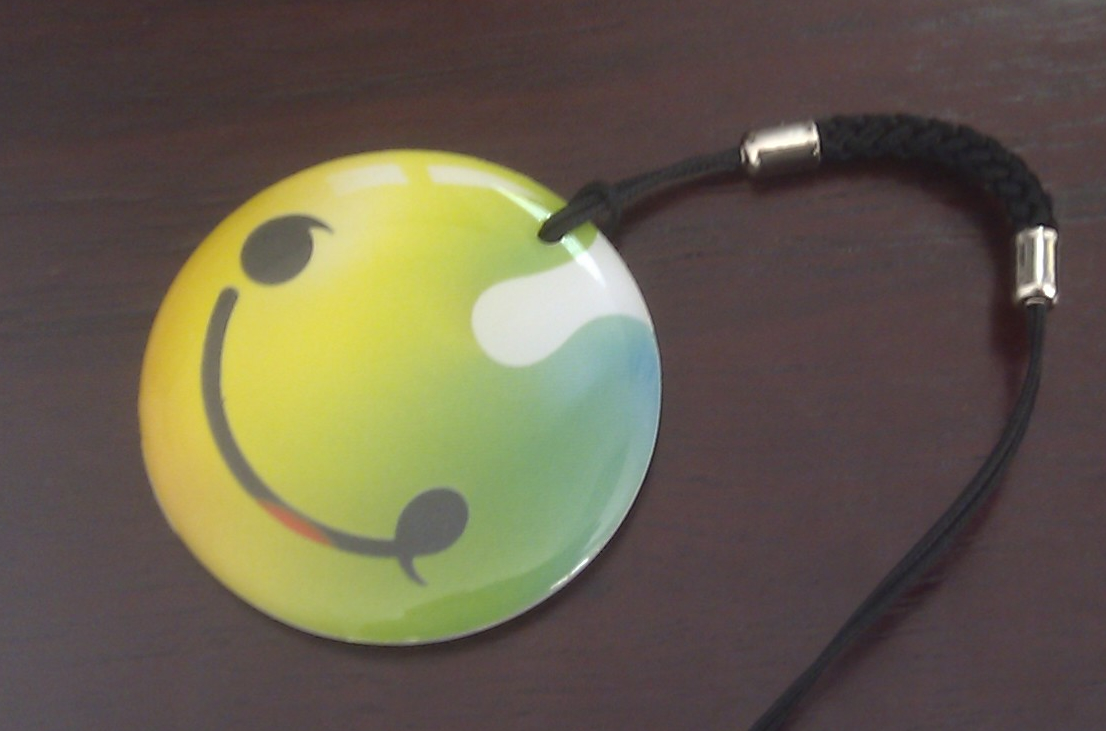
Universiade UU Mini Card

== See also ==
- Electronic money
- List of smart cards
- Octopus card (Hong Kong)
