= Transport International =

Transport International Holdings
- Type: Public
- Traded as: SEHK: 62
- Industry: Bus transport
- Founded: 1933
- Headquarters: Lai Chi Kok, New Kowloon, Hong Kong
- Revenue: ▲HK$8442.725 million (2025)
- Operating income: ▲HK$493.262 million (2025)
- Net income: ▲HK$398.022 million (2025)
- Total assets: ▲HK$23.46 billion (2025)
- Total equity: ▲HK$17.173 billion (2025)
- Number of employees: 12,462 (2025)
- Subsidiaries: Kowloon Motor Bus; Long Win Bus; RoadShow; Shenzhen Bus Group (35%)
- Website: www.tih.hk

Transport International Holdings Limited (Chinese: 載通國際) (SEHK: 62), formerly known as the Kowloon Motor Bus Holdings Limited, is a public transport operator in Hong Kong, and some cities in China, including joint ventures in Beijing and Shenzhen.

In 1961, Kowloon Motor Bus Holdings was listed on the Hong Kong Stock Exchange as parent company of Kowloon Motor Bus. In 2005, the company was renamed Transport International Holdings.

Sun Hung Kai Properties is its largest shareholder with 33% interest.

== Subsidiaries ==
Transport International's business units are:

- The Kowloon Motor Bus Company (1933) Limited
- Long Win Bus Company Limited - founded 1997
- Sun Bus Holdings Limited - founded in 1998 as a non-franchised bus operator providing premium and value-for money tailor-made transportation services (e.g. residential bus service, shuttle bus, tour coach)
- New Hong Kong Bus Company Limited - operator of Lok Ma Chau – Huanggang Cross-boundary shuttle bus service
- Lai Chi Kok Properties Investment Limited
- KMB Financial Services Limited
- RoadShow Holdings Limited - founded 2000 to provide multi-media on-board KMB buses

== Joint ventures ==
- Beijing Beiqi Kowloon Taxi Company Limited
- Shenzhen Bus Group Company Limited - 35% shareholding founded in 2005, it is a provider of bus/mini-bus, limousine, coach, and taxi services in Shenzhen

== See also ==
- Bravo Transport - Parent company of rival operators Citybus and New World First Bus
- Kwoon Chung Bus Holdings Limited - Another transportation holding company in Hong Kong which operate the franchise bus company New Lantao Bus in addition to other non-franchise services.
