= RoadShow =

RoadShow Holdings Limited 路訊通控股有限公司
- Type: Listed company
- Industry: media advertising
- Founded: December 2000
- Headquarters: Hong Kong, incorporated in Bermuda
- Key people: Chairman: Dr. John Chan Cho Chak; Managing Director: Mr. Loh Chan Stephen
- Revenue: HK$407,511,000 (2016 financial year)
- Number of employees: 123 (as at 31 Dec 2016)
- Website: http://www.roadshow.hk/

RoadShow (Chinese: 路訊通) is the first "Multi-Media on-Board" (MMOB) service system on transit vehicles in Hong Kong. It was launched by The Kowloon Motor Bus Holdings Limited (renamed as Transport International Holdings Limited (TIH)) in December 2000. The MMOB business was taken over by RoadShow Holdings Limited in 2001 prior to its listing on the Stock Exchange.

== The Corporation ==
RoadShow Holdings Ltd (路訊通控股有限公司) was listed on the Stock Exchange on 28 June 2001 SEHK: 888) and is currently a member of the TIH Group.

RoadShow Holdings Limited is owned as to approximately 73% by TIH and the remaining 27% goes to public investors. There are four major wholly owned subsidiaries under RoadShow Holdings Limited. They are RoadShow Media Limited, Bus Power Limited, Leader Force Limited and RoadShow Creations Limited. At the same time, the group holds 60% shareholding interest in its subsidiary – Bus Focus Limited.

Subsidiaries of RoadShow were assigned to different business aspects.

=== RoadShow Media Limited ===
RoadShow Media Limited is engaged in the provision of media sales and management services for MMOB business.

=== Bus Power Limited ===
Bus Power Limited is engaged in the provision of media sales services for advertising on transit vehicle exteriors and interiors.

=== Leader Force Limited ===
Leader Force Limited is engaged in the provision of media sales for advertising on billboards.

=== RoadShow Creations Limited ===
RoadShow Creations Limited manages the merchandising business of the corporation. The business includes selling of a variety of commemorative items, bus models and souvenirs.

=== Bus Focus Limited ===
Bus Focus Limited has come into an agreement with KMB Group on the advertising on a number of bus shelters. Bus Focus Ltd enjoys the right to operate the advertising business on bus shelters while KMB Group receives a royalty on a revenue sharing basis, subject to a minimum payment.

== Business ==
RoadShow business consists of three main areas: MMOB, Transit Network and Merchandising business.

=== MMOB ===
The Group's MMOB business includes installing, operating and maintaining equipment and LCD units in transit vehicles for the transmission of tailor-made programmes and advertisements, source programme content and marketing and selling advertising on the MMOB system.

Roadshow provides entertainment and advertisements to the passengers of public transit vehicles in Hong Kong. The programmes are broadcast daily, to an audience of around 3 million, by a series of LCD monitors, each offering a 160° viewing angle, installed in over 4000 transit vehicles from KMB, Long Win Bus (a subsidiary of KMB), Citybus (Hong Kong) and AMS (maxicab).

Each bus has 4 high-resolution LCD screens, which included two 15-inch screens on the lower deck and two 17-inch screens on the upper deck. Audio bus TV broadcasts one-hour pre-recorded VCD programmes 16–18 times a day. The audio of the television broadcasts is delivered via 15 public speakers that line both sides of the passageways on the two decks with four-channel stereo systems.

=== Transit network ===
Another business of RoadShow is advertising on the transit vehicle exterior, interior or transit vehicle shelters. The advertisements make use of the visibility of transit vehicles or vehicle shelters in the street. This outdoor media platform provides over 4,200 buses with exterior panels on double deck buses together with 2,500 bus shelters panels for display of advertising space.

==== Transit Vehicle Exteriors ====
The advertising on the transit vehicle exterior is produced from a high resolution vinyl which can be visible from distance by pedestrians. Transit vehicle exterior advertising includes advertisements on the entire transit vehicle body as well as on panels on the sides and back of the transit vehicle. The vinyl displays are able to withstand the rigors of cleaning and all types of weather, and they can also be removed without harming the paint on the transit vehicle through the use of a special adhesive.

==== Transit Vehicle Shelters ====
While major transit vehicle shelters are traditional shelters, there are increasingly modern transit vehicle shelters constructed of lightweight stainless steel providing comfort to waiting passengers and also an advertising medium to advertisers. Transit vehicle shelter panels mostly have two sides, both of which can display advertisements. The back of the panels is illuminated to highlight the advertisements and to reach both the vehicular and the pedestrian audiences. Advertisements for display in transit vehicle shelters consist of posters supplied by the advertiser.

==== Future Product Developments ====
Bus stop stations called Cyber bus stops are interactive computer terminals locating at certain transit vehicle shelters along major routes as well as inside major transit vehicle terminals. Passengers and pedestrians can access to route information and website via touch-screen display panels.

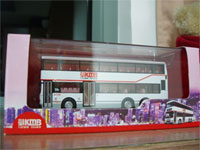
Bus Model of KMB Fleet

=== Merchandising ===
RoadShow merchandising business sells a variety of commemorative items, bus models and souvenirs with the KMB logo. The bus models sold are with special livery and replicate buses operated by Kowloon Motor Bus.

== Business in Mainland China ==
RoadShow began operating on the Mainland in 2002 when it gained the rights to display advertising at the "Lamplight Rainbow" Tunnel on Huahai Road (淮海路) in Shanghai (上海). Subsequently, its assets grew to include bus bodies, bus shelters and telephone booths in Beijing (北京), Guangzhou (廣州) and Shenzhen (深圳). It also began offering advertising agency services for the Guangzhou Metro mass transit system and outdoor media assets in other regions such as Tianjin(天津), Chengdu(成都) and Xi'an(西安).

RoadShow has reduced its investments in mainland China since 2010 and focused on its advertising business in Hong Kong.

== Programming ==
Recently all of the RoadShow's programmes are prepared in a video compact disc (VCD). There are 3 different versions of VCD available in the 4,000 buses. There is a certain pattern in distributing different versions of disc, which version A and B will be available in 1,200 buses respectively and version C for 1,600 buses. All discs are distributed on a daily, random and rotational basis over the fleet.

Apart from TV advertisements, a number of programme segments have been introduced to RoadShow's programme development. These segments are not only produced by the production team of RoadShow, but also from independent production bodies and other local (e.g. ATV and RTHK) and non-local media agencies (e.g. Phoenix TV and BBC and also Taiwan TV programmes).

In September 2001, RoadShow and ATV have agreed to become strategic partners and struck a 3-year deal that entitles RoadShow the exclusive right to show ATV programme highlights. TV drama highlights, weekly news summary, game show as well as infotainment programmes have been aired on RoadShow. In addition, RTHK is now providing programme content freely to RoadShow as well.

RoadShow also co-operates with other organisations and companies to produce programmes. For example, the programme Weekends Game Review, which introduced new PC games, was a co-product by RoadShow and Cross Media, a Hong Kong publication company. Besides, RoadShow also sponsors some outdoor activities, like concerts, and broadcasts the behind-the-scenes footage.

The content of segments can be categorised in the following classification.

Type [Example(s)]

- Cartoon [Charming Pink Panther]
- Celebrity Chat [RoadShow House of Stars]
- Family and Health [Strategy to Health]
- iClub Interactive Game [iClub Mobile Phone Ringtone Downloading, iClub Jetso Delivery]
- Infotainment [Youth Voice by Breakthrough, Trend Fascination, Police Information Station]
- Lifestyle [Delicacies in Hong Kong]
- Music and Movie [Music on Road and Power Pick]
- News and Current Affairs [Weekly News Summary]
- Science [Mobile Digital Station]
- Society, Education and Community [When We Were Young by RTHK, The Disney Oral Classroom, Oxfam: the Road to Poverty Alleviation in China, Haven of Hope Christian Service]
- Special [Your LegCo, Meeting Room of Scarlett Pong, Halloween Party for Singles]
- Sports and Recreation [J.League Soccer News]
- Travelogue [3 Minutes to the World]

Most of the RoadShow's programmes are in Cantonese with Chinese language subtitles. But increasingly there are more English and Putonghua programmes available for passengers.

=== Future development on programming ===
KMB is now undertaking an experimental project to introduce the Global Positioning System (GPS) on bus tracking and bus fleet management. Apart from the traffic management purpose, the usage of GPS on the fleet can also provide real time information to RoadShow, which means that real time news, weather and traffic information will be available in RoadShow in the future.

However, in dense urban areas with congested high-rise buildings, the satellite signals to the GPS receiver are often blocked and the accuracy of the results adversely affected. KMB claims that GPS would only be installed to the whole fleet until the problem is solved.

== Advertisement ==
MMOB serves as a mobile podium for advertising in Hong Kong. Its special feature is to provide a large number of passengers with frequent broadcasting on advertisements, those mobile advertisements can arouse consumers' impromptu intention on shopping. It is a popular channel for companies to promote their products for different reasons:

- When people watch television at home they are often engaged in other activities. They are sometimes eating, looking after their children, knitting, cooking etc. In this way watching television becomes a secondary activity. But at the bus the consumers don't have a lot of other activities to engage in. Here, watching television becomes a primary activity.
- By choosing bus-routes for their commercials, advertisers can easily identify consumers travelling to shopping centres and entertainment venues on transit vehicles. They are on their way to spend money and will easily recall the information given by the advertisers while they are shopping.

In addition to MMOB services, RoadShow also served as the agency in managing a number of outdoor advertisements on exterior and interior of buses and in bus shelter panels in Hong Kong.

Advertising on RoadShow MMOB

Standard rate for Ad in RoadShow (wef. 1 Apr 2005)

Claimed as a mobile advertising media with large audience base, RoadShow provides different plans for their clients to place commercials. Price varies from the length of the commercial as well as the number of buses involved.

== Movement against RoadShow ==
=== A Captive Audience ===
The main argument against MMOB argues the fact that the travellers cannot turn off the programs, turn down the volume or change channel. This implies that they cannot skip the commercials. Public transport franchises enjoy "monopoly" over many routes. Many passengers have no real alternative means of transport. The term "captive audience" is repeated. Human brain cannot ignore sound or vision. RoadShow's website described bus television as "a highly effective multi-media advertising platform that pushes your products and services to reach a mass audience in a captive environment".

On the other side, there are passengers who welcome MMOB. Especially short-distance travellers, welcome the free infotainment. By short-distance travellers, it means travellers who travel for less than 10 minutes. Others supporting bus television believe that the income from commercials will ultimately help to reduce pressure on fare increase and ensure more efficient public bus services.

=== Anti-bus TV Noise Groups ===
The introduction of this "Multi-media on Board" on franchised public transport is controversial. Members of the public and newspaper columnists have complained in the media about the problems of noise pollution, ubiquitous commercialism, exploitation of passengers' captive situation, abuse of public transport franchises, and the lack of options for passengers who prefer not to watch or listen to television broadcasts.

The installation of commercial TV services in buses was met with opposition from its beginning. The opposition came from passengers who found the noise from commercial broadcasting on buses disturbing. A concern group called Hush the Bus (HTB, 靜巴運動) was formed on 4 May 2002. It aims to reduce passenger annoyance from bus TV. Prior to the establishment of HTB, what later became members of it lobbied against multi-media advertising on public transport under the ban of the Citizens Party. Members have met with government officials, legislators and executives of the bus companies. HTB has managed to continue to interact with its supporters and is persistent in its lobbying work. But in the main it has remained a minority. It has been argued that its activities highlight the weak power of environmental or civic groups contra profit-making corporations.

Also there is NO Bus on TV Project, which is supported by Hong Kong Consumer Advocates, established to protect kids from being captured by the broadcast of TV on public bus. They conduct surveys on buses and report the data on websites and they expose the flaw of why the bus companies so eager to run bus TV. They advocate safe and fair public transportation facilities in Hong Kong.

They claim that Bus TV violate riders' rights to freedom of choice. And while some advertisements, content of the programmes might have:

- violence
- debasing music
- movies not suitable for children
- adult movies
- boring talk show
- superstitious talk show
- aggressively pushing products and services
- manipulative ads which can bring great harms to people especially children.

They claim that Roadshow has interrupted their freedom as there are:

- no on-off switch
- no remote control
- no option not to be bothered

== Directors and Executive Members ==
- Chairman and non-executive director: Mr John Chan Cho Chak (陳祖澤)
- Managing Director: Mr. Loh Chan Stephen (羅燦)
- Chief Financial Officer: Mr Lawrence Chan Kwan (陳鈞)
- Chief Operating Officer: Mr Thomas Lo Sui Sing (盧瑞盛)

== Other MMOBs in Hong Kong ==
- FirsTVision(新資訊) Now is under controlled by RoadShow.
- Newsline Express (新聞直線)

In March 2005, the Kowloon-Canton Railway Corporation (KCR) and i-CABLE Communications Limited (i-Cable) announced the launching of "Newsline Express" on board the KCR trains. News information and advertisement will be delivered to passengers through the existing Passenger Information Display System (PIDS) on trains.

In MTR, there are LCD giving advertisements to customers.

In time, MMOBs might become widespread in HK.

== See also ==
- Media in Hong Kong
- Transportation in Hong Kong
- MediaCorp TV TVMobile was a "similar" system in use mainly on buses in Singapore but has since ceased operation from 1 January 2010.
- Road Show Events is a "similar" system use mainly on buses and trailers in Spain
