= William S.D. Louey Educational Foundation =

Chinese-based foundation

- Established: 1995
- Founder: William Louey
- Type: Private foundation
- Purpose: Education, scholarships
- Website: https://williamlouey.foundation/

The William S.D. Louey Educational Foundation is a philanthropic organization dedicated to providing educational opportunities for talented but underprivileged students, primarily from China and Hong Kong. The William S.D. Louey Educational Foundation is named in honor of William Sui-tak Louey.

== Founder ==
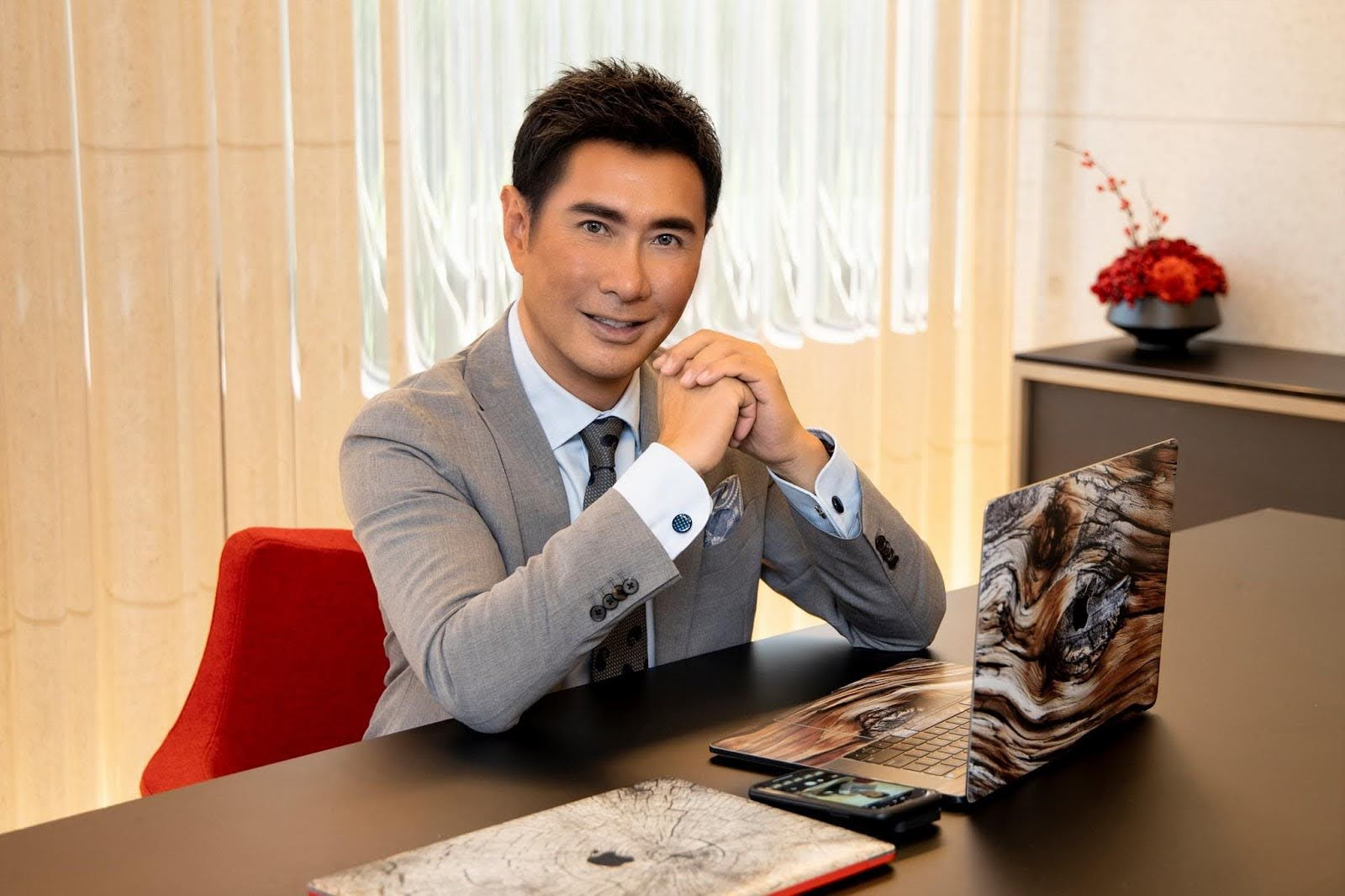
William Louey, founder of the William S.D. Louey Educational Foundation

William Louey, the founder of the William S.D. Louey Educational Foundation, is a businessman and Director of the Kowloon Motor Bus Company (KMB). He established the foundation in 1995 to honor his grandfather, William Sui-tak Louey, and to provide educational opportunities for talented but underprivileged students.

In 1999, William Louey joined the China Oxford Scholarship Fund committee. In recognition of his and the foundation's contributions, he was appointed to the University of Oxford's Vice-Chancellor's Circle in 2011. In 2013, the University of Oxford awarded William Louey the Elizabeth Wordsworth Fellowship in recognition of his contribution to UK higher education.

William Louey promotes education to support personal growth and community development. He believes in the value of knowledge and the importance of helping to develop future leaders.

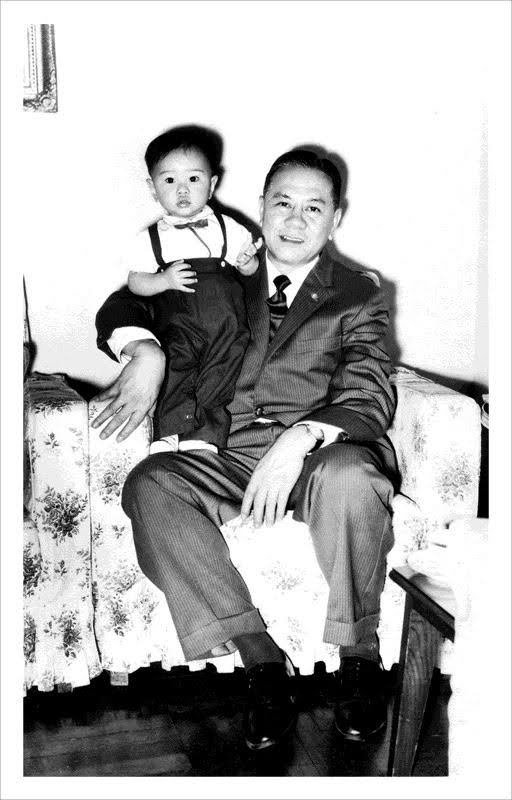
A young William Louey with his grandfather, William S.D. Louey, whose legacy is honoured through the William S.D. Louey Foundation, established in 1995

== Activity ==
The William S.D. Louey Educational Foundation provides scholarships and support to talented students from mainland China who may not otherwise have access to top-tier education. The foundation emphasizes a "pay-it-forward" philosophy, encouraging its scholars to give back to their communities and support future generations of students.

The Foundation provides financial assistance to students from China, enabling them to study in reputed international institutions such as the University of Oxford and the University of Cambridge in the UK, and MIT and Harvard University in the US. The foundation's support extends beyond financial assistance and provides mentorship and guidance throughout the scholars' academic and professional development, ensuring success. Its founder William Louey continues to maintain close relationships with past scholars.

The scholarship is recognized for promoting long-term community engagement and fostering educational opportunities for students from China and Hong Kong.

Since its founding, the foundation has provided over $60 million in scholarships to more than 60 students, enabling them to study in the United States, the United Kingdom, and other countries. The foundation has recently expanded its reach to support students from other regions.

=== Pay-It-Forward Philosophy ===
The foundation is built on a pay-it-forward philosophy, encouraging scholars to give back to their communities and help future students. The recipients embraced this principle by mentoring others, supporting scholarships, or contributing to similar programs.

In 2015, a group of former scholars launched the Pay It Forward Scholarship under the China Oxford Scholarship Fund (COSF), which has supported 12 students at the University of Oxford. The foundation continues to support this approach by offering mentorship and guidance, fostering a culture of giving back and ensuring the long-term impact of its work on education and community development.

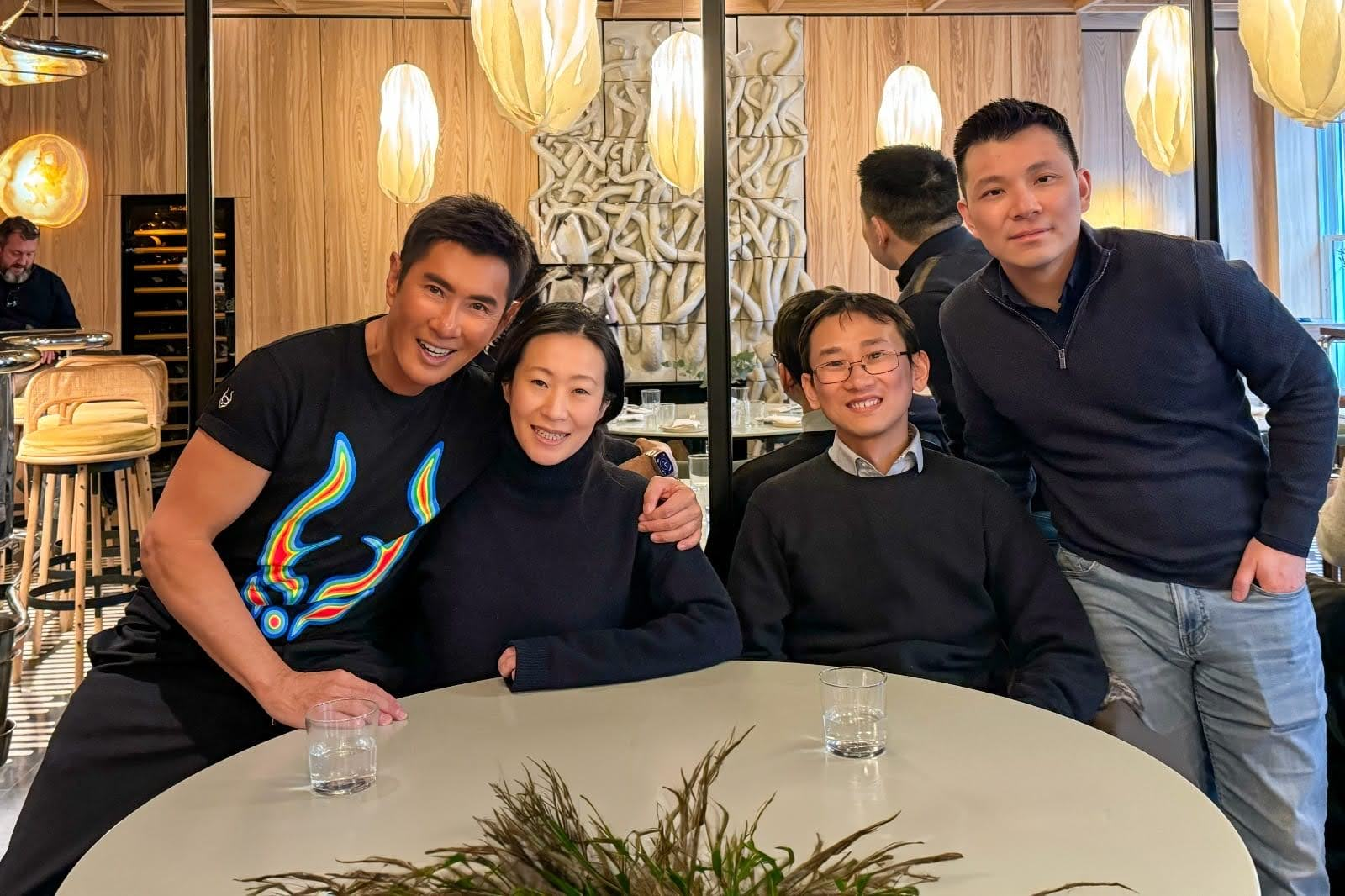
Scholars of the William S.D. Louey Educational Foundation Marty Sun, Baoqiang Xiao, and Yangyang Hou with founder William Louey

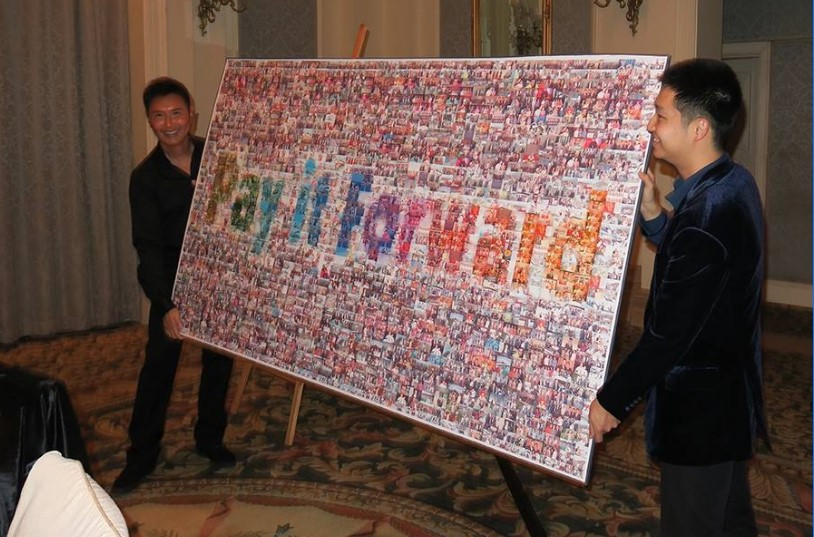
William S.D. Louey Foundation Scholar Dun Xiao (Shield) during the launch of the Pay It Forward movement inspired by William Louey's philanthropic mission

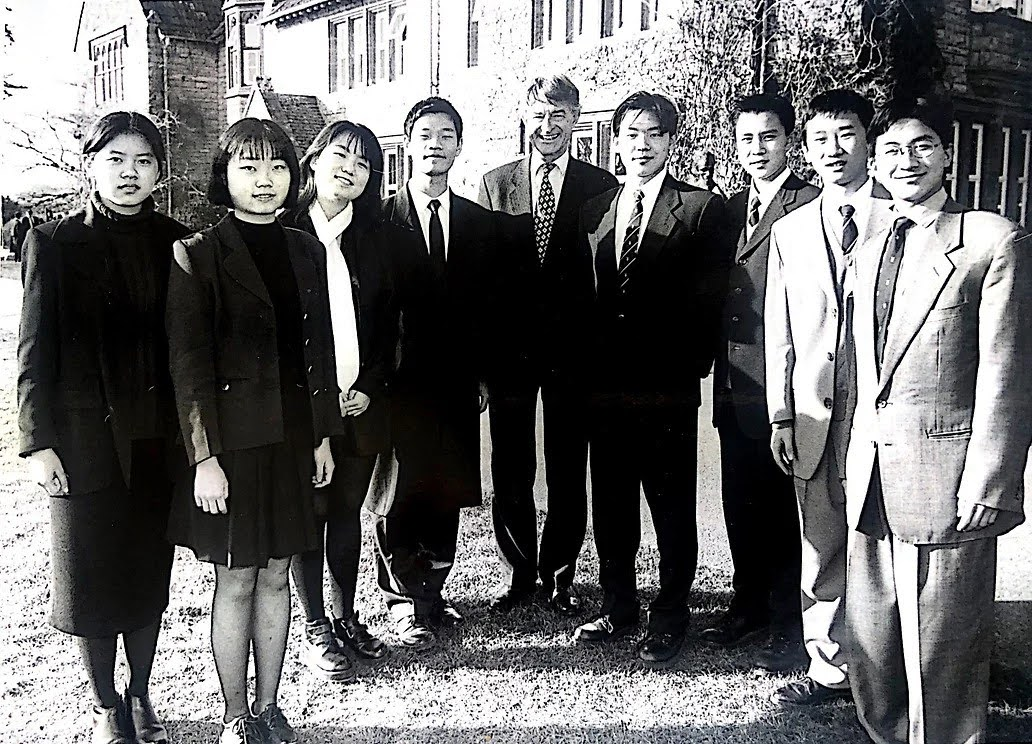
William S.D. Louey Educational Foundation scholars in 1998 with the headmaster of Millfield School before graduating to The University of Oxford and The University of Cambridge
