= Long Win Bus =

Bus operator in Hong Kong

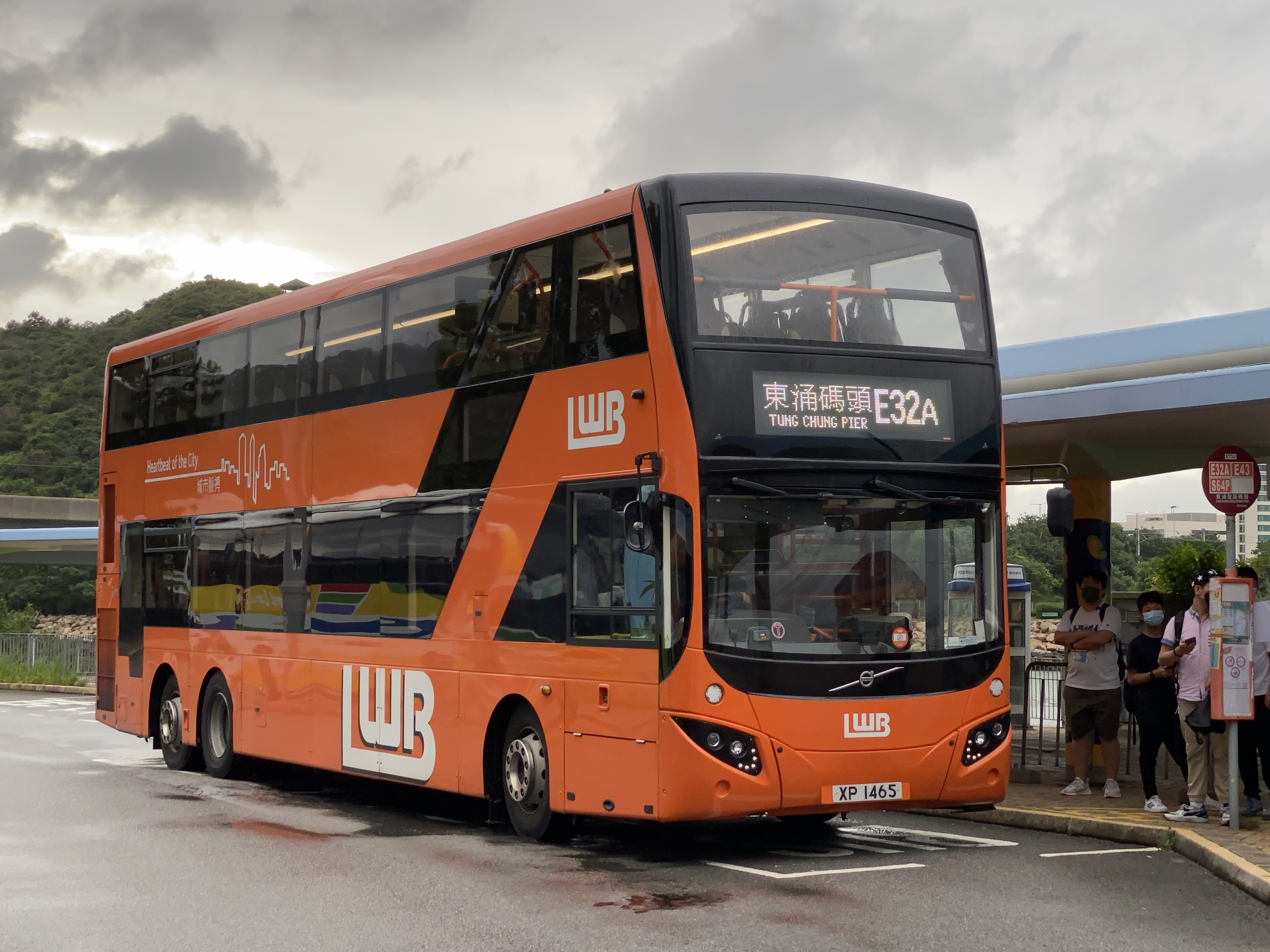
- MCV EvoSeti bodied Volvo B8L in August 2022
- Parent: Transport International
- Founded: March 21, 1997; 29 years ago
- Headquarters: 9 Po Lun Street, Lai Chi Kok, Kowloon
- Locale: Hong Kong International Airport; North Lantau New Town; New Territories
- Service type: Bus services
- Alliance: Kowloon Motor Bus
- Routes: 42 (2023)
- Depots: Siu Ho Wan (T)
- Fleet: 313 (2026)
- Daily ridership: 118,000 (2023)
- Annual ridership: 42,938,000 (2023)
- Fuel type: Diesel; Battery electric
- Website: www.kmb.hk

Long Win Bus
- Traditional Chinese: 龍運巴士
- Simplified Chinese: 龙运巴士
Transcriptions
Standard Mandarin
- Hanyu Pinyin: Lóng Yùn Bāshì
Yue: Cantonese
- Jyutping: lung4 wan6 baa1 si6*2

Long Win Bus Company Limited (LWB; Chinese: 龍運巴士) is a bus company operating franchised services in Hong Kong. It provides bus service between Hong Kong International Airport, North Lantau New Town and the New Territories. It is a subsidiary of Transport International.

== History ==
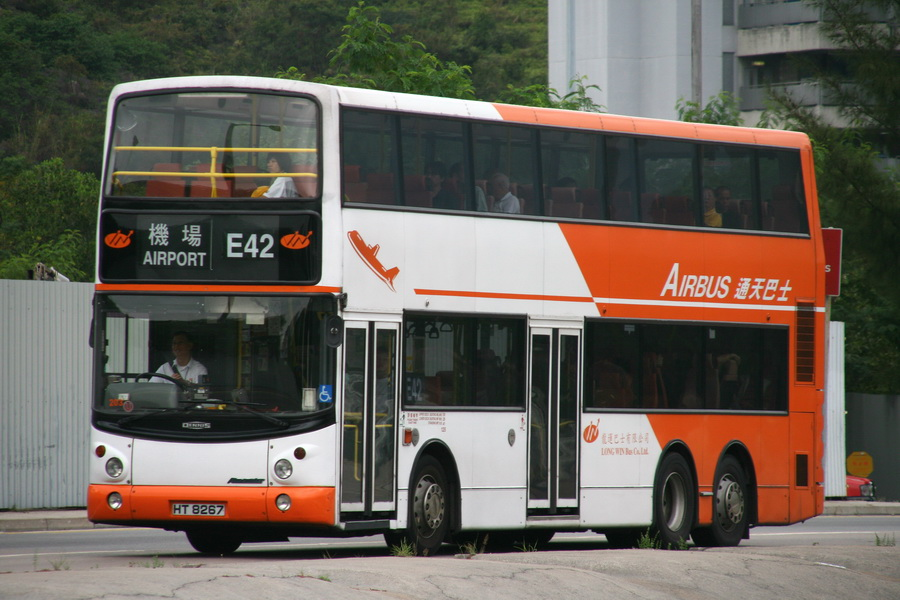
ALX500 bodied Dennis Trident 3 in November 2009

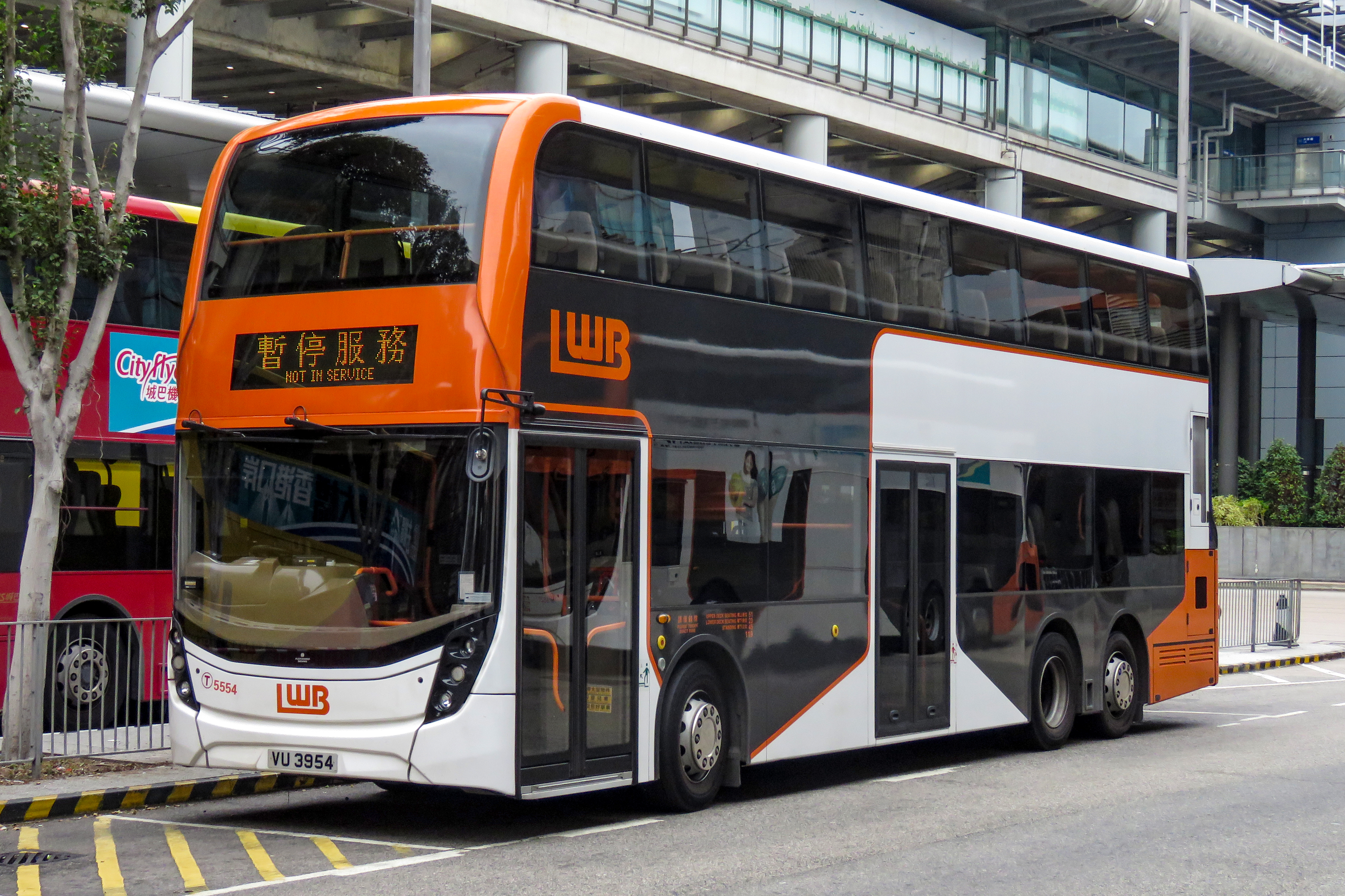
Enviro500 MMC in February 2019

Long Win Bus began operations on 22 May 1997, operating peak-hour services after the opening of the Tsing Ma Bridge.

The first route operated by Long Win Bus was route E31 (Tung Chung to Tsuen Wan Pier when newly introduced), served by Volvo Olympians. But later on, Volvo Olympians have been retired from the bus fleet, and were transferred to its parent company, Kowloon Motor Bus.

The company's franchise was extended from June 2003 to May 2013. In April 2012, it was extended again until May 2023. In July 2022, it was further extended for another 10 years until 30 April 2033.

As of 2026,Long Win has only one depot Located in Siu Ho Wan,which sits near the North Lantau Highway next to Citybus's depot. The company also borrows depot space from KMB if the depot does not have enough parking space.

== Services ==
As of December 2023, Long Win Bus operated 42 routes which cover the airport, Tung Chung, Hong Kong Disneyland and AsiaWorld–Expo. The current letter assignments are in place to identify the type of bus service provided:

=== Numbering system ===
- A30-A39, E30-E39: Routes serving the Western New Territories, including Kwai Tsing District, Tsuen Wan District, Tuen Mun District and Yuen Long District
- A40-A49, E40-E49: Routes serving the Eastern New Territories, including Sha Tin District, Tai Po District and the North District, does not serve Sai Kung District due to the franchise currently being with Citybus

=== Prefixes ===
  - A: Airport routes. Provides deluxe bus services to and from Hong Kong International Airport and Hong Kong–Zhuhai–Macau Bridge Hong Kong Port.
  - E: External routes. Provides regular bus services serving the Airport Logistics Area and Tung Chung.
  - R: Routes serving Hong Kong Disneyland.
  - S: Shuttle routes. Provides regular bus services running between Tung Chung and the general airport area.
  - N: Overnight routes. Same class as E-prefix routes
  - NA: Overnight airport routes: Same class as A-prefix routes
  - X: Routes operated after big events at AsiaWorld–Expo.

=== Suffixes ===
  - A: Branch of the main route (e.g., E36A)
  - C: Routes serving the Airport Logistics Area only, with all routes terminating at the Aircraft Maintenance Area. Same class as E-prefix routes.
  - P/S: Peak hour routes, although route E33P provides services beyond peak hours. (Except A41P)

== Fleet ==
As of October 2026, Long Win Bus operated a fleet of 313 buses including 313 air-conditioned low floor double-decker buses and 4 air-conditioned single-decker battery electric buses, which have been given back to Kowloon Motor Bus under a new fleet number (BDE). In addition,Long Win has purchased a total of 77 Volvo B8Ls, 65 were MCV bodied and the other 10 were Wright Gemini bodied, only 2 B8Ls (AV6X) had KMB's iconic "Heartbeat of the City" livery which had Vogelsitze Magnio seats instead of the UV6Xs which had Vogel Revo S440mm seats and the other AV6X which mainly ran on KMB's P960 and P968 was given to Long Win from KMB including the 12 meter variant. The majority of Long Win's fleet are mainly Enviro500 MMCs, UE6X (Enviro500MMC 12.8M) mainly runs on Long Win's E routes and sometimes on airport routes, its livery is orange and has Vogel Revo S440mm seats with luggage racks. However,eight of the ninety UE6Xs have KMB's retro livery with two wheelchair spaces and no luggage racks. The 84xx (Enviro500) is currently Long Win's oldest bus with only five buses, it has Lazzerini Citylight seats and luggage racks, they typically run on routes that operate in the Tung Chung area, occasionally it runs on E routes in Tsuen Wan, the chance of this bus running on airport routes is insanely low due to its poor seats and condition and will be retired in the future. The 25xx (Enviro500MMC 12.8M ) is similar to the UE6X but with luggage racks and only one wheelchair space,the livery is a mix of orange, white and black and with Vogelsitze Magnio seats instead of the Vogel Revo S440mm seats and mainly runs on E routes and sometimes on airport routes. The 55xx (Enviro500MMC 12.8M) is one of Long Win's most known buses mainly because of its stunning livery, it has luggage racks and Vogelsitze Magnio seats and the same thing can be said for its longer variant,(15xx). One of these buses had curtains installed and it was also from KMB which used to run on P968 and P960 (WA 4616). The AE6X (Enviro500MMC 12.8M Coach) is one of Long Win's newest buses and some people call it "Fake N32" because KMB has the exact same bus but with luggage racks and better seats, mainly running on A routes and never once ran on E routes.

== Retired fleet ==
In 2024,Long Win retired all eight of its Enviro500 (801–808) which were MK1 bodied (801–803) and MK2 bodied (804–808), it had yellow-colored hanover as its routeboard and had Lazzerini Citylight seats with luggage racks included.

In 2020,Long Win transferred all eighteen of its Volvo B9TLs to KMB which were Alexander bodied, it was also Long Win's only B9TL and had Gorba display and has the same facilities as the LWB Enviro500 but some had Vogelsitze seats. As of 2026, KMB has retired all of these buses in 2025 and was Hong Kong's last franchised Euro III bus still in service.
