= Shenzhen Bus Group =

Chinese bus operating company

Shenzhen Bus Group Co., Ltd

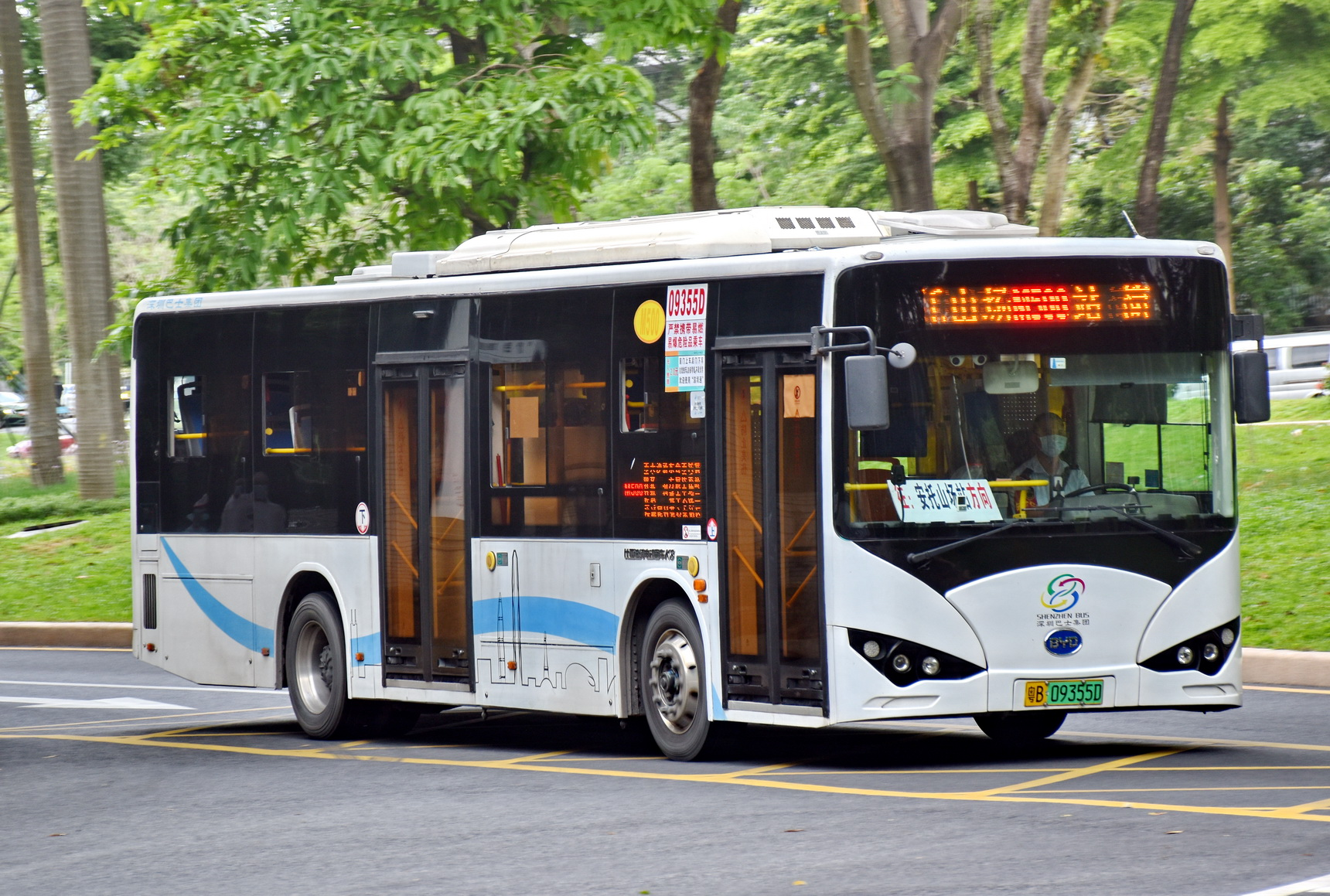
- Shenzhen Bus Group BYD K8 in May 2020
- Parent: SASAC (55%); Transport International (35%)
- Commenced operation: 1975; 50 years ago
- Service area: Shenzhen
- Service type: Bus services
- Routes: 352
- Fleet: 5698 (2017)
- Fuel type: Electric
- Website: www.szbus.com.cn

Shenzhen Bus Group Co., Ltd (SBG) (Chinese: 深圳巴士集团股份有限公司; pinyin: Shēnzhèn Bāshì Jítuán Gǔfèn Yǒuxiàn Gōngsī) is a Chinese state-owned company that offers bus passenger transportation services in Shenzhen. In 2017, it made international news as the world's first fully electric bus fleet.

== History ==
SBG was founded in 1975 and was wholly controlled by State-owned Assets Supervision and Administration Commission of Shenzhen.

In 2005, Kowloon Motor Bus invested around 390 million CNY (US$47 million) to subscribe a 35% stake of the company, which was then re-registered as Shenzhen Bus Group Co., Ltd.

== Operation ==
In 2017, SBG retired all of its diesel buses and started operating a fleet of 5698 pure electric buses on 352 routes in Shenzhen, making it the world's first fully electric bus fleet. It completed around 800 million passenger journeys among the total number of 1.6 billion in Shenzhen in 2018.

== See also ==
- Transport in Shenzhen
- List of bus routes in Shenzhen
