= Dongcheng Subdistrict, Dongguan =

Dongcheng 东城街道
- Subdistrict
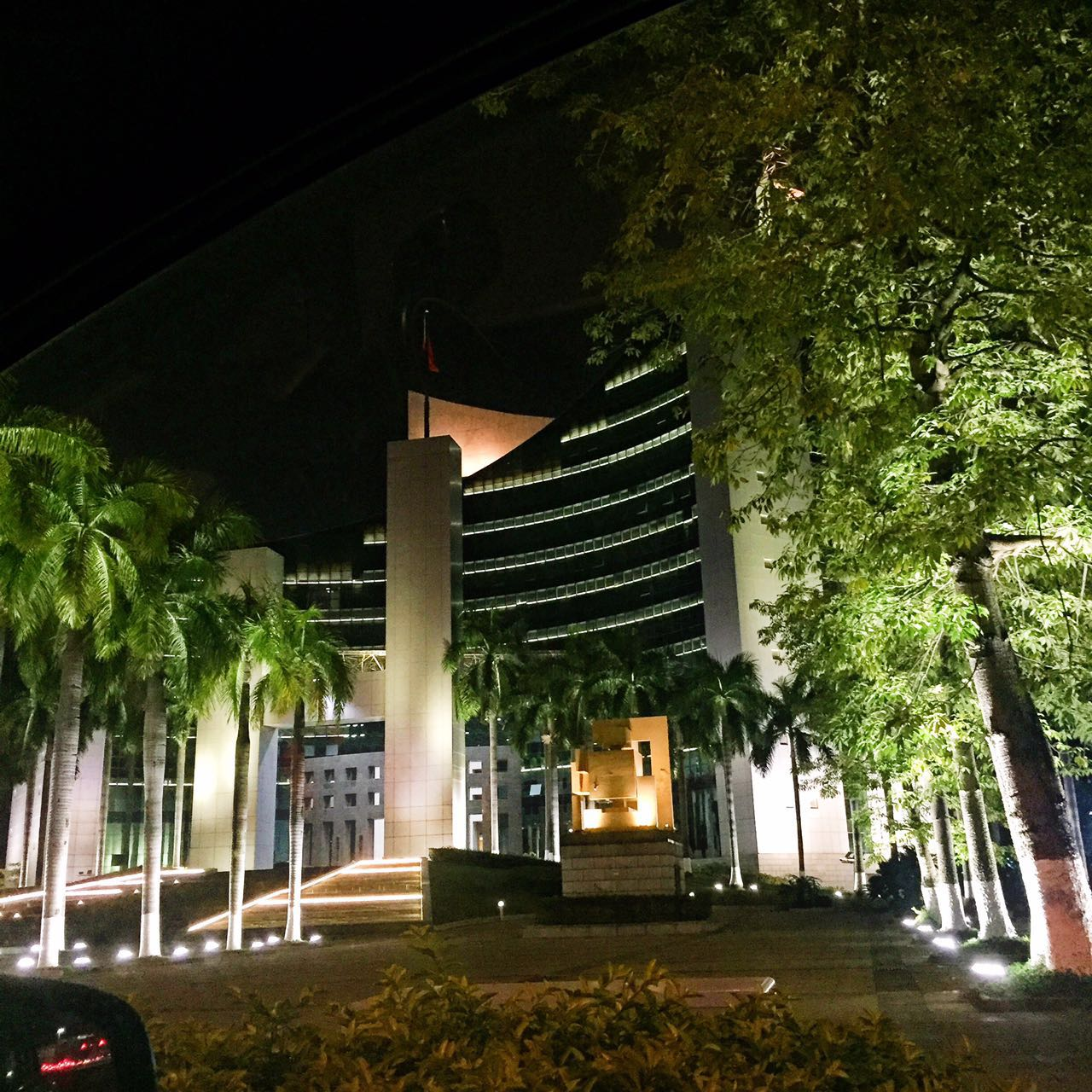
- The government building in Dongcheng Subdistrict

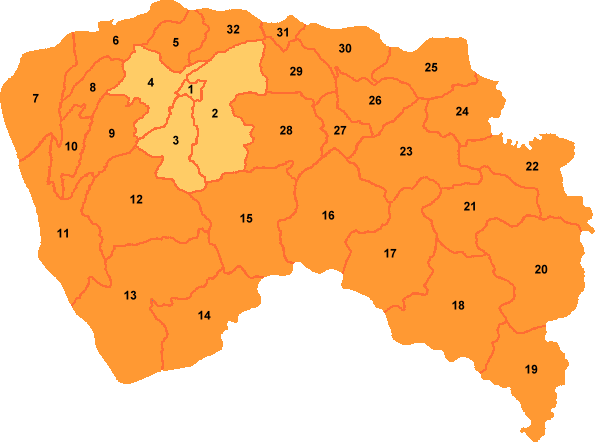
- Dongcheng Subdistrict is labeled "2" on this map of Dongguan

- Location of Dongcheng Subdistrict within Guangdong
- Country: People's Republic of China
- Province: Guangdong
- Prefecture-level city: Dongguan

Area
  - Total: 105.9 km^{2} (40.9 sq mi)

Population (2019)
  - Total: 500,000
  - Density: 4,700/km^{2} (12,000/sq mi)
  - Hukou Population: 99,500

GDP
  - Total: ¥ 58.656 billion (2019)
- Time zone: UTC+8 (China Standard)
- Postal code: 523129
- Website: dongcheng.dg.gov.cn

Dongcheng Subdistrict (simplified Chinese: 东城街道; traditional Chinese: 東城街道; pinyin: Dongchéng Jiēdào) is one of the four subdistricts of Dongguan, Guangdong Province, China.

The subdistrict has an area of 105.9 square kilometers, and, as of 2019, has a permanent population of around 500,000, and a registered population of around 99,500. Dongcheng Subdistrict's GDP as of 2019 is ¥58.656 billion.

== History ==
In 1958, Fucheng Commune (附城公社) was established. The commune existed until 1983, when it was changed to a district. The district was revoked in 1988 for Fucheng Subdistrict. In March 2000, Dongguan renamed Fucheng Subdistrict to Dongcheng Subdistrict.

== Administrative divisions ==
Dongcheng is divided into 23 residential communities and 2 living districts (生活区).

== Economy ==
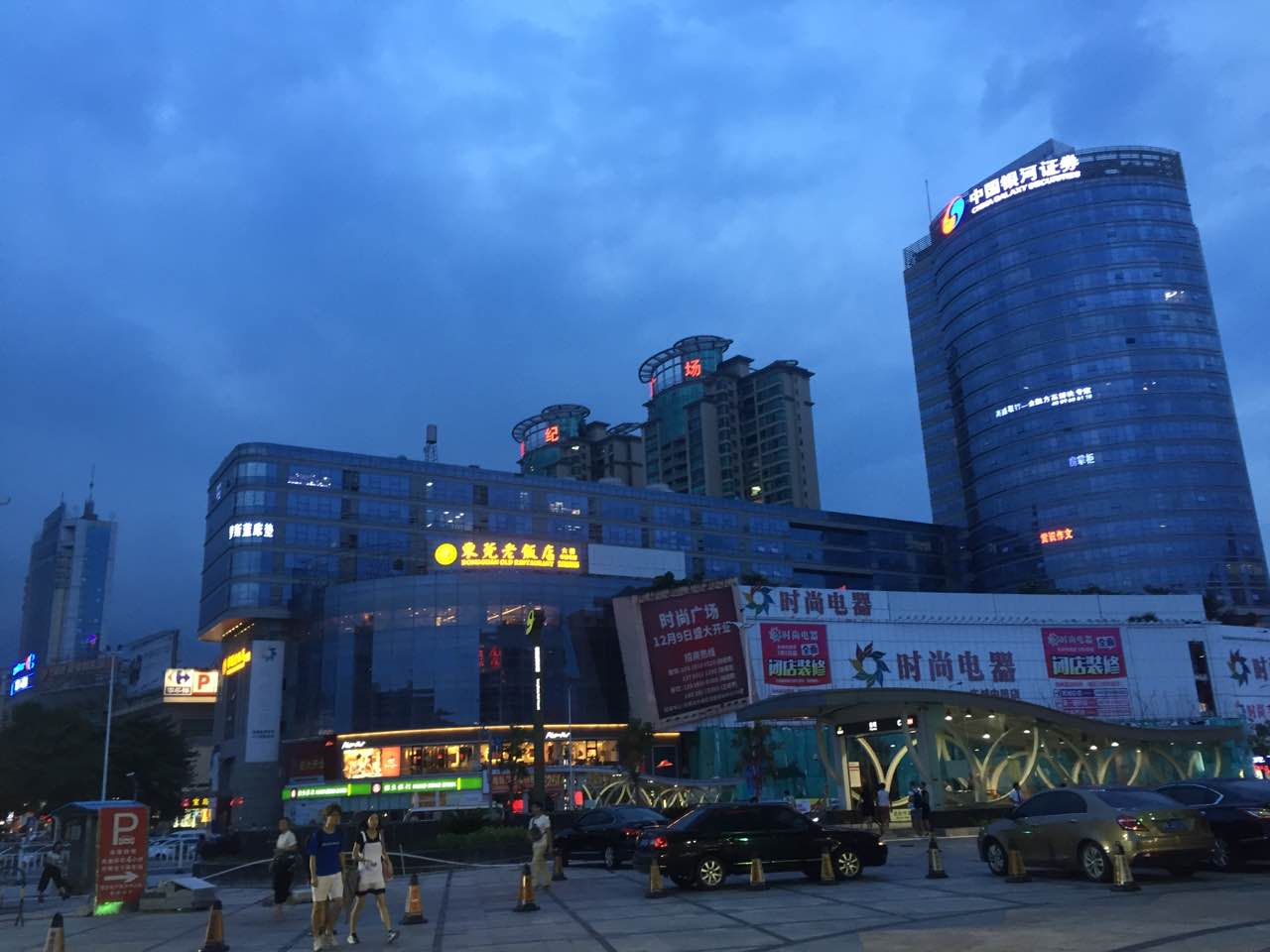
The Shibo Square in Dongcheng substrict

As of 2019, the subdistrict's GDP was ¥58.656 billion, retail sales totaled ¥16.916 billion, fixed asset investment was ¥9.617 billion, international trade totaled ¥50.74 billion, and the subdistrict's tax revenue totaled ¥13.535 billion.

Major enterprises with a presence within Dongcheng Subdistrict include Hsu Fu Chi, Rohm and Haas, Wanshida LCD (万士达液晶), CR Snow, Meiwei Circuits (美维电路), Guangrun Furniture (光润家具), Tecsun, and CYG Insulator Co. LTD (长园高能电气股份有限公司).

Major retail and office centers within Dongcheng Subdistrict include Dongcheng Wanda Square (东城万达广场), Dongcheng Shibo Square (东城世博广场), Xinghe City (星河城), Junhao Business Center (君豪商业中心), and Yujing New Time Square (愉景新时代广场).

== Transport ==
=== Road ===
There are four main highways in Dongcheng Subdistrict. Two expressways, the Dongguan-Shenzhen Expressway and the Guangzhou-Shenzhen Expressway, go through the Dongcheng Subdistrict. 16 buses go through the center of the Dongcheng Subdistrict.

=== Metro ===
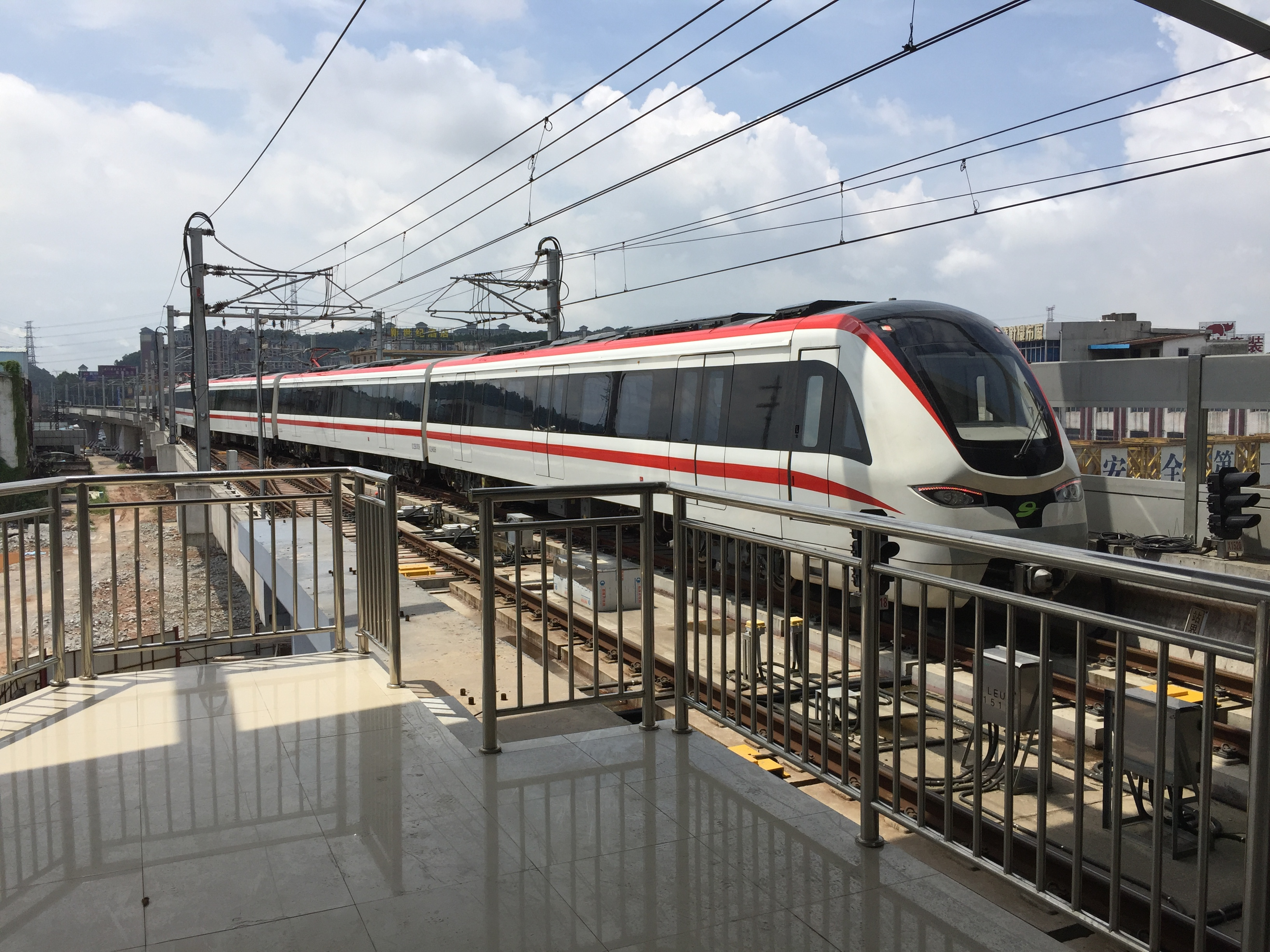
Dongguan Rail Transit Line 2

Line 2 of the Dongguan Rail Transit opened to the public on May 27, 2016, one of the four planned lines to be open as of 2020. Four stations on Line 2 are located within Dongcheng Subdistrict: Qifeng Park, Dongcheng, Xiaqiao, and Lihua Park.

Line 2 is connected to the Guangzhou-Shenzhen-Hong Kong Express Rail and the Guangzhou-Dongguan-Shenzhen Intercity Rail via Humen Station.

Dongcheng Subdistrict Metro Stations
Station name English	Station name Hanzi	Platform types	Transfer/connection
Qifeng Park	旗峰公园		
Dongcheng	东城		
Xiaqiao	下桥		
Liuhua Park	榴花公园		

== Tourist attractions ==
=== Qifeng Park ===
Qifeng City Park (旗峰公园) is a prominent park in Dongguan, covering an area of 1,600 mu. Well known attractions within the park include Huangqi Mountain (黄旗山), Huangqi Guanyin Temple (黄旗观音古庙), and the Huangqi Mountain lanterns. The park is a popular hiking spot for residents of Dongguan.

Huangqi Mountain rises 189 meters above sea level. Huangqi Guanyin Temple, which was built in the Song dynasty, is located at the foot of the hill. During Chinese New Year and other major festivals, tourists come to the park to pray. It is also tradition that people climb Huangqi Mountain during Chinese New Year.

The park is 800 meters away from the Qifeng Park Station, and is 1,800 meters away from Dongcheng Station.

=== Huying Country Park ===
Huying Country Park (虎英郊野公园), located in southeast Dongcheng Subdistrict and formerly known as Huying Tree Farm (虎英林场), is a large park covering an area of 2,979 mu. The park, which opened at the end of 2000, is largely hilly and forested, with its highest point reaching 152 meters in altitude. Popular attractions in the park include Huying Pavilion (虎英阁), Qingyou Gorge (清幽峡), the island within the lake (湖中岛), Yunyu Bridge (云雨桥), Roman Pillar Forest (罗马柱林), and Huanhu Road (环湖路). Huying Country Park also contains the Shaokaochang Sculpture Park (烧烤尝雕塑公园), which has areas of sculptures devoted to important military and scientific figures. Sculptures which depict other matters, like famous ancient and modern figures and animals, can be found scattered throughout the park.

=== Liuhua Park ===
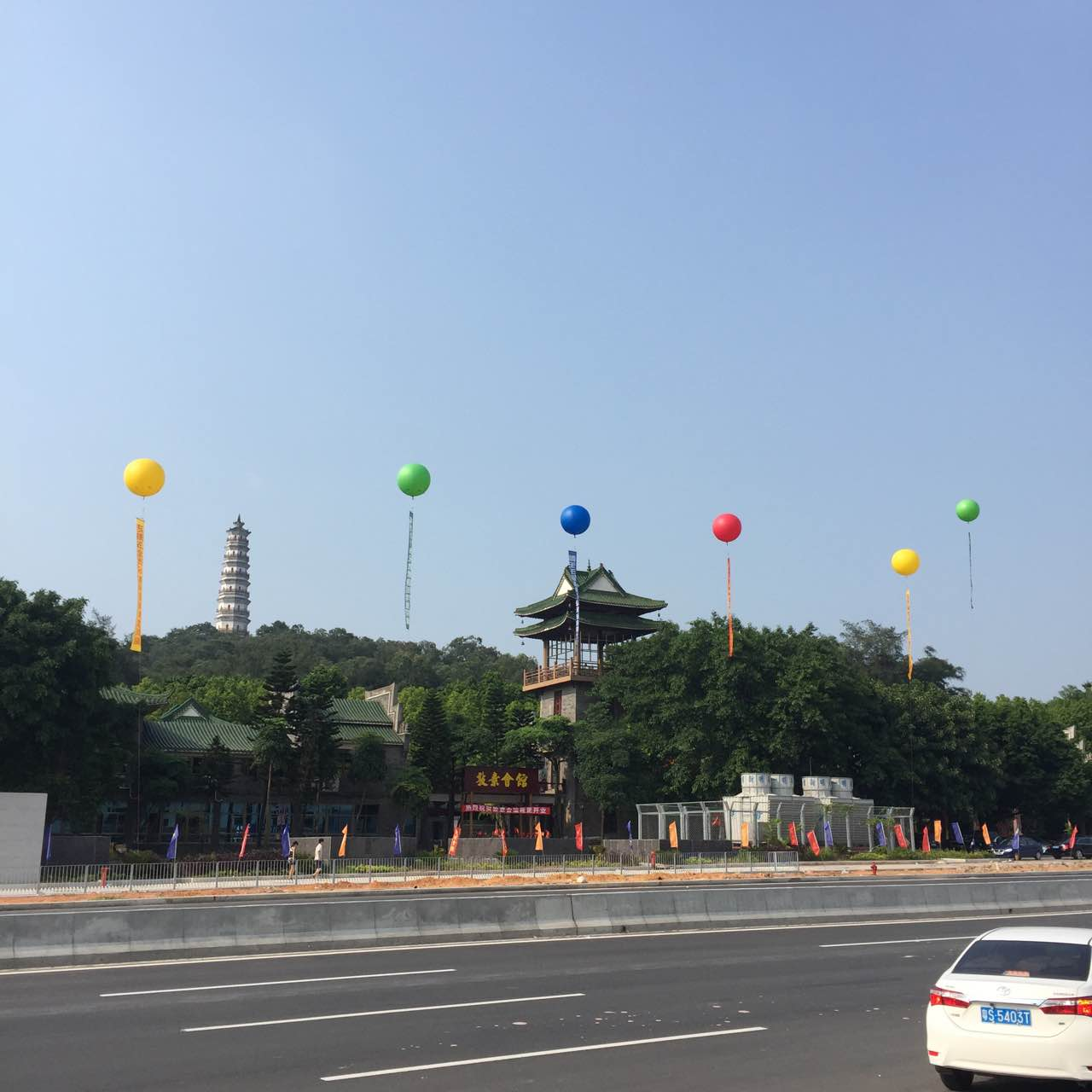
The pavilion in the Liuhua Park

The Liuhua Park (榴花公园) was first built in the Ming dynasty, and it reopened in 1999. It has an area of 0.32 square kilometers, and is near the intersection of Guanlong Highway (莞龙公路) and Guanjie Highway (莞碣公路). The park is open all day and has free admission. It is a key unit of Dongguan's cultural relics protection.

The primary tourist attraction in the Liuhua Park is the Liuhua Pagoda, which was built in the Ming dynasty. In 1938, the first armed resistance to the Japanese occupation of China in Dongguan happened near the Liuhua Pagoda, and a memorial pavilion near the pagoda has been erected to commemorate it.

Others attractions within the park include Honghua Temple, Huaxi Yintang, and Qiniang Lake.

=== Dongcheng Culture Square ===
The Dongcheng Culture Square (东城文化广场) is a multi-functional entertainment venue, is located on Dongcheng Road, with an area of 40,000 square meters. The complex including a 1,300-seat theatre, a gym, a library and an open-air music fountain.

== Education ==
Notable schools within Dongcheng Substrict include Dongcheng Junior Middle School (东城初级中学), Dongcheng No. 1 Middle School (东城第一中学), Dongcheng Lingnan School (东城岭南学校), Dongcheng Primary School (东城小学), Dongcheng No. 5 Primary School (东城第五小学), Primary School attached to Dongguan Normal University (东莞师范附属小学), and Dongguan Chaotian Experimental Primary School (东莞朝天实验小学).

== Healthcare ==
There are 655 medical institutions in Dongcheng Subdistrict. The subdistrict's hospitals include Donghua Hospital attached to Sun Yat-sen University (中山大学附属东华医院), Dongcheng People's Hospital (东城人民医院), Dongguan No. 6 People's Hospital (东莞市第六人民医院), and Dongguan Taixin Hospital (东莞台心医院).
