= Shanmei station =

Metro station in Dongguan, China

Shanmei 珊美
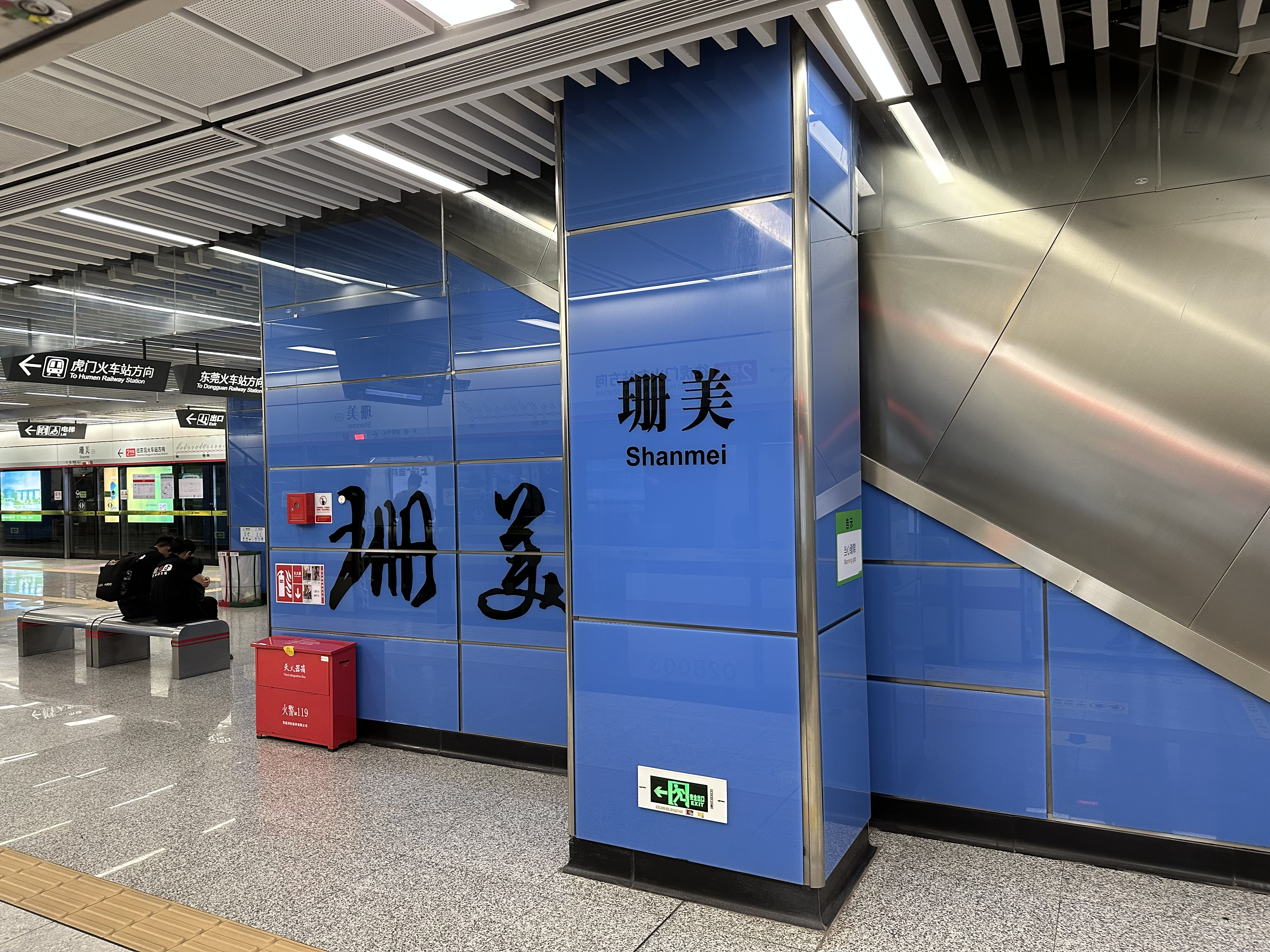

General information
- Location: South Ring Road and Guantai Road Intersection, Dongguan, Guangdong; China
- Coordinates: 22.9295°N 113.6598°E
- Operated by: Dongguan Rail Transit Corporation, Limited
- Line(s): Line 2
- Platforms: Island platform

Other information
- Station code: 213

History
- Opened: 27 May 2016
Location

Shanmei Station (Chinese: 珊美站) is a metro station on Line 2 of the Dongguan Rail Transit in Dongguan, China. It opened on 27 May 2016.

== Station Platform ==
Ground level
Ground level	Entrance

(B1)	Hall	Vending machine, Customer service
(B2)		← Line 2 toward Dongguan railway station (Liaoxia)
(B2)	Island platform, doors will open on the left
(B2)		→ Line 2 toward Humen railway station (Exhibition Center) →

Preceding station	Dongguan Rail Transit	Following station
Exhibition Center towards Humen Railway Station	Line 2	Liaoxia towards Dongguan Railway Station
