= Liaoxia station =

Metro station in Dongguan, China

Liaoxia 寮厦

General information
- Location: Tiyu Road and Guantai Road Intersection, Dongguan, Guangdong; China
- Coordinates: 22°57′4.90″N 113°40′29.68″E
- Operated by: Dongguan Rail Transit Corporation, Limited
- Line: Line 2
- Platforms: Island platform

Other information
- Station code: 212

History
- Opened: 27 May 2016

Services
Preceding station	Dongguan Rail Transit	Following station
Shanmei towards Humen Railway Station	Line 2	Chenwu towards Dongguan Railway Station
Location

Liaoxia Station (Chinese: 寮厦站) is a metro station on Line 2 of the Dongguan Rail Transit in Dongguan, China. It opened on 27 May 2016.

== Station platform ==
Ground level
Ground level	Entrance

(B1)	Hall	Vending machine, Customer service
(B2)		← Line 2 toward Dongguan railway station (Chenwu)
(B2)	Island platform, doors will open on the left
(B2)		→ Line 2 toward Humen railway station (Shanmei) →
