= Chenwu station =

Metro station in Dongguan, China

Chenwu 陈屋
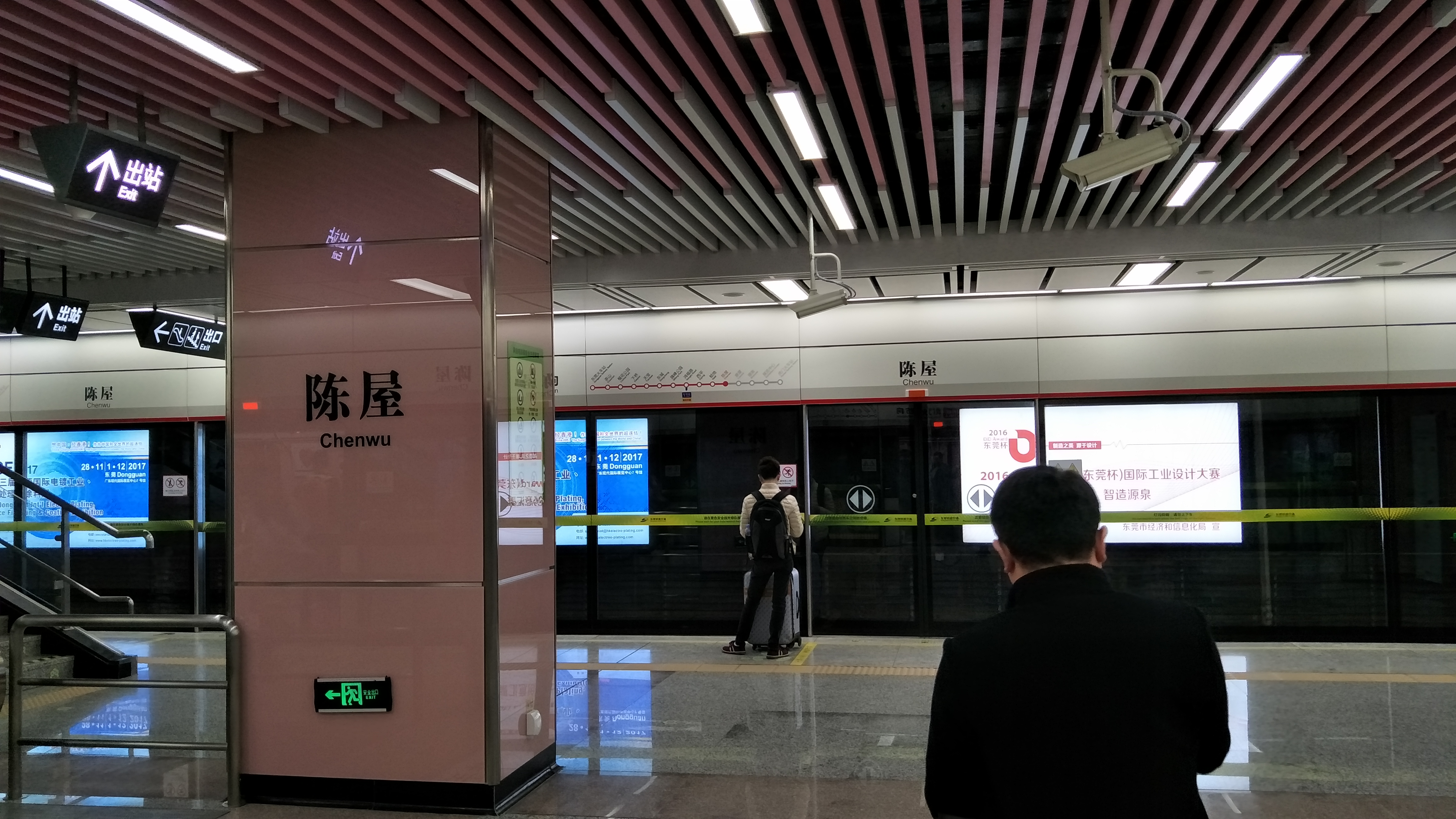
- Station platform

General information
- Location: Guantai Road, Dongguan, Guangdong; China
- Coordinates: 22°57′40.43″N 113°41′8.81″E
- Operated by: Dongguan Rail Transit Corporation, Limited
- Line: Line 2
- Platforms: Island platform

Other information
- Station code: 211

History
- Opened: 27 May 2016

Services
Preceding station	Dongguan Rail Transit	Following station
Liaoxia towards Humen Railway Station	Line 2	Gedi towards Dongguan Railway Station
Location

Chenwu Station (Chinese: 陈屋站) is a metro station on Line 2 of the Dongguan Rail Transit in Dongguan, China. It opened on 27 May 2016.

== Station platform ==
Ground level
Ground level	Entrance

(B1)	Hall	Vending machine, Customer service
(B2)		← Line 2 toward Dongguan railway station (Hadi)
(B2)	Island platform, doors will open on the left
(B2)		→ Line 2 toward Humen railway station (Liaoxia) →
