= Chashan station =

Metro station in Dongguan, China

Chashan 茶山
- Platform to Humen Railway Station

General information
- Location: Chashan North Road and Fangzhong Road Junction, Dongguan, Guangdong; China
- Coordinates: 23°4′58.66″N 113°50′28.61″E
- Operator: Dongguan Rail Transit Corporation, Limited
- Line: Line 2
- Platforms: Island platform

Other information
- Station code: 202

History
- Opened: 27 May 2016
Location

Chashan Station (Chinese: 茶山站) is a metro station on Line 2 of the Dongguan Rail Transit in Dongguan, China. It opened on 27 May 2016.

== Station Platform ==
Ground level
Ground level	Entrance

(B1)	Hall	Vending machine, Customer service
(B2)		← Line 2 toward Dongguan railway station (Dongguan Railway Station)
(B2)	Island platform, doors will open on the left
(B2)		→ Line 2 toward Humen railway station (Liuhua Park) →

Preceding station	Dongguan Rail Transit	Following station
Liuhua Park towards Humen Railway Station	Line 2	Dongguan Railway Station Terminus
