= Liuhua Park station =

Metro station in Dongguan, China

Liuhua Park 榴花公园
- Platform to Humen Railway Station

General information
- Location: Liuhua Road and Guanlong Road Intersection, Dongguan, Guangdong; China
- Coordinates: 23°4′58.94″N 113°48′33.88″E
- Operator: Dongguan Rail Transit Corporation, Limited
- Line: Line 2
- Platforms: Island platform

Other information
- Station code: 203

History
- Opened: 27 May 2016
Location

Liuhua Park Station (Chinese: 榴花公园站) is a metro station on Line 2 of the Dongguan Rail Transit in Dongguan, China. It opened on 27 May 2016.

== Station Platform ==
Ground level
| Ground level | Entrance |

| (B1) | Hall | Vending machine, Customer service |
| (B2) | | ← Line 2 toward Dongguan railway station (Chashan) |
| (B2) | Island platform, doors will open on the left |
| (B2) | | → Line 2 toward Humen railway station (Xiaqiao) → |

| Preceding station | Dongguan Rail Transit | Following station |
|---|---|---|
| Xiaqiao towards Humen Railway Station | Line 2 | Chashan towards Dongguan Railway Station |
