= Gedi station =

Metro station in Dongguan, China

Gedi 蛤地
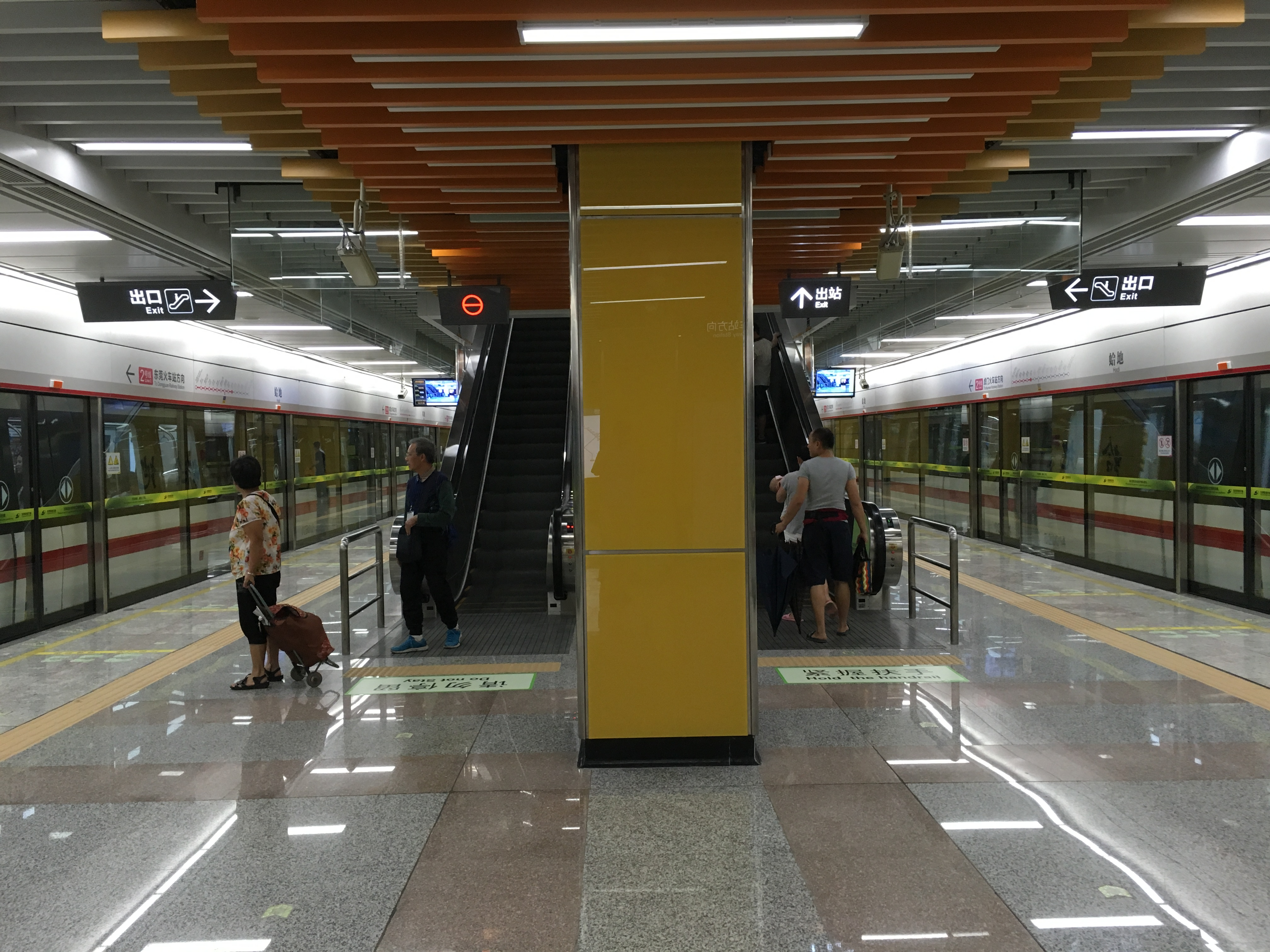

General information
- Location: Yonghusan Road and Dongguan Avenue Junction, Dongguan, Guangdong; China
- Coordinates: 22°58′51.10″N 113°43′25.93″E
- Operated by: Dongguan Rail Transit Corporation, Limited
- Line: Line 2
- Platforms: Island platform

Other information
- Station code: 210

History
- Opened: 27 May 2016
Location

Gedi Station, formerly romanized as Hadi Station, (Chinese: 蛤地站) is a metro station on Line 2 of the Dongguan Rail Transit in Dongguan, China. It opened on 27 May 2016.

== Station Platform ==
Ground level
| Ground level | Entrance |

| (B1) | Hall | Vending machine, Customer service |
| (B2) | | ← Line 2 toward Dongguan railway station (Xiping) |
| (B2) | Island platform, doors will open on the left |
| (B2) | | → Line 2 toward Humen railway station (Chenwu) → |

| Preceding station | Dongguan Rail Transit | Following station |
|---|---|---|
| Chenwu towards Humen Railway Station | Line 2 | Xiping towards Dongguan Railway Station |
