= Exhibition Center station (Dongguan Rail Transit) =

Metro station in Dongguan, China

Exhibition Center 展览中心
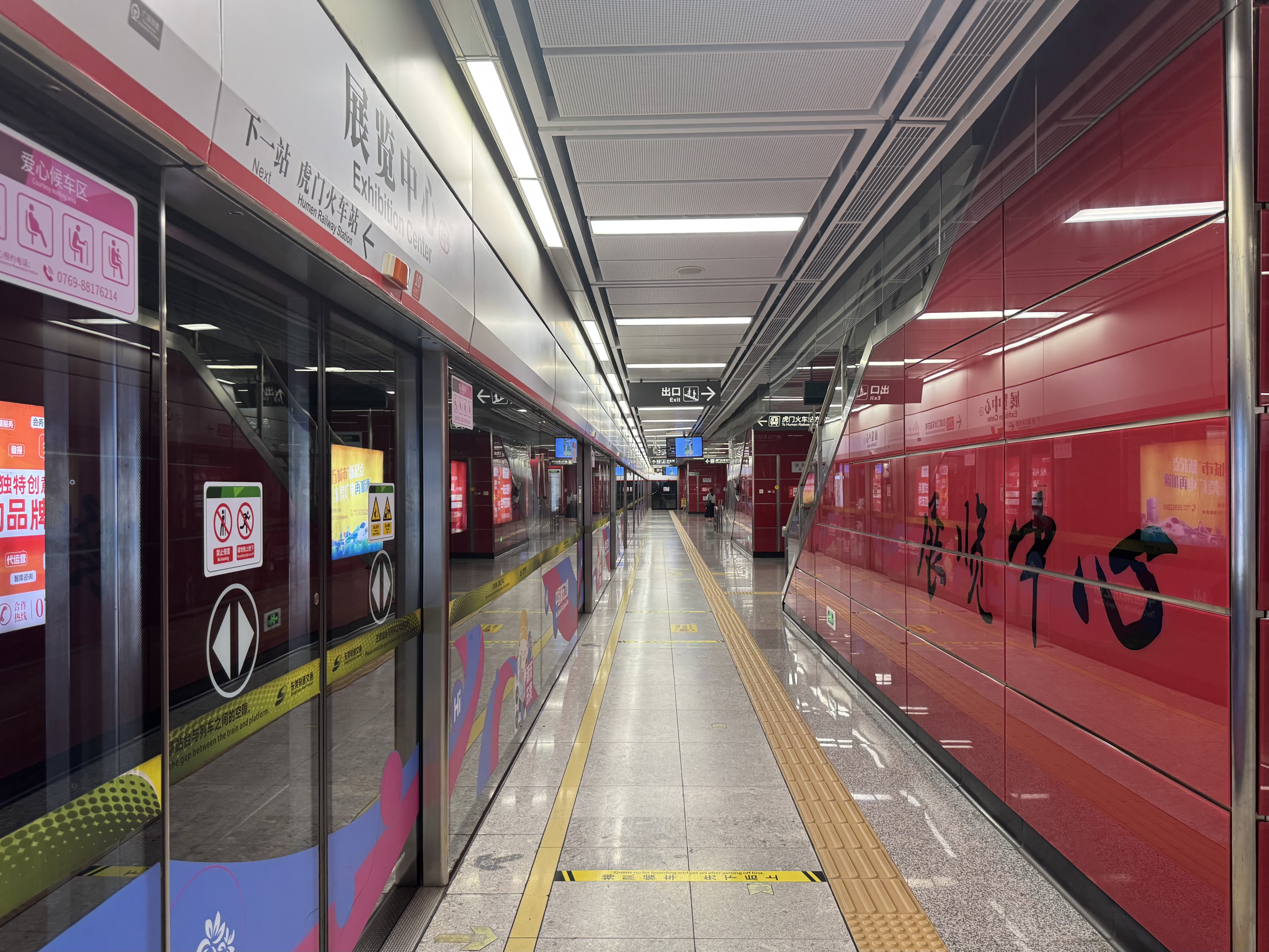
- Platform (towards Humen Railway Station)

General information
- Location: Huizhan East Road, Jiaju Avenue and Guantai Road Intersection, Dongguan, Guangdong; China
- Coordinates: 22°54′17.6″N 113°39′23.4″E
- Operated by: Dongguan Rail Transit Corporation, Limited
- Line: Line 2
- Platforms: Island platform

Other information
- Station code: 214

History
- Opened: 27 May 2016

Services
Preceding station	Dongguan Rail Transit	Following station
Humen Railway Station Terminus	Line 2	Shanmei towards Dongguan Railway Station
Location

Exhibition Center Station (Chinese: 展览中心站) is a metro station on Line 2 of the Dongguan Rail Transit in Dongguan, China. It opened on 27 May 2016.

== Station platform ==
Ground level
Ground level	Entrance

(B1)	Hall	Vending machine, Customer service
(B2)		← Line 2 toward Dongguan railway station (Shanmei)
(B2)	Island platform, doors will open on the left
(B2)		→ Line 2 toward Humen railway station (Humen railway station) →
