= Xiaqiao station (Dongguan Rail Transit) =

Metro station in Dongguan, China

Xiaqiao 下桥
- Platform to Humen Railway Station

General information
- Location: Yinling Street and Guanlong Road Intersection, Dongguan, Guangdong; China
- Coordinates: 23.0677°N 113.7854°E
- Operator: Dongguan Rail Transit Corporation, Limited
- Line: Line 2
- Platforms: Island platform

Other information
- Station code: 204

History
- Opened: 27 May 2016
Location

Xiaqiao Station (Chinese: 下桥站) is a metro station on Line 2 of the Dongguan Rail Transit in Dongguan, China. It opened on 27 May 2016.

== Station platform ==
Ground level
Ground level	Entrance

(B1)	Hall	Vending machine, Customer service
(B2)		← Line 2 toward Dongguan railway station (Liuhua Park)
(B2)	Island platform, doors will open on the left
(B2)		→ Line 2 toward Humen railway station (Tianbao) →

Preceding station	Dongguan Rail Transit	Following station
Tianbao towards Humen Railway Station	Line 2	Liuhua Park towards Dongguan Railway Station
