= Huangjiang, Guangdong =

Huangjiang 黄江镇
- Town
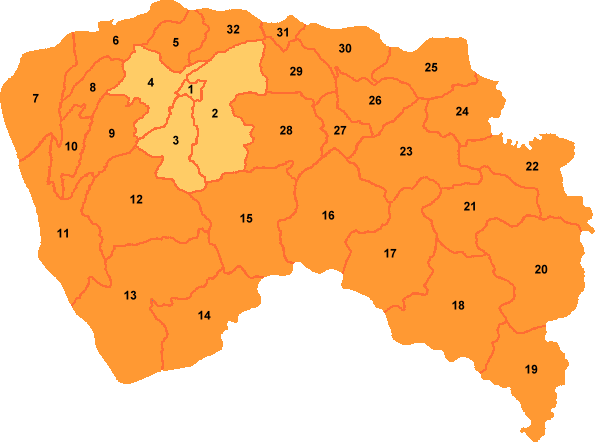
- Huangjiang is labelled '17' on this map of Dongguan

- Location in Guangdong
- Coordinates: 22°54′55″N 114°00′13″E
- Country: People's Republic of China
- Province: Guangdong
- Prefecture-level city: Dongguan
- Time zone: UTC+8 (China Standard)

Huangjiang (simplified Chinese: 黄江镇; traditional Chinese: 黃江鎮; pinyin: Huángjiāng zhèn) is a town under the jurisdiction of the prefecture-level city of Dongguan in Guangdong Province, China. It is located to the southeast of downtown Dongguan and borders Shenzhen's Bao'an and Guangming districts to the southwest and south, respectively.

== Transportation ==
Huangjiang will host 5 Dongguan Rail Transit stations under the current plans for construction of Line 4:

1. Huangjiangbei - Line 1
2. Huangniupu - Line 1
3. Huangjiang Center - Line 1 & Line 4
4. Huangjiangdong - Line 4
5. Huangjiangnan - Line 1
