= Shilong railway station =

Railway station in Dongguan, China

Shilong railway station 石龙站
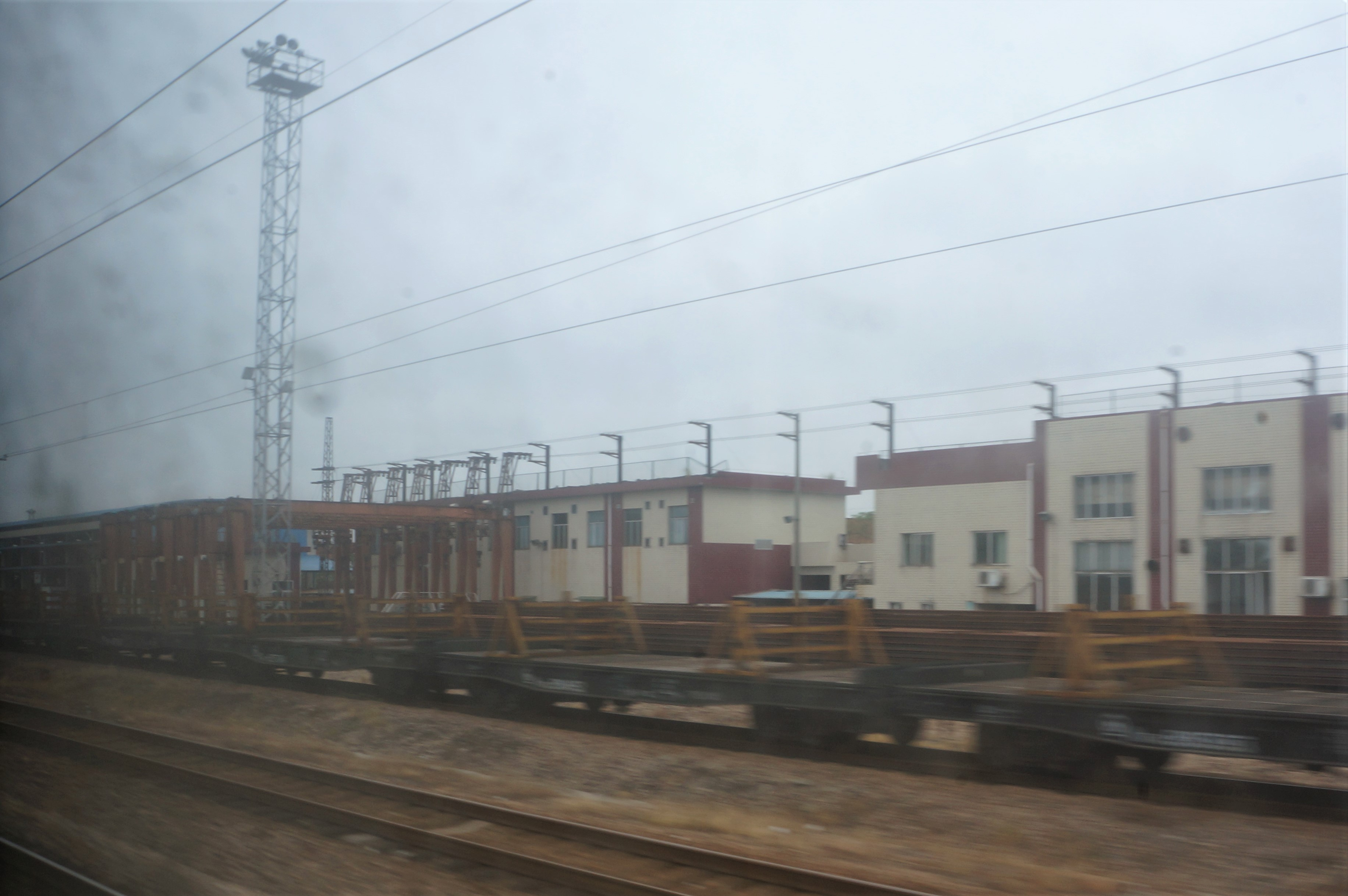
- Yard I of Shilong station

General information
- Other names: Shilong Railway International Logistics Center [石龙铁路国际物流中心]; Honghai station [红海站]
- Location: Shilong Town, Dongguan City, Guangzhou; China
- Coordinates: 23.123636°N 113.840023°E
- System: Freight station
- Owner: CR Guangzhou
- Operator: Guangshen Railway Co.
- Line: Guangshen railway
- Tracks: 4

Other information
- Station code: TWIL code: 23756; Telegraph code: SLQ; Pinyin code: slo

Services
Preceding station	China Railway	Following station
Shitan towards Guangzhou	Guangzhou–Shenzhen railway	Dongguan towards Shenzhen
Location

Dongguan Railway Port of Entry
- Interactive map of Dongguan Railway Port of Entry
- Native name: 东莞铁路口岸 Shilong International Railway Logistics Center

Shilong station (in Cantonese reading Shek Lung station) also known as the Shilong Railway International Logistics Center is a third-class freight station in Dongguan City, Guangdong province, on the Guangshen Railway. Since 2015, it is a temporary inland railway Port of Entry, part of the Dongguan land port of entry.

The station used to include an important passenger station in the Guangzhen line that was a stop for the CRH trains between Guangzhou and Shenzhen, with 170 passenger train movements every day, but it was closed in 2014.

== History ==
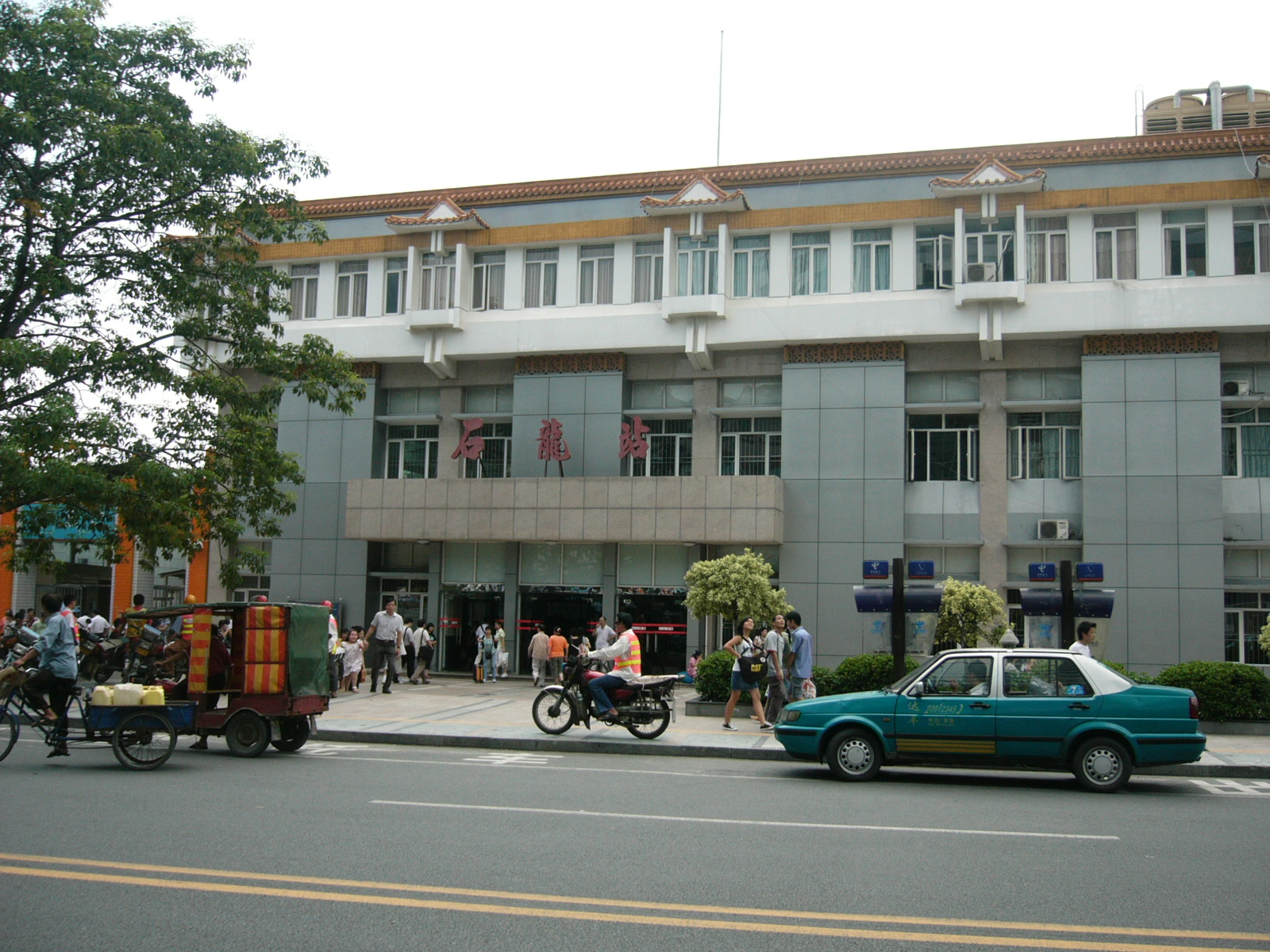

The station was opened in 1911 as the Shilong Central Station of the newly completed Guangzhou-Kowloon Railway (Chinese Section). Since the opening of the Hong Kong-Guangzhou Through Train on 15 October 1911, Shilong Station became the main stop in the Dongguan area, as it was a necessary watering stop for the steam trains.

When Chiang Kai-shek led his army to the east to attack warlord Chen Jiongming in 1925, the headquarters of the Eastern Expedition Army was located in a carriage parked at Shilong railway station. To this day, a sculpture of Sun Yat-sen inspecting the Shilong Railway Station still stands at the entrance of the station.

After the establishment of the PRC and the closure of the border with Hong Kong, the Guangzhou-Kowloon Through Train service was interrupted on 14 October 1949, and the Guangzhou-Kowloon Railway (Chinese Section) was renamed the Guangzhou-Shenzhen Railway. Although the through train service was resumed on 4 April 1979, it no longer stopped at Shilong station.

Shilong Station was expanded three times in 1984, 2001, and 2006, creating a peculiar two-yard layout extending to both sides of the Dongjiang Northern Branch. The passenger station (Yard II) was a major stop in the high-speed intercity service between Shenzhen and Guangzhou until it was closed and all services moved to the new Dongguan railway station (also known as "New Shilong station"). The last D-7064 train left the station at 11:21 pm of 7 January, and at 00:01 of 8 January 2014, Shilong Railway Station officially stopped passenger services. The Yard I became the Shilong Railway International Logistics Center, exclusively dedicated to freight.

== Station layout ==
=== Shilong International Railway Logistics Center ===
The Shilong Yard I is also known as the Honghai station (紅海站). The station is located on tracks III and IV of the Guangshen Railway, on the border between Dongguan and Guangzhou, next to Guanzeng Road, Sanjiang Community, Shitan Town, Zengcheng district. It has 4 freight station tracks. It has spur tracks to the Honghai Rail Welding Base of the Guangzhou repair stage., a spur to the China Merchant's Group Dongguan Sinotrans Logistics Shilong Port Area,, a spur to the Shilong Station Cargo Yard, and an industrial siding for the Shilong Wood Factory. In 2017, the Shilong International Railway Logistics Center was built on the east side of the Honghai station. It was completed in 2019 and handles mostly container freight. Shilong Freight Yard is the starting point for many express mail trains mail. and it is a terminal of the China-Europe Express (中欧班列) system.

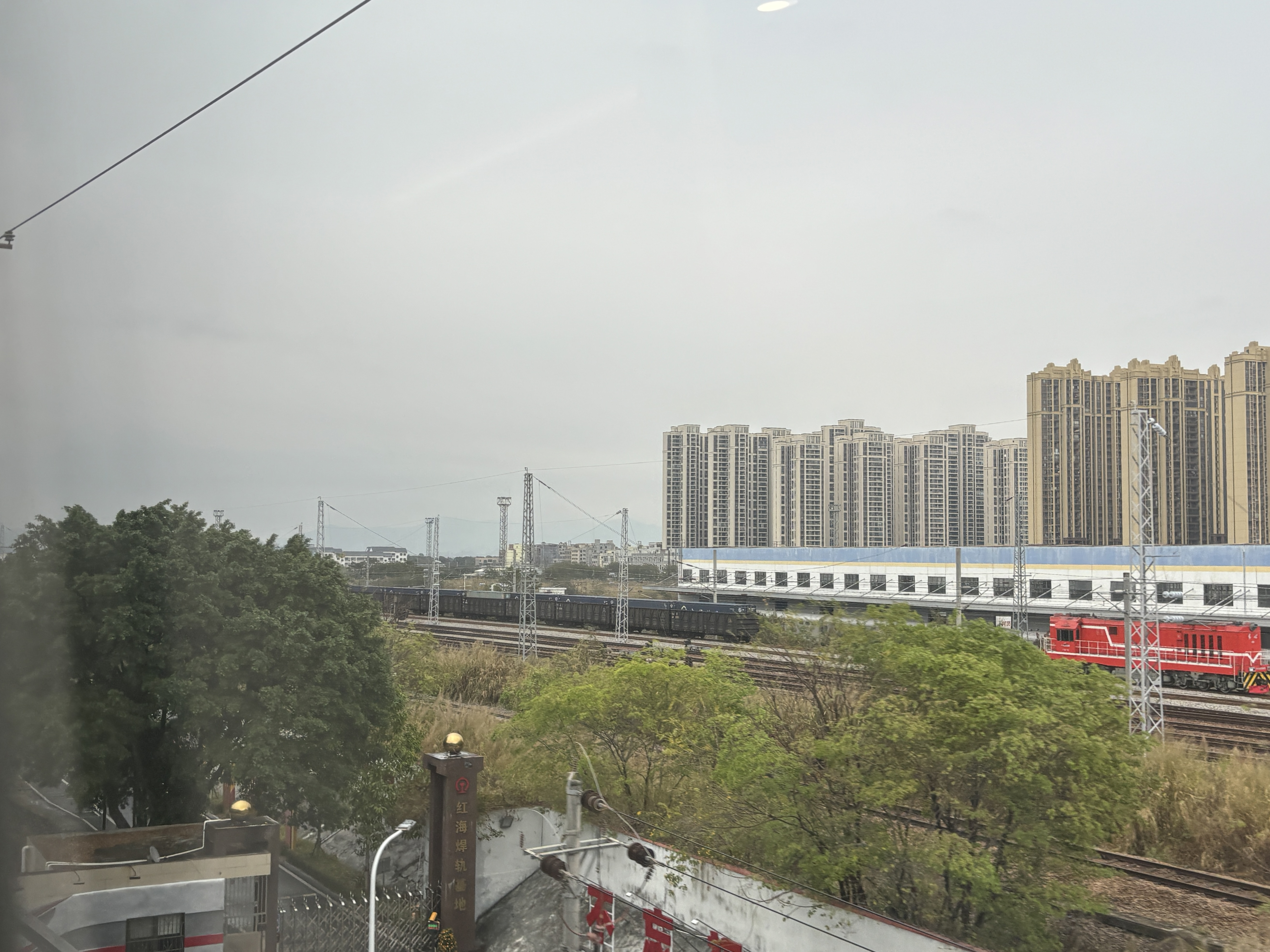
Yard I and Honghai CWR Center at Shilong Station

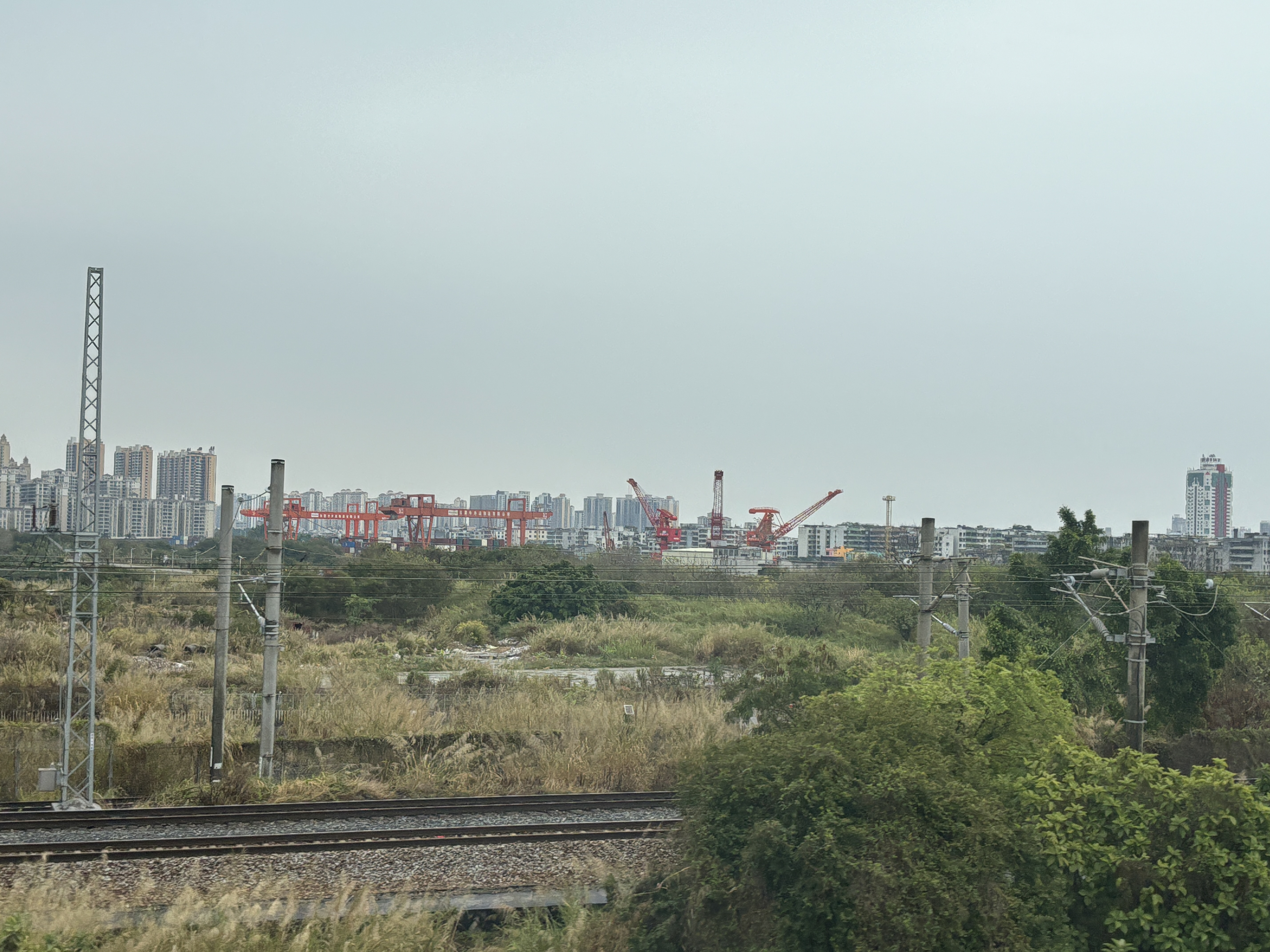
Freight yard of Shilong station Shilong Port Area freight yard

=== Shilong passenger station ===
The Shilong Yard II, or the passenger station, was located on the southern side of the Shilong North Bridge over the Dongjiang North Branch.

The first-level platforms were used for the Guangshen Railway's tracks III and IV (the conventional speed tracks), and there were two central through-tracks and two side station tracks on an elevated roadbed. It was mostly used for long-distance passenger trains.

The second-level platforms were used by Guangshen Railway's tracks I and II (the high-speed tracks). There were two side platforms, located on a viaduct two to three stories above the ground. The platform was equipped with eaves and platform screen doors (originally electric metal fences, the first train station in China with platform screen doors) to prevent passengers from falling into the tracks, which allowed Guangzhou-Shenzhen intercity trains to overpass the station at high speeds (the slipstream wind and wake of trains above 140 km/h can be dangerous in open platforms).

The lower Shilong station has been demolished, thought the platforms remain and the station tracks have been retained as a passing loop for lines III-IV. The upper station is still extant but it is inoperative as of 2025.

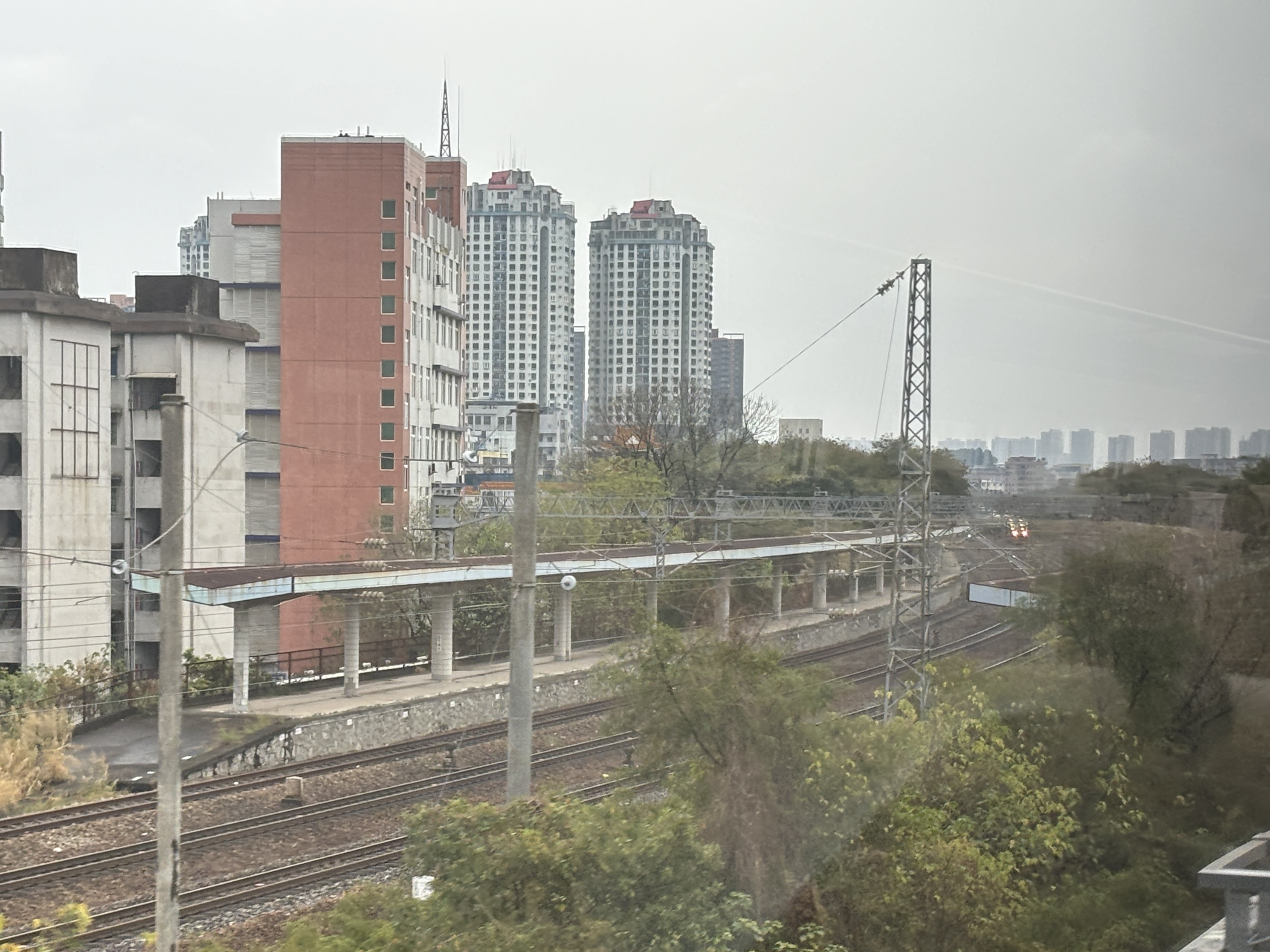
Conventional trains platform

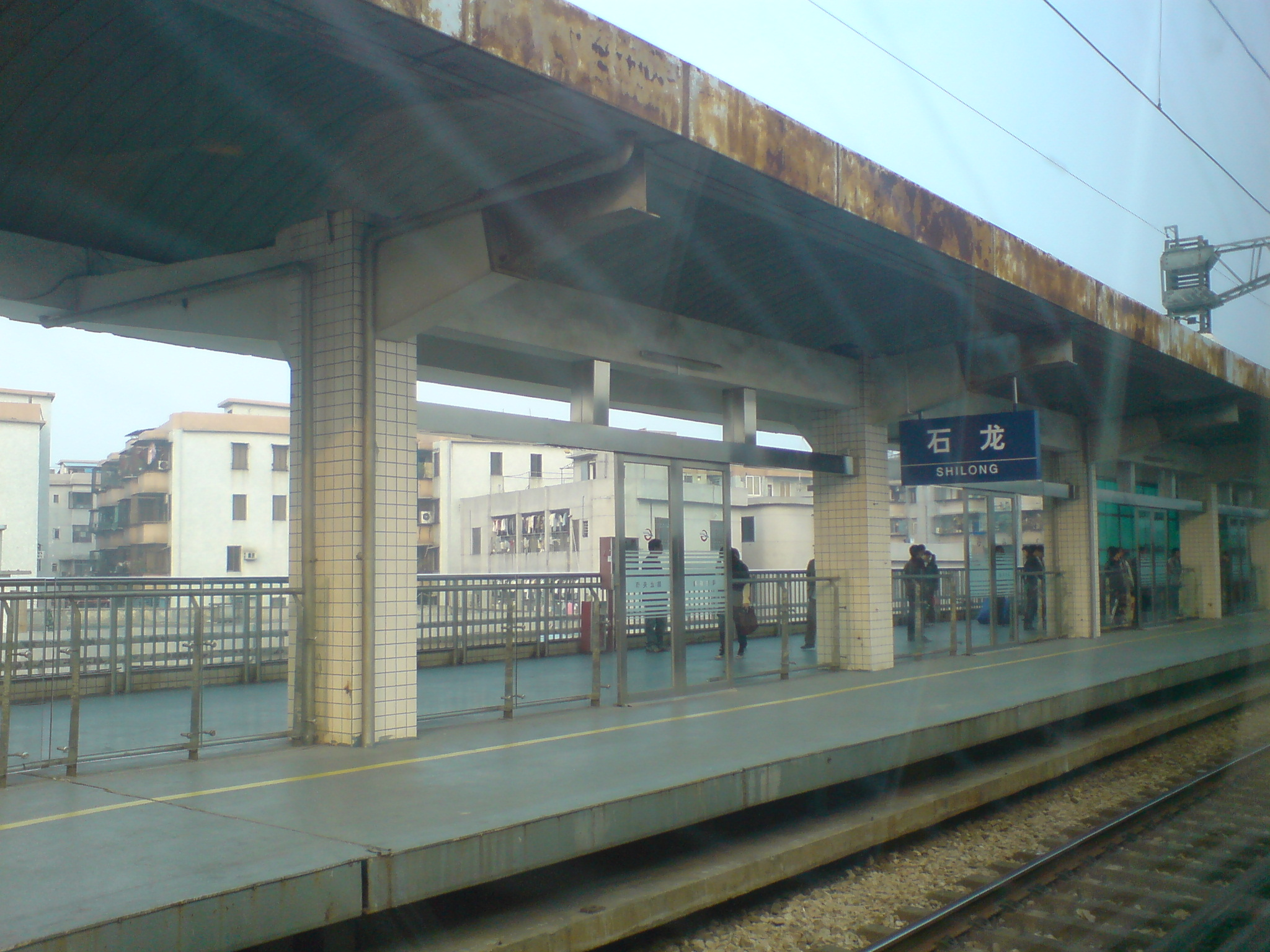
High-speed elevated platform
