= Chashan =

Chashan 茶山镇
- Town
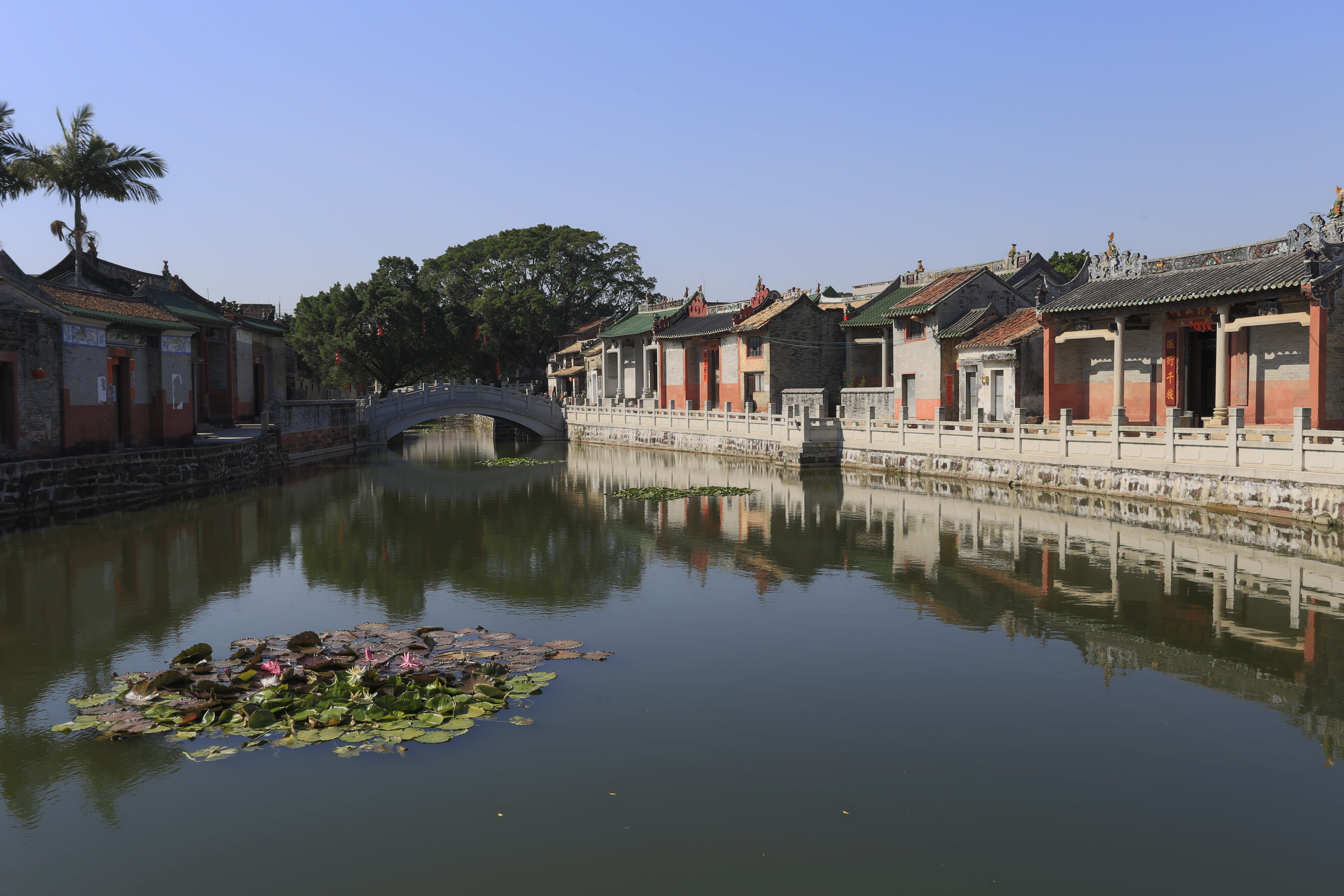
- Nanshe Village in Chashan

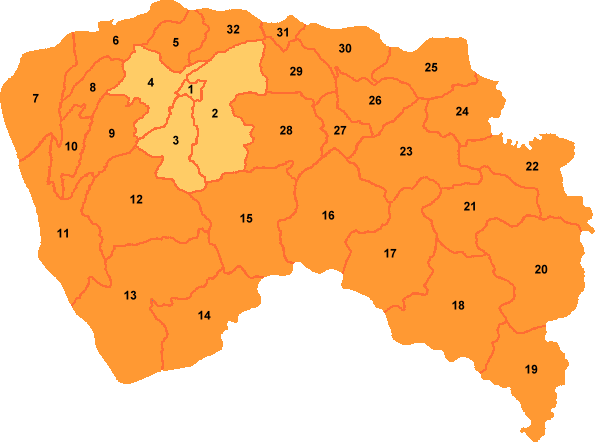
- Chashan is labeled '29' on this map of Dongguan

- Location in Guangdong
- Coordinates: 23°04′36″N 113°52′11″E
- Country: People's Republic of China
- Province: Guangdong
- Prefecture-level city: Dongguan
- Time zone: UTC+8 (China Standard)

Chashan (Chinese: 茶山; pinyin: cháshān) is a town under the direct administration of the prefecture-level city of Dongguan, Guangdong Province, China. It is located 11.5 kilometres (7.1 mi) northeast of the prefecture-level city centre.

== Transport ==
There are buses connecting the city of Dongguan, Guangzhou, Shenzhen and Dongguan other townships. Travel by bus is the best way to reach Chashan.

=== Railway ===
- Dongguan railway station (Guangzhou-Shenzhen Railway, Guangzhou - Shenzhen) (Dongguan train terminal commenced service on January 4, 2014)
- 2 Dongguan Rail Transit Line
- Though the Kowloon Canton Railway runs through Chashan, it is not a convenient way to travel from Guangzhou (Canton), Shenzhen or Kowloon in Hong Kong to Chashan due to the time required.

=== Highway ===
- Wanlong Road (Dongguan city - Shilong)
- Dan Dagong Road (Shilong Town - Da Lingshan Town)
- Expressway east Dongguan (Songshan Songshan Lake Road Interchange fast - Bridge Town Bridge Long Road)
- Tea Cross-Island Highway (Chashan - Hengli Town)

== Travel ==
- Dongyue
- Nanshe Ming and Qing village
- Mai village house

== Notable fruit ==
Chashan is noted for its litchi fruit (Chinese: 荔枝) which comes from the litchi chinensis, a Chinese tree that bears bright red fruits, each with a single large seed. Litchi taste best between May and June.
