= Line 4 (Dongguan Rail Transit) =

Planned metro line in Dongguan, China

- 4

Overview
- Other name: R4
- Status: Under Construction
- Locale: Dongguan, China
- Termini: Huangjiang Center & Guanguang Road; Qingxi Coach Terminal
- Stations: 12

Service
- Type: Rapid transit
- System: Dongguan Rail Transit
- Operator(s): Dongguan Rail Transit Corporation, Limited (东莞市轨道交通有限公司)

Technical
- Number of tracks: 2
- Character: Underground and elevated
- Track gauge: 1,435 mm (4 ft 8 1/2 in)

Line 4 of the Dongguan Rail Transit (Chinese: 东莞轨道交通4号线; pinyin: Dōngguǎn Guǐdào Jiāotōng Sì Hào Xiàn) is a planned rapid transit line in Dongguan, Guangdong Province, China. It has a planned 12 stations and its Y-shaped design means that it has 3 terminating stations: Huangjiang Center (interchange with Line 1), Qingxi Coach Terminal and Guanguang Road. The construction date for Line 4 has not yet been published.

== Stations ==
=== Main line ===
- Huangjiang Center - Interchange with Line 1
- Huangjiangdong
- Tangxiaxi
- Tangxia Center (Interchange with the Branch of Line 4)
- Dongxing Avenue
- Tangxiadong
- Qingxinan
- Qingxi
- Qingxi Coach Terminal

=== Branch ===
- Tangxia Center (Interchange with Main line)
- Shaping Road
- Keyuan Avenue
- Guanguang Road

== List of planned lines ==
- Line 1
- Line 2
- Line 3
- Line 4

== See also ==
- Guangzhou Metro
- FMetro
- Shenzhen Metro
- List of rapid transit systems
- Metro systems by annual passenger rides
