= Line 2 (Dongguan Rail Transit) =

Subway line in Dongguan, China

- 2
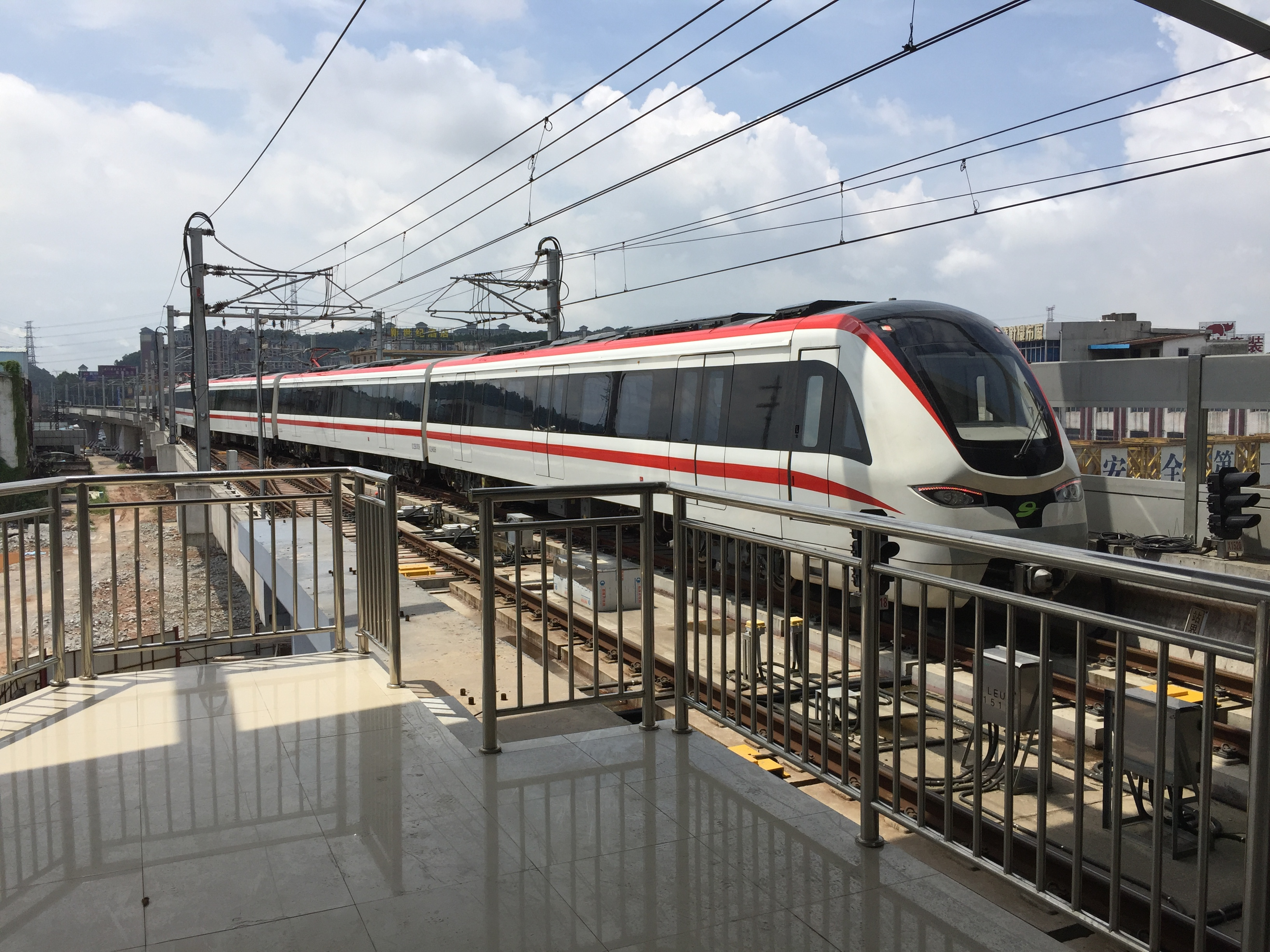
- Line 2 train leaving Humen railway station

Overview
- Other name: R2
- Status: In operation
- Locale: Dongguan, China
- Termini: Humen Railway Station; Dongguan Railway Station
- Stations: 15 (in operation)

Service
- Type: Rapid transit
- System: Dongguan Rail Transit
- Operator(s): Dongguan Rail Transit Corporation, Limited
- Rolling stock: 6-car Type B by CRRC Nanjing Puzhen & Bombardier Transportation

History
- Opened: 27 May 2016; 10 years ago

Technical
- Line length: 37.7 km (23.43 mi)
- Number of tracks: 2
- Character: Underground and elevated
- Track gauge: 1,435 mm (4 ft 8 1/2 in)
- Operating speed: 120 km/h designed, operating maximum 110km/h

Line 2 of the Dongguan Rail Transit (Chinese: 东莞轨道交通2号线; Jyutping: dung^{1} gun^{1} gwai^{2} dou^{6} gaau^{1} tung^{1} hou^{6} sin^{3}; pinyin: Dōngguǎn Guǐdào Jiāotōng Èr Hào Xiàn) is a rapid transit line in Dongguan. The line currently has 15 stations, 14 underground and 1 elevated, and is 37.743 kilometres (23.452 mi) long, from Dongguan railway station to Humen railway station. It opened on 27 May 2016. Construction of Line 2 began on 26 March 2010.

== Opening timeline ==
Segment	Commencement	Length	Station(s)	Name
Humen Railway Station — Dongguan Railway Station	27 May 2016	37.7 km (23.43 mi)	15	Phase 1 & 2

== Stations ==
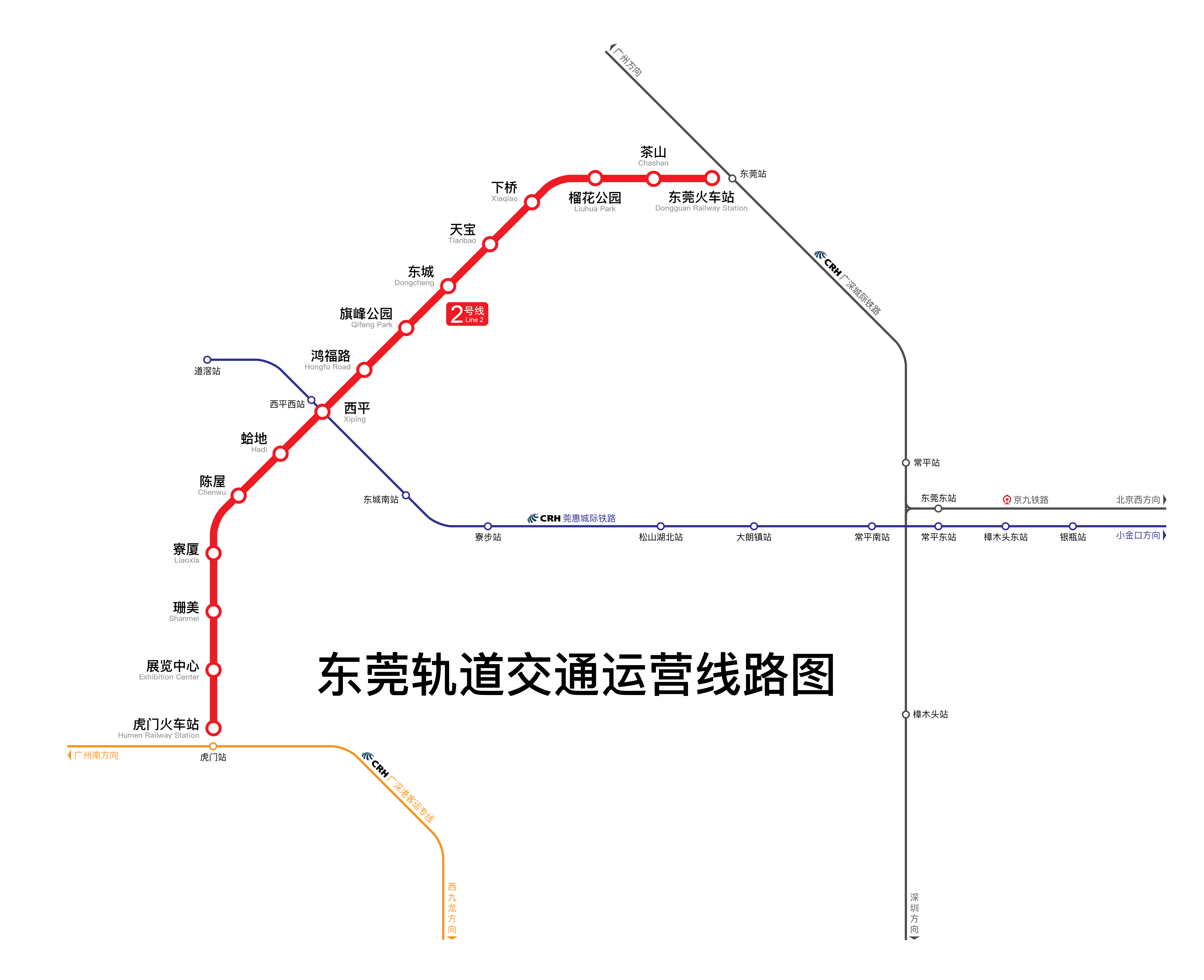
The map of Line 2 prior to 2025.

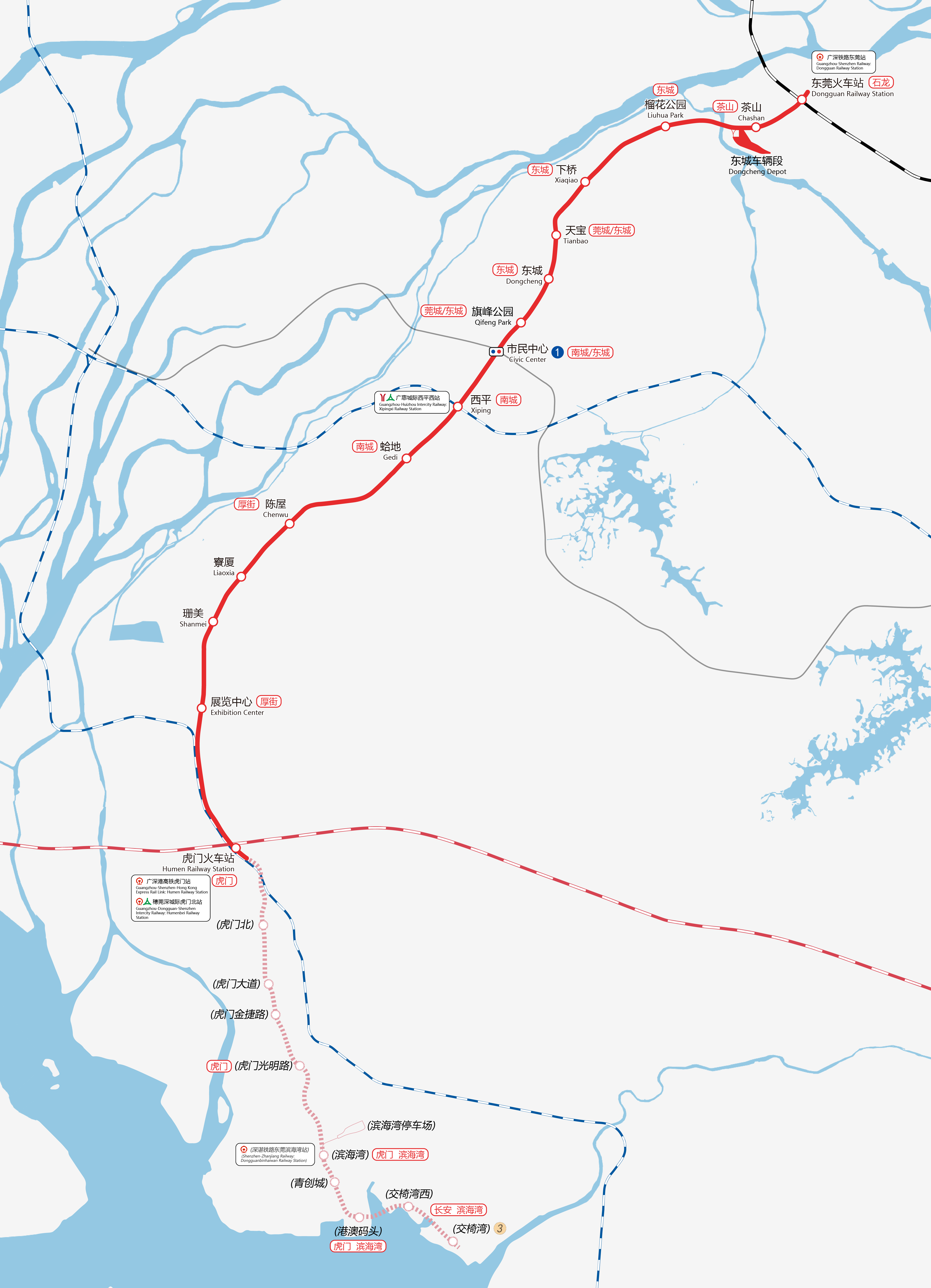
Route map of Line 2, including Phase 3 under construction.

Station No.	Station name		Connections	Nearby bus stops	Distance km		Location
Station No.	English	Chinese	Connections	Nearby bus stops	Distance km		Location
215	Humen Railway Station	虎门火车站	IUQ HMB GZ-SZ-HK GSICR	L1 Shatian 4 (沙田4); Houjie 6 (厚街6); Houjie 7 (厚街7); Humen 8 (虎门8); Humen 10 (虎门10); Express 15 (公交快线15); Express 21 (公交快线21); 801 802 808 841 846 855	0.00	0.00	Humen
214	Exhibition Center	展览中心		L1 Houjie 6 (厚街6) 801 802 806 808 841	1.94	1.94	Houjie
213	Shanmei	珊美		L1 Shatian 1 (沙田1) Houjie 3 (厚街3) Houjie 7 (厚街7) Houjie 21 (厚街21) 801 802 806 808 825 841	3.19	5.13	Houjie
212	Liaoxia	寮厦		L1 Houjie 1 (厚街1) Houjie 17 (厚街17) Houjie 20 (厚街20) 802 808 831 841 856	3.26	8.39	Houjie
211	Chenwu	陈屋		L1 Houjie 13 (厚街13) Houjie 15 (厚街15) Houjie 16 (厚街16) 802 831 841	2.22	10.61	Houjie
210	Gedi	蛤地		Express 1 (公交快线1) 34 X12	1.61	12.22	Nancheng
209	Xiping	西平	EGQ GH	850	1.61	13.83	Nancheng
208	Civic Center	市民中心	1	C2 C4 X5 9 X11 X13 14 19 27 36 41 46 328 862	1.46	15.29	Nancheng
207	Qifeng Park	旗峰公园		1 K1 LG1 K4 X6 14 18 23 27 37 52 56 X11	2.35	17.64	Dongcheng
206	Dongcheng	东城		4 K4 14 17 27 45 47 56	2.33	19.97	Dongcheng
205	Tianbao	天宝		K4 5 K6 Gaoshe 9 (高涉9) 13 14 X16 X23 27 49 50 51	4.82	24.79	Guancheng
204	Xiaqiao	下桥		L2 C3 K3 K4 Gaoshe 9 (高涉9) X9 X18 19 24 25 32 33 858	1.93	26.72	Dongcheng
203	Liuhua Park	榴花公园		K3 Gaoshe 9 (高涉9) 13 19 24 25 47 55 821 822 829 852	2.39	29.11	Dongcheng
202	Chashan	茶山		Chashan 1 (茶山1) Chashan 3 (茶山3) A5 A9 859 861	2.73	31.84	Chashan
201	Dongguan Railway Station	东莞火车站	GS RTQ	Chashan 1 (茶山1) Shilong 1 (石龙1) Chashan 2 (茶山2) Shilong 2 (石龙2) Chashan 3 (茶山3) Shilong 3 (石龙3) Chashan 4 (茶山4) Shilong 4 (石龙4) A5 Shilong 5 (石龙5) Chashan 6 (茶山6) Shilong 7 (石龙7) Shilong 8 (石龙8) A9 X18 47 805 805A 807 809 813 821 826 828 829 852 859 861	5.21	37.05	Shilong

== Future Development ==
=== Phase 3 ===
Phase 3 of Line 2 is 17.1 km in length with 9 stations. Construction started in August 2022. It is expected to open in 2027.

Station list

1. Humen North (虎门北)
2. Humen Avenue (虎门大道)
3. Humen Jinjie Road (虎门金捷路)
4. Humen Guangming Road (虎门光明路)
5. Binhaiwan (滨海湾)
6. Qingchuangcheng (青创城)
7. Hong Kong and Macau (Gang'ao) Ferry Terminal (港澳码头)
8. Jiaoyiwan West (交椅湾西)
9. Jiaoyiwan (交椅湾) (interchange with Line 3 and the Northern extension of Shenzhen Metro Line 20 in long-term planning)

== See also ==
- Guangzhou Metro
- FMetro
- Shenzhen Metro
- List of rapid transit systems
- Metro systems by annual passenger rides
