= Dongguan railway station (Guangdong) =

Railway station in Dongguan, Guangdong, China

Dongguan 东莞
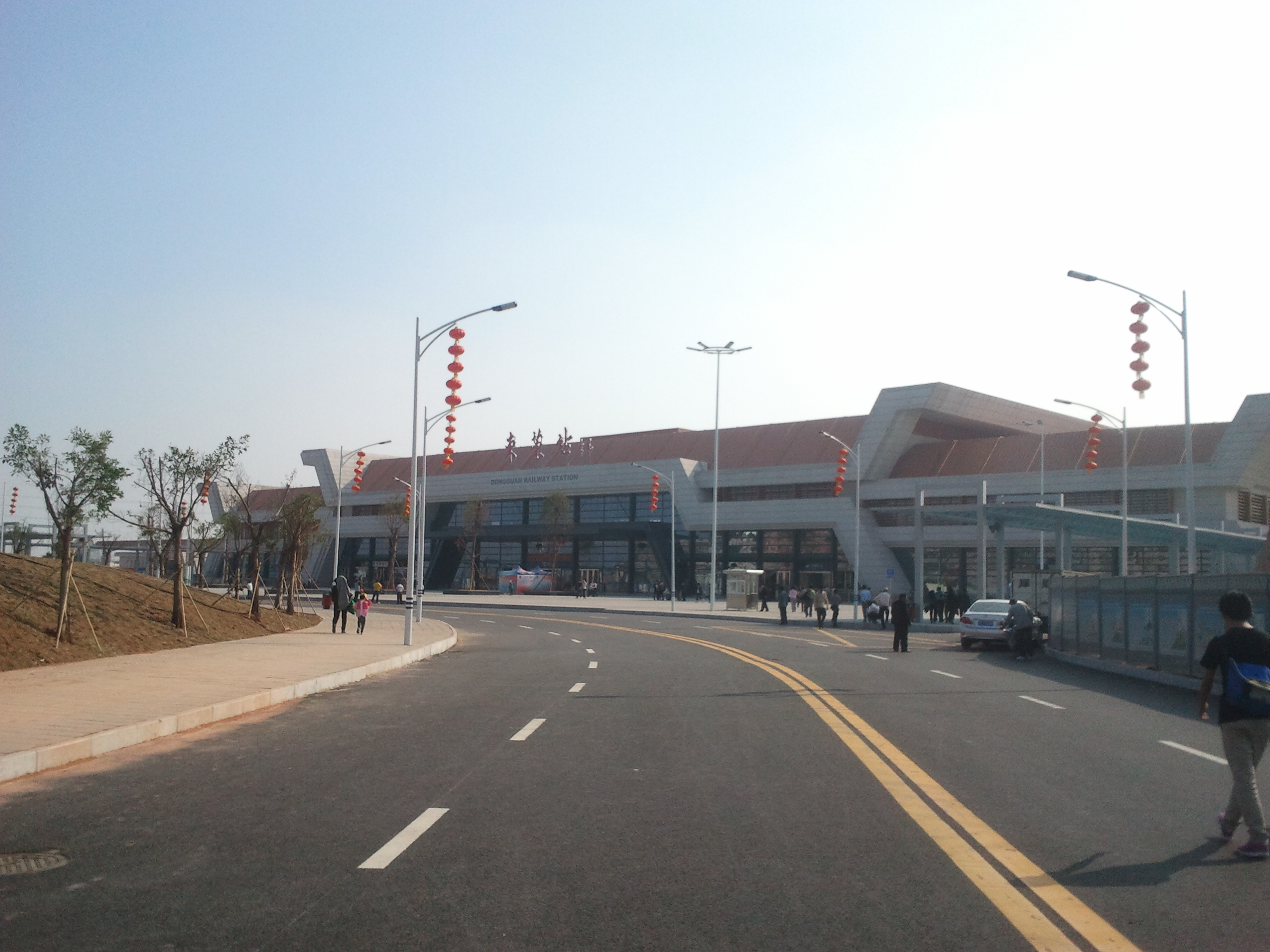

General information
- Location: Between Chashan and Shilong, Dongguan, Guangdong; China
- Coordinates: 23°05′29″N 113°51′17″E
- Operator: Guangshen Railway Company (a subsidiary of the Guangzhou Railway Group); Dongguan Rail Transit Corporation, Limited
- Lines: Guangshen Railway; Line 2
- Platforms: 4

Other information
- Station code: TMIS code: 23757; Telegraph code: RTQ; Pinyin code: DGU; Metro: 201

History
- Opened: January 8, 2014
Location

Dongguan railway station
- Simplified Chinese: 东莞站
Transcriptions
Standard Mandarin
- Hanyu Pinyin: Dōngguǎn Zhàn
Yue: Cantonese
- Jyutping: dung1 gun2 zaam6

New Shilong railway station
- Simplified Chinese: 新石龙站
Transcriptions
Standard Mandarin
- Hanyu Pinyin: Xīn Shílóng Zhàn
Yue: Cantonese
- Jyutping: san1 sek6 lung4 zaam6

Dongguan railway station (Chinese: 东莞站), also known as New Shilong railway station (新石龙站) is a railway station on the Guangzhou–Shenzhen Railway, located between Chashan and Shilong, Dongguan, Guangdong in China. The station is designed by He Jingtang, a prominent Chinese architect and professor at the South China University of Technology's school of architecture. It started to operate on January 8, 2014, which replaced Shilong railway station for the passenger train services.

This station has Guangzhou-Shenzhen intercity Multiple unit train (CRH) services and long-distance train services. It also connected with Line 2 of the Dongguan Rail Transit.

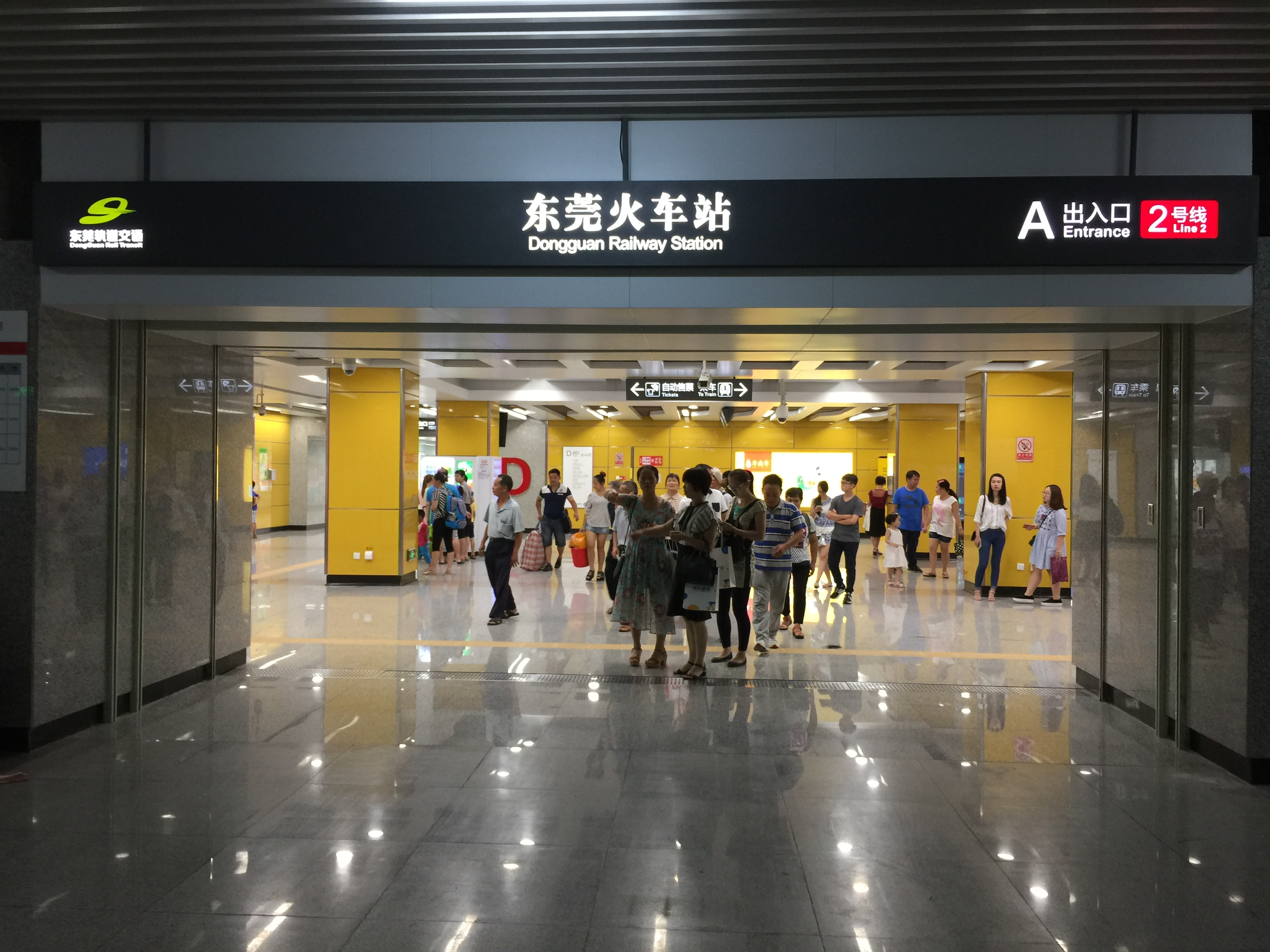
The Dongguan Rail Transit station at Dongguan railway station

Preceding station	China Railway	Following station
Shipai towards Guangzhou	Guangzhou–Shenzhen railway	Changping towards Shenzhen
Preceding station	Dongguan Rail Transit	Following station
Chashan towards Humen Railway Station	Line 2	Terminus
