= Humen railway station =

Railway and metro station in Dongguan, China

Humen 虎门
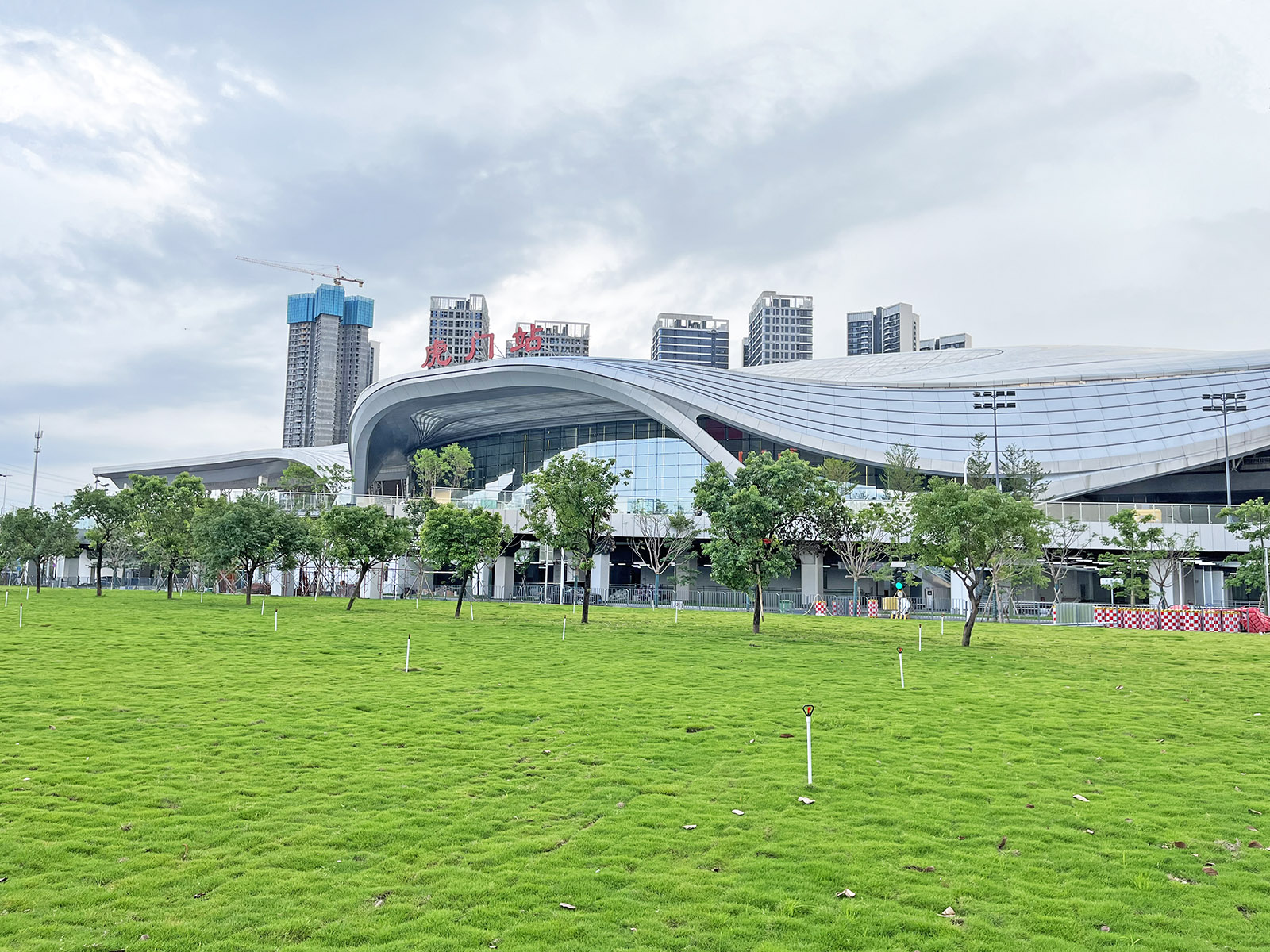

General information
- Location: Dongguan, Guangdong; China
- Coordinates: 22.8603°N 113.6731°E
- Operated by: Dongguan Rail Transit Corporation, Limited; CR Guangzhou
- Lines: Guangshen'gang XRL; Line 2

Other information
- Station code: Telegraph code: IUQ; Pinyin code: HME; Metro: 215
- Classification: 2nd class station

History
- Opened: 26 December 2011; 13 years ago (Guangshen'gang XRL); 27 May 2016; 9 years ago (Dongguan Rail Transit)
Location

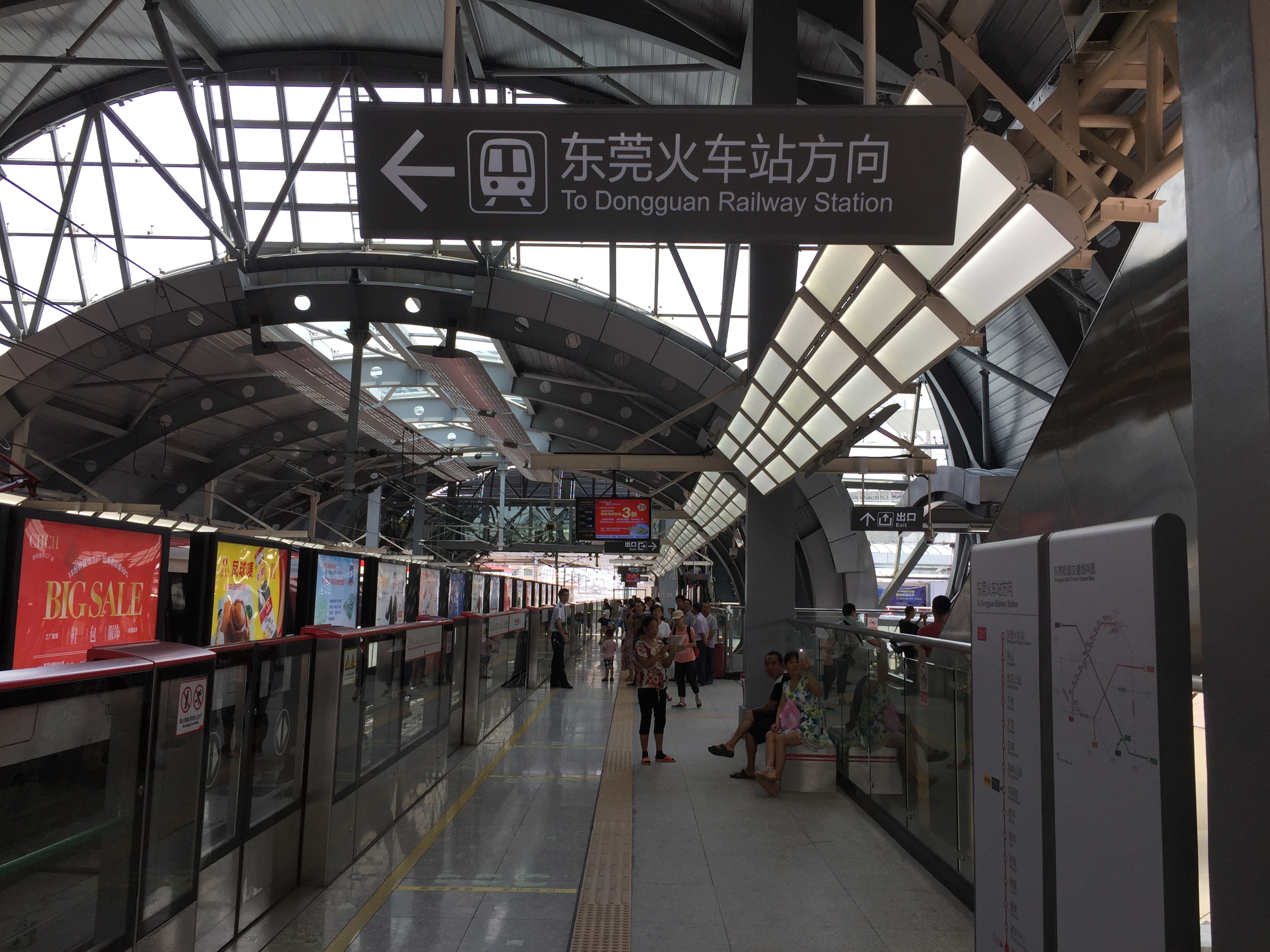
The Dongguan Rail Transit station at Humen railway station

Humen railway station (Chinese: 虎门站) is a station in Baisha Village (Chinese: 白沙村), Humen, Dongguan City, Guangdong Province, China. It is one of the stations on the Guangzhou–Shenzhen–Hong Kong Express Rail Link between Guangzhou South railway station in the Panyu District and Futian railway station in Shenzhen City.

Humen railway station is connected to Dongchong Town in the Panyu District by the 10.8 kilometres (6.7 mi) long Shiziyang Tunnel under the Shiziyang Channel near the estuary of the Pearl River. The tunnel was completed in March 2011.

== See also ==
- Guangzhou–Shenzhen–Hong Kong Express Rail Link

Preceding station	China Railway High-speed	Following station
Qingsheng towards Beijing West	Beijing–Guangzhou–Shenzhen–Hong Kong high-speed railway	Guangmingcheng towards Hong Kong West Kowloon
Preceding station	Dongguan Rail Transit	Following station
Terminus	Line 2	Exhibition Center towards Dongguan Railway Station
