= Dongguan Rail Transit =

Metro system of Dongguan, Guangdong, China

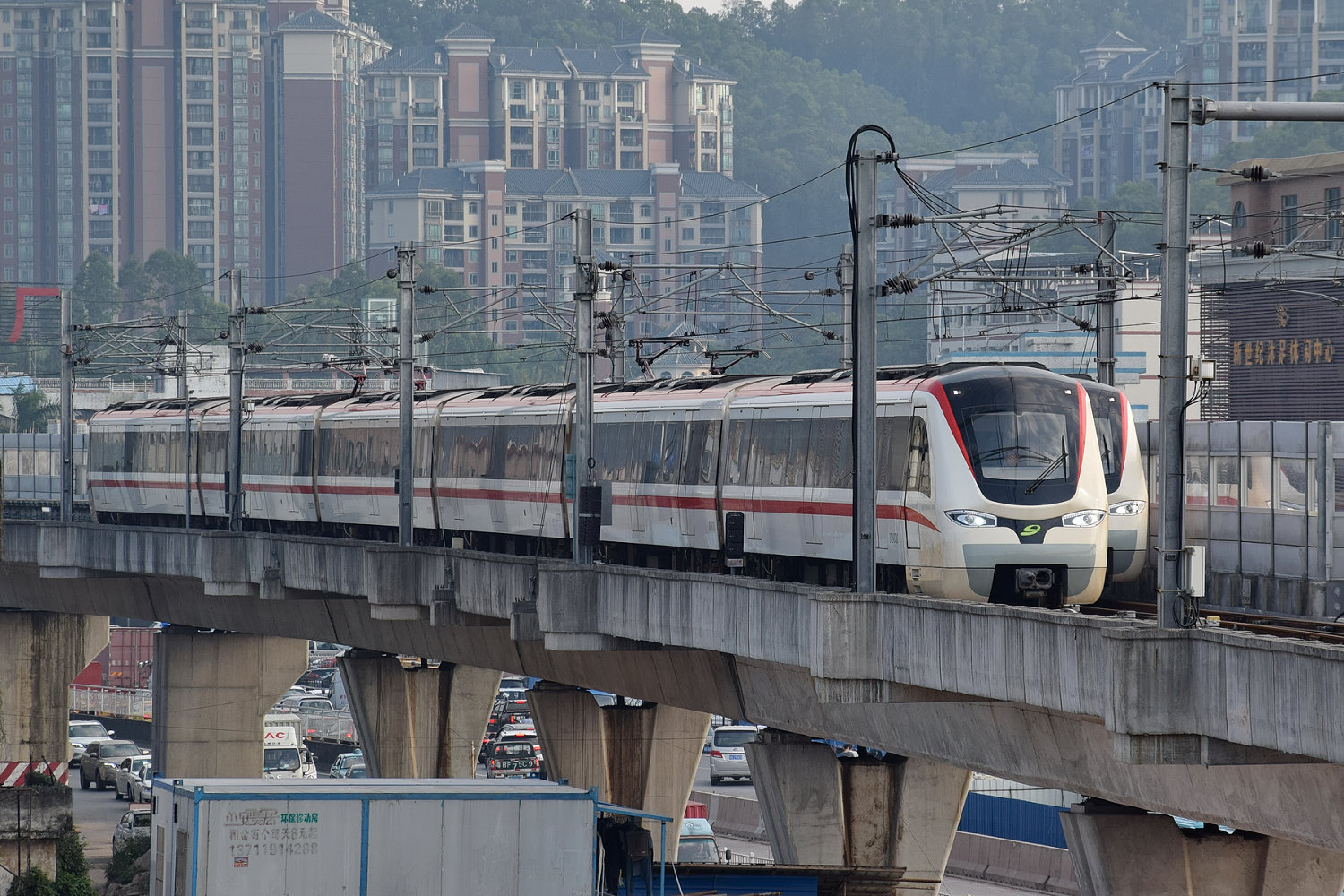
- A line 2 train at Humen Railway Station

Overview
- Locale: Dongguan, China
- Transit type: Rapid transit
- Number of lines: 2
- Number of stations: 39
- Website: www.dggdjt.com

Operation
- Began operation: 27 May 2016; 10 years ago
- Operators: Dongguan Rail Transit Corporation, Limited
- Rolling stock: 6-car Type B by CRRC Guangdong, CRRC Nanjing Puzhen and Bombardier Transportation

Technical
- System length: 95.2 km (59.2 mi) (operating)
- Track gauge: 1,435 mm (4 ft 8 1/2 in) standard gauge
- Electrification: 1,500 V DC from overhead catenary
System map

Dongguan Rail Transit
- Traditional Chinese: 東莞軌道交通
- Simplified Chinese: 东莞轨道交通
Transcriptions
Standard Mandarin
- Hanyu Pinyin: Dōngguǎn Guǐdào Jiāotōng
Yue: Cantonese
- Yale Romanization: Dūnggūn Gwáidouh Gāautūng
- Jyutping: Dung1gun1 Gwai2dou6 Gaau1tung1

Dongguan Rail Transit or Dongguan Metro is the rapid transit system of the city of Dongguan in Guangdong Province of China. It is operated by the state-owned Dongguan Rail Transit Corporation.

== History ==
The construction of the first section of Line 2 began on 26 March 2010, opening on 27 May 2016. Current plans call for some lines of the Dongguan Rail Transit to connect with the neighbouring Shenzhen Metro and Guangzhou Metro.

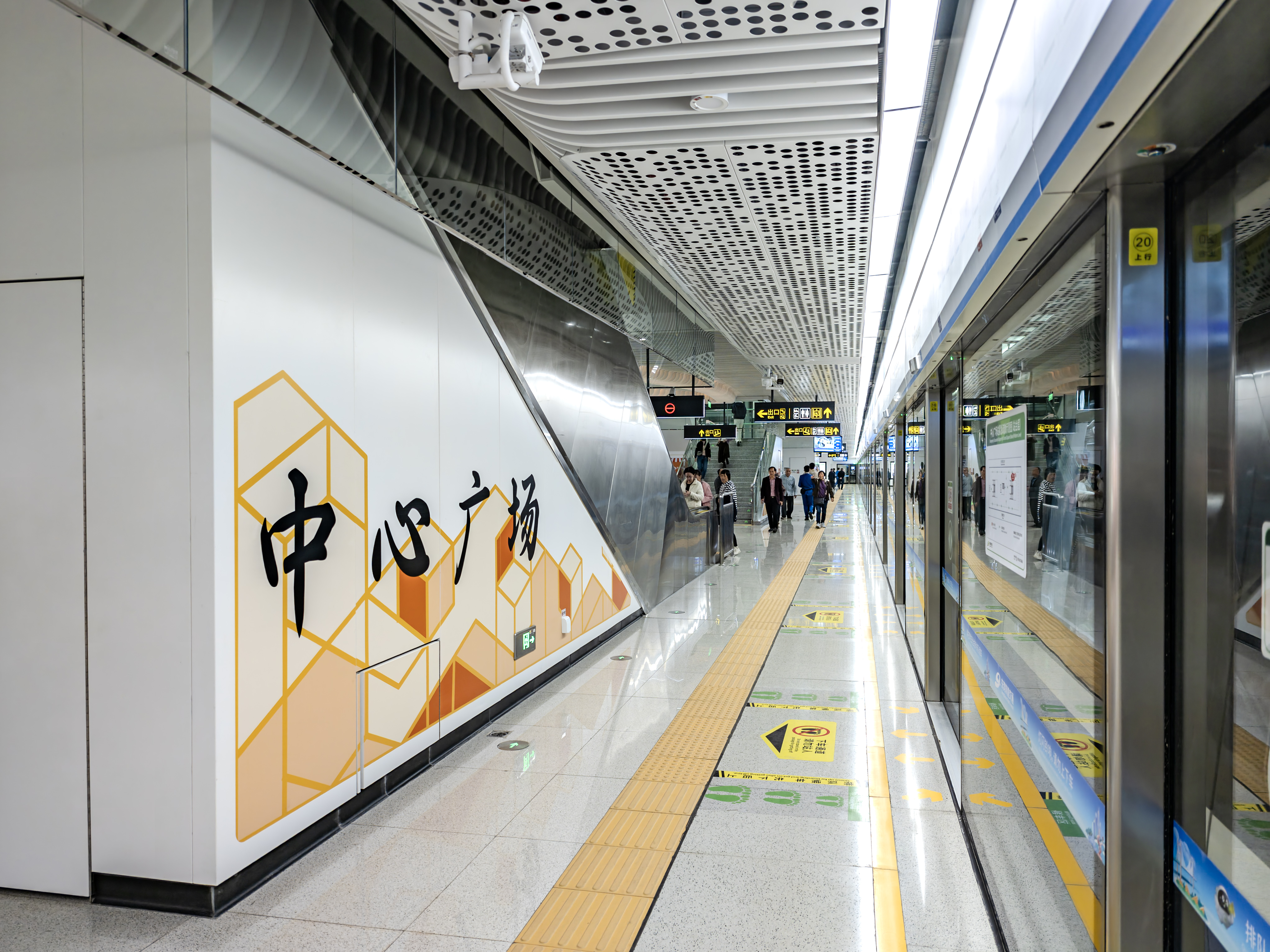
Central Square station, Line 1

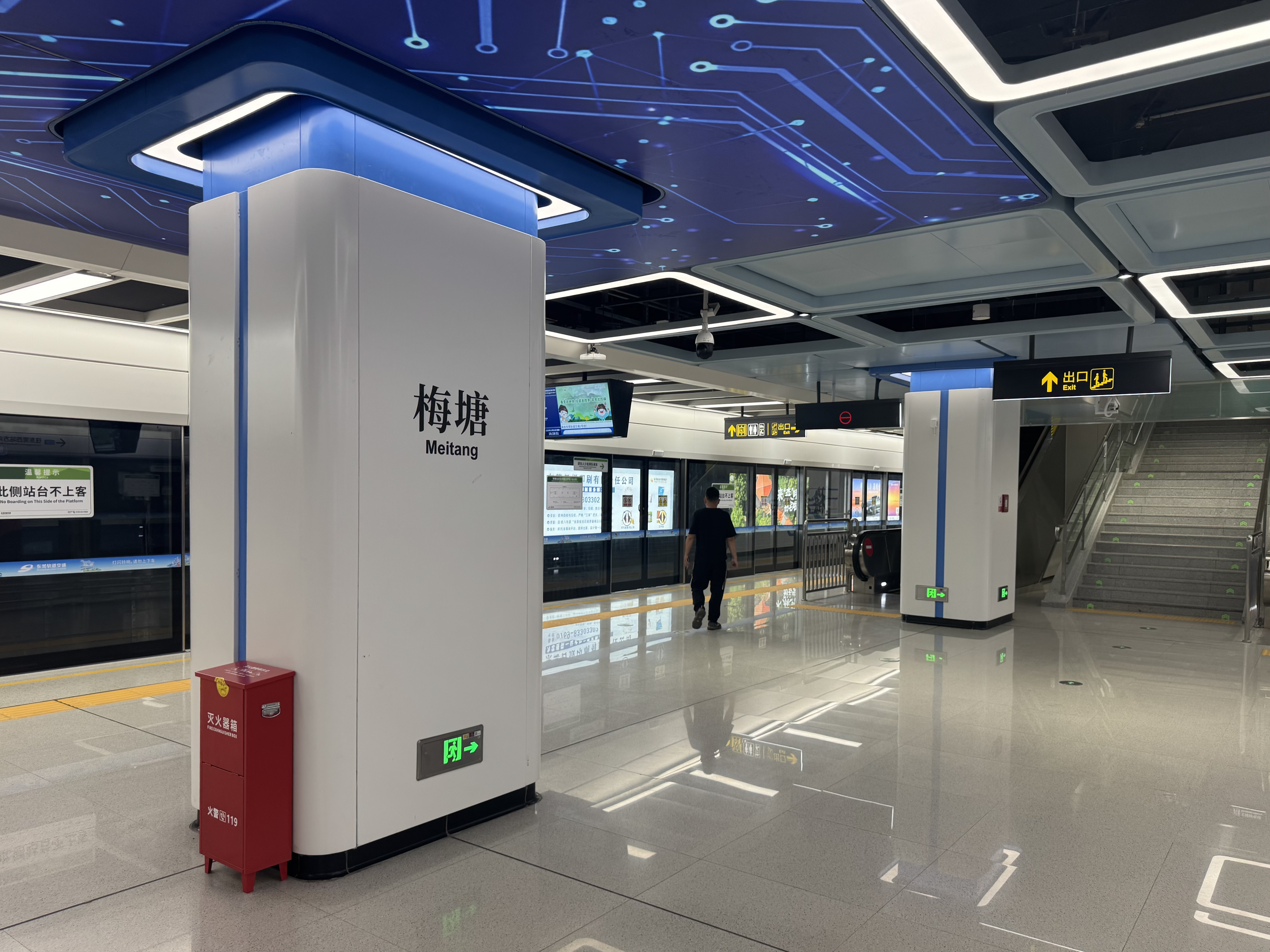
Meitang station, Line 1

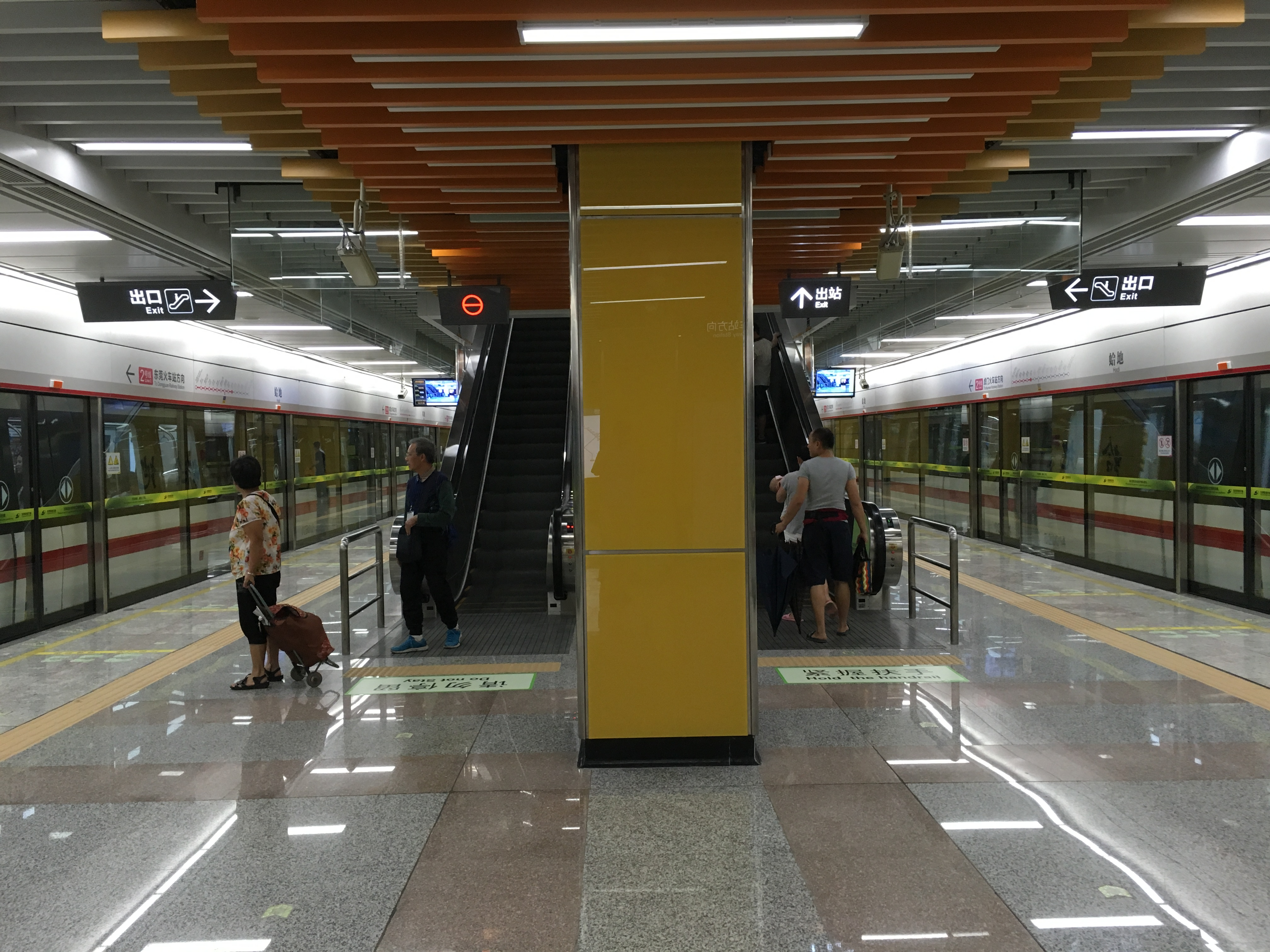
Gedi station, Line 2

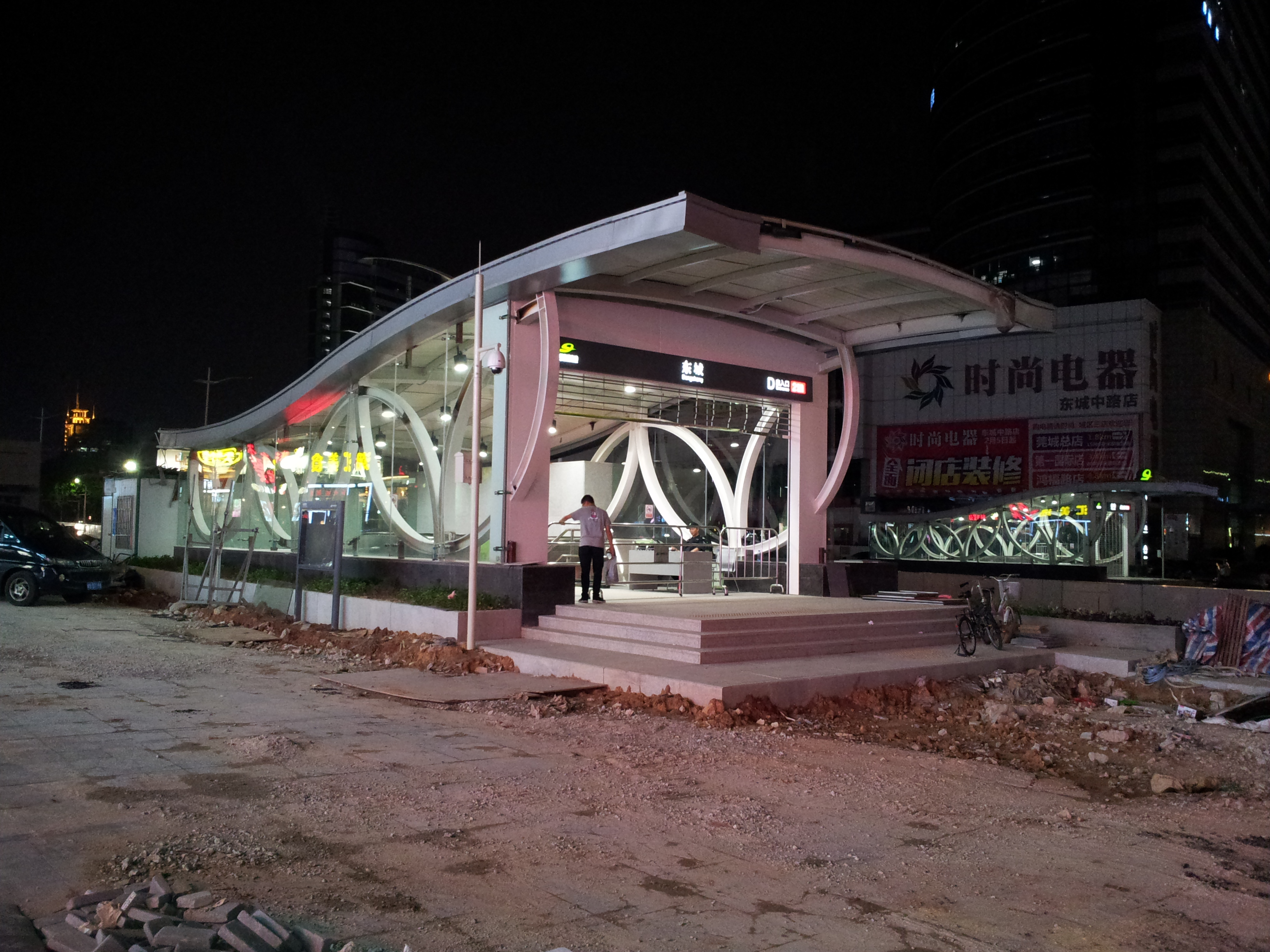
Dongcheng station, Line 2

== Lines in operation ==
System map of Dongguan Rail Transit

| Line | Terminals (Subdistrict/Town) | | Commencement | Newest Extension | Length km | Stations |
|---|---|---|---|---|---|---|
| 1 | Dongguanxi Railway Station (Wangniudun) | Meitang (Huangjiang) | November 28, 2025 | — | 57.5 | 25 |
| 2 | Humen Railway Station (Humen) | Dongguan Railway Station (Shilong) | May 27, 2016 | — | 37.7 | 15 |
| Total | | | | | 95.2 | 39 |

=== Line 1 ===
In 2015, the feasibility study, survey and design and other preliminary work of the Line 1 were being carried out. On February 19, 2019, Line 1 Phase 1 started construction. Line 1 has a total length of 57.478 kilometers and runs from northwest to southeast with 25 stations. The line opened on 28 November 2025.

=== Line 2 ===
The first section (15 stations and 37.743 km long) of Line 2 from Dongguan railway station in Shilong Town to Humen railway station in Humen Town opened on 27 May 2016.

== History ==
=== Preliminary planning ===
In 2001, when he was with the party secretary of Dongguan, Tong Xing used the slogan "a big year for five years to see Metro". The vision to build the Dongguan Rail Transit system was first put on the agenda.

From September 2003 to October 2004, China Academy of Urban Planning and Design Institute of Ministry of Railways, "Dongguan Rail Transit Network Planning" project was launched.

In November 2004, Dongguan City rail transit construction leading group was established, followed by the development of "Dongguan Rail Transit Network Plan" to be completed by 2020. Dongguan City plans to build a total length of 195 km, with the total number of stations to 55 of the rail network.

In September 2006, "Dongguan City Rapid Rail Transit Construction Plan" passed through the Provincial Development and Reform Commission.

In December 2006, plan submitted to the National Development and Reform Commission.

In February 2007, the mayor of Dongguan, Li Yuquan announced provincial government approval;

From September 25 to 26, 2006, "Dongguan city rapid rail transit construction plan" expert review meeting was held and the "Dongguan City Rapid Rail Transit Construction Plan" was approved. Experts recommended that the initial scale of the plan be brought down to about 60 km and give priority to the development of Line 2. Experts also note that the, at the time planned, Guangzhou–Shenzhen intercity railway overlaps with the proposed Line 1 and suggested further research to be made to allow for unified coordination and optimization of both lines. It was suggested that both lines should share tracks to avoid duplication and reduce investment. However, the proposal was rejected with Line 1 and Guangzhou-Shenzhen intercity railway built as separate lines.

In July 2009, "Dongguan city rapid rail transit construction plan (2009-2015)" was put to the NDRC and the Ministry of Construction for approval. Approval was granted to build Line 2 Phase I and II, totaling 37.8 km. City rail transit construction project formally entered operational phase.

To cope with the Pearl River Delta region intercity rail transit construction plan, in 2010 the planning was further adjusted to increase planned line length to 218 kilometres and 76 stations. Network construction period was extended to 2025.

In December 2013, with the consent of the State Council, the NDRC approved the short-term construction plan for urban rail transit in Dongguan (2013-2019). According to the approval, the newly-added construction lines approved by the state in Dongguan City are Line 1 Phase I, Line 2 Phase II and Line 3 Phase I, with a total length of 126.9 kilometers. The second phase of the project, a total of 164.6 kilometers of urban rail transit lines in Dongguan City, has been approved by the state.

=== Construction of Line 2 Phase I and II ===
On April 13, 2009, Dongguan railway station (formerly New Dasan Station) construction officially started, also the starting point of the Metro Line. The subway station hall project to be constructed simultaneously.

On March 26, 2010, Dongguan Metro Line 1 Phase 1 officially started.

On December 8, 2014, the two shield tunnel borers break through to Shanmei ~ Exhibition Centre, marking the second line main project completion. According to the plan, completion for trial operations is to be December 29, 2015. Line 2 opened on 27 May 2016.

=== Further planning ===
In 2019, the Dongguan Municipal Development and Reform Bureau issued the "Adjustment of the Construction and Planning of the Second Phase of Dongguan Urban Rail Transit (2019-2024), that is, the Planning of the Line Network (Adjustment)", adding Line 1 Phase II and III as well as branches to Line 1 and 3.

In March 2022, the National Development and Reform Commission approved the second phase construction planning adjustment plan, in which the first phase of Line 1 and Line 3 were optimized and adjusted, and the planning period was adjusted to 2022-2027.

== Future development ==
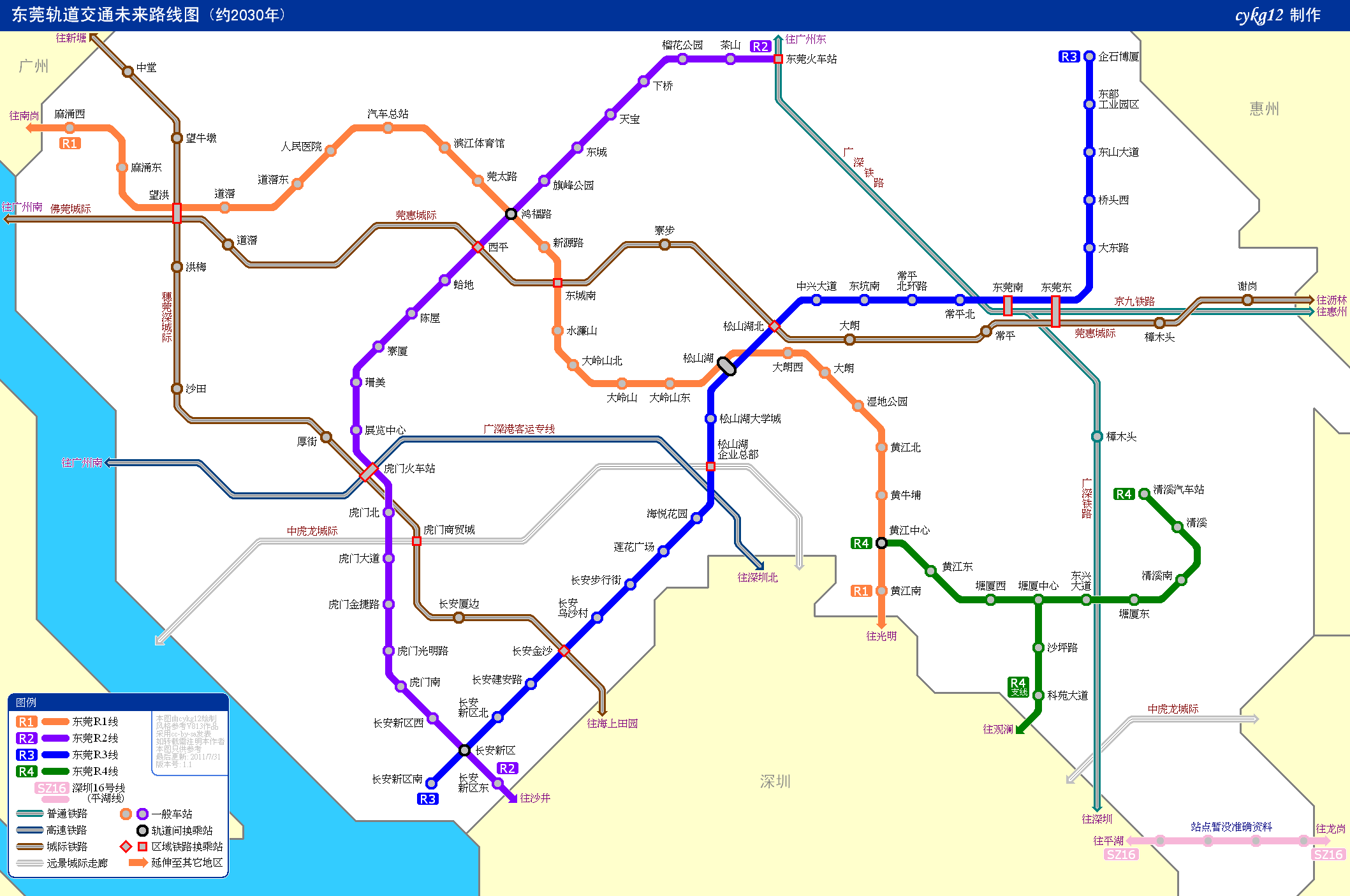
Early planning of Lines 1–4

=== Line 2 Phase III South Extension ===
On August 26, 2022, the groundbreaking ceremony for the south extension of Dongguan Rail Transit Line 2 was held in Humen Town. The extension is 17.1 km long with 9 station and will directly serve Humen Town Center after its opening planned for 2027.

=== Line 3 ===
Line 3 feasibility study, survey, design and other preliminary work has begun.

== Rolling stock ==
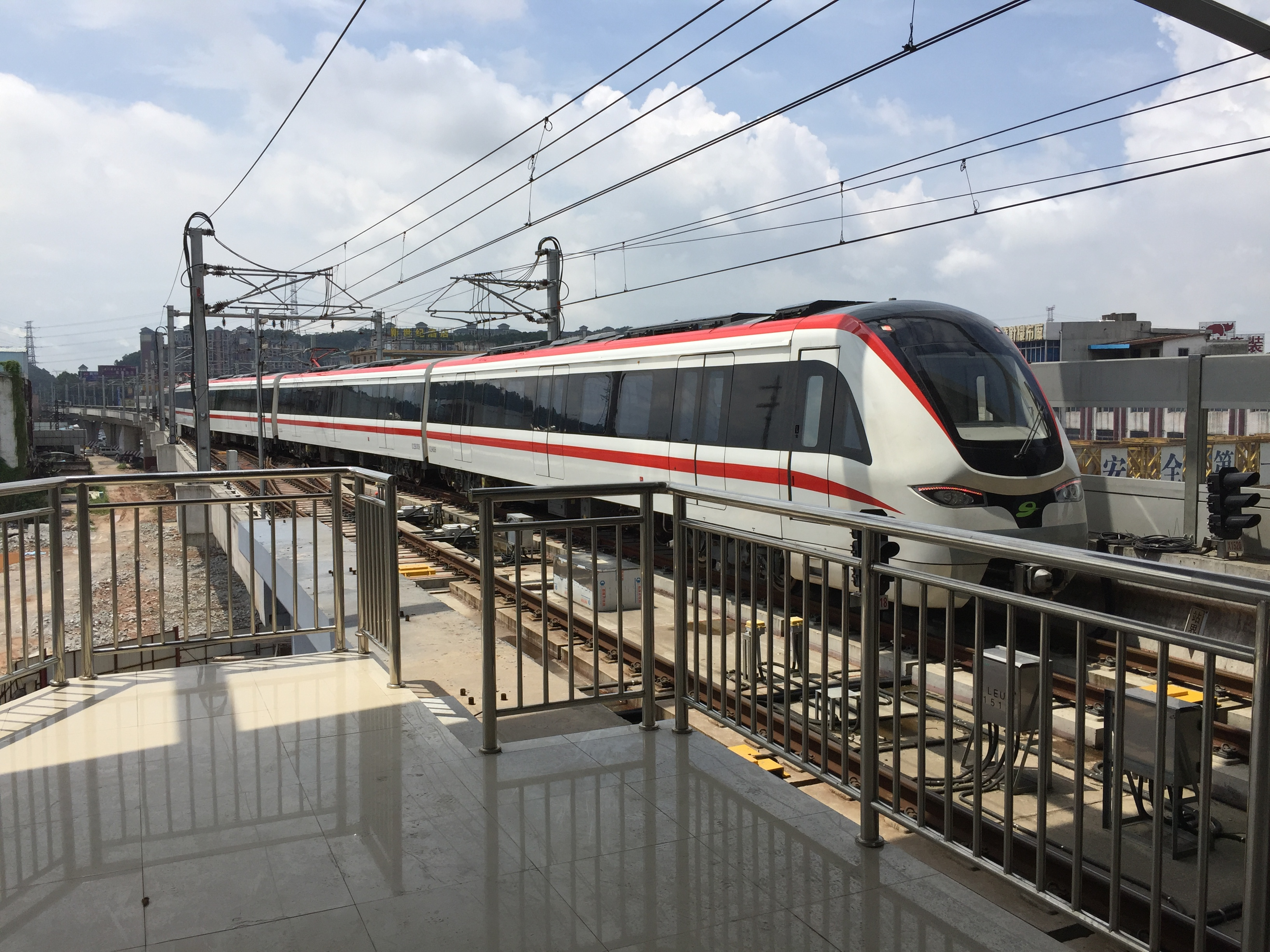
CIVAS train

CRRC Guangdong, CRRC Nanjing Puzhen and Bombardier Transportation is supplying 6-car CIVAS metro trains for Dongguan. The first trains were built in Västerås, Sweden with the final assembly in Changzhou.

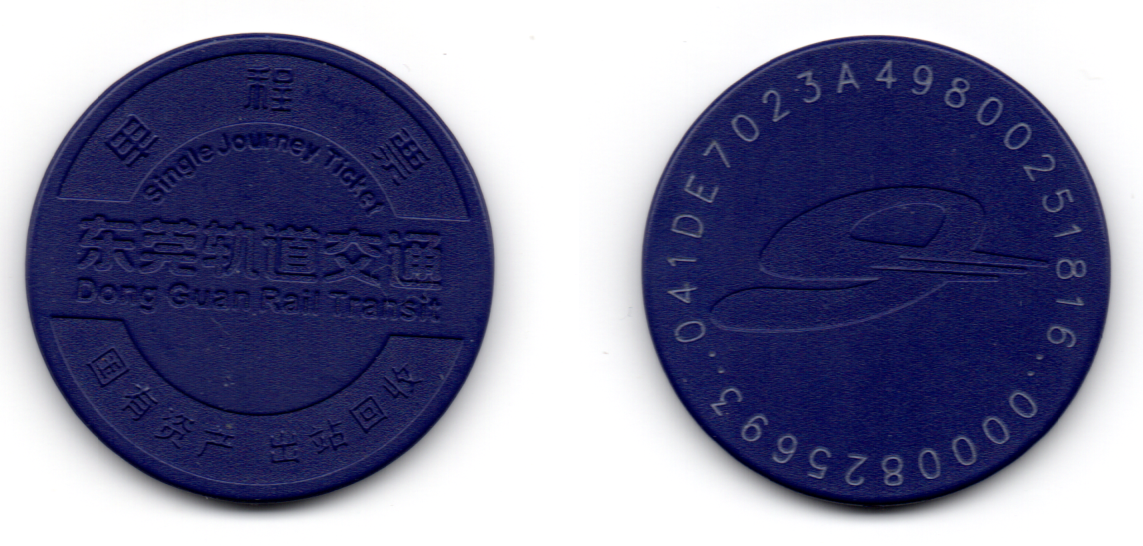
Single journey ticket (token)

== List of planned lines ==
- Line 3
- Line 4

== See also ==
- Guangzhou Metro
- Foshan Metro (FMetro)
- Shenzhen Metro
- List of metro systems
- Urban rail transit in China
