= Lingnan garden =

Chinese garden style

Lingnan garden (Cantonese Jyutping: Ling^{5} naam^{4} jyun^{4} lam^{4}; Traditional Chinese: 嶺南園林), also called Cantonese garden, is a style of garden design native to Lingnan – the traditionally Cantonese provinces of Guangdong and Guangxi in southern China. It is one of the major styles of Chinese garden, along with the Jiangnan garden (e.g., the Classical Gardens of Suzhou) and Sichuanese garden.

The Lingnan region lies to the south of the Nanling Mountains, spanning southern Fujian, Guangdong, and Guangxi. The extensive river network, strong sunlight, and regular monsoon in the region contributes to a lush subtropical natural landscape. With this rich natural scenery, people in Lingnan have been able to create a rich and colorful style of traditional garden distinct from gardens in other Han Chinese regions.

== Classification ==
=== By types ===
Lingnan garden consists of several substyles, such as royal gardens, private gardens, and public gardens. A good example of royal Lingnan garden is Guangzhou's Gauyiu Garden (Jyutping: Gau^{2} jiu^{6} jyun^{4}; Traditional Chinese: 九曜園, literally "garden of nine glories"), built by Lau Yan, the first king of the Southern Han dynasty. Built in the style of the Five Dynasties and Ten Kingdoms period (10th century), it laid down the foundation of modern Lingnan style and is one of the more well-preserved gardens from that period. Prominent examples of private Lingnan gardens include the "four great gardens of central Guangdong": Yuyum Sanfong, Leung's Garden, Ching Fai Garden, and Ho Garden. Among them, Yuyum Sanfong is considered the best example of classical Lingnan garden, having used features such as lintels with stone carvings, mock mountains made of stone heaps, geometric pool shapes, and massive use of wood carvings.

Gauyiu Garden
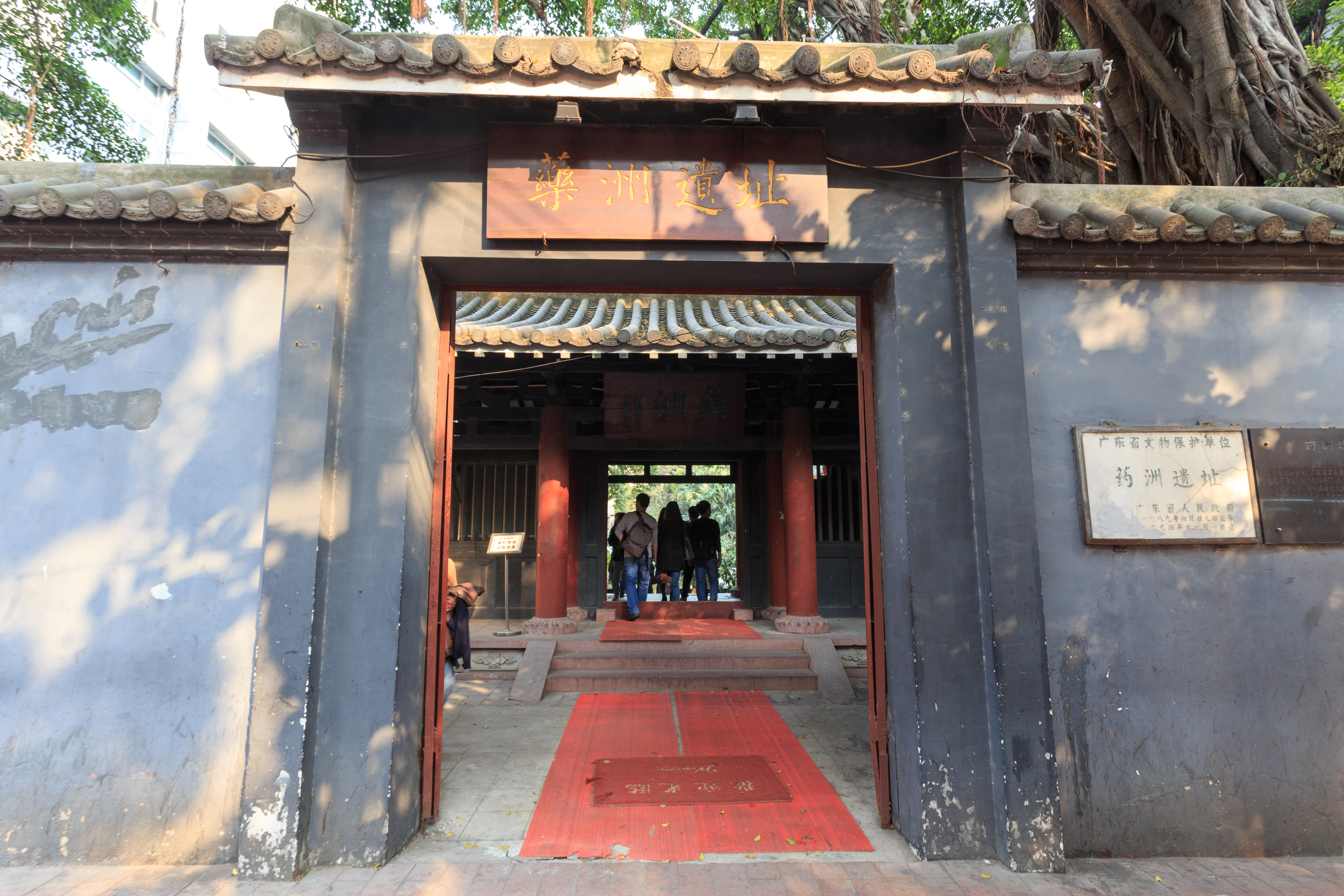

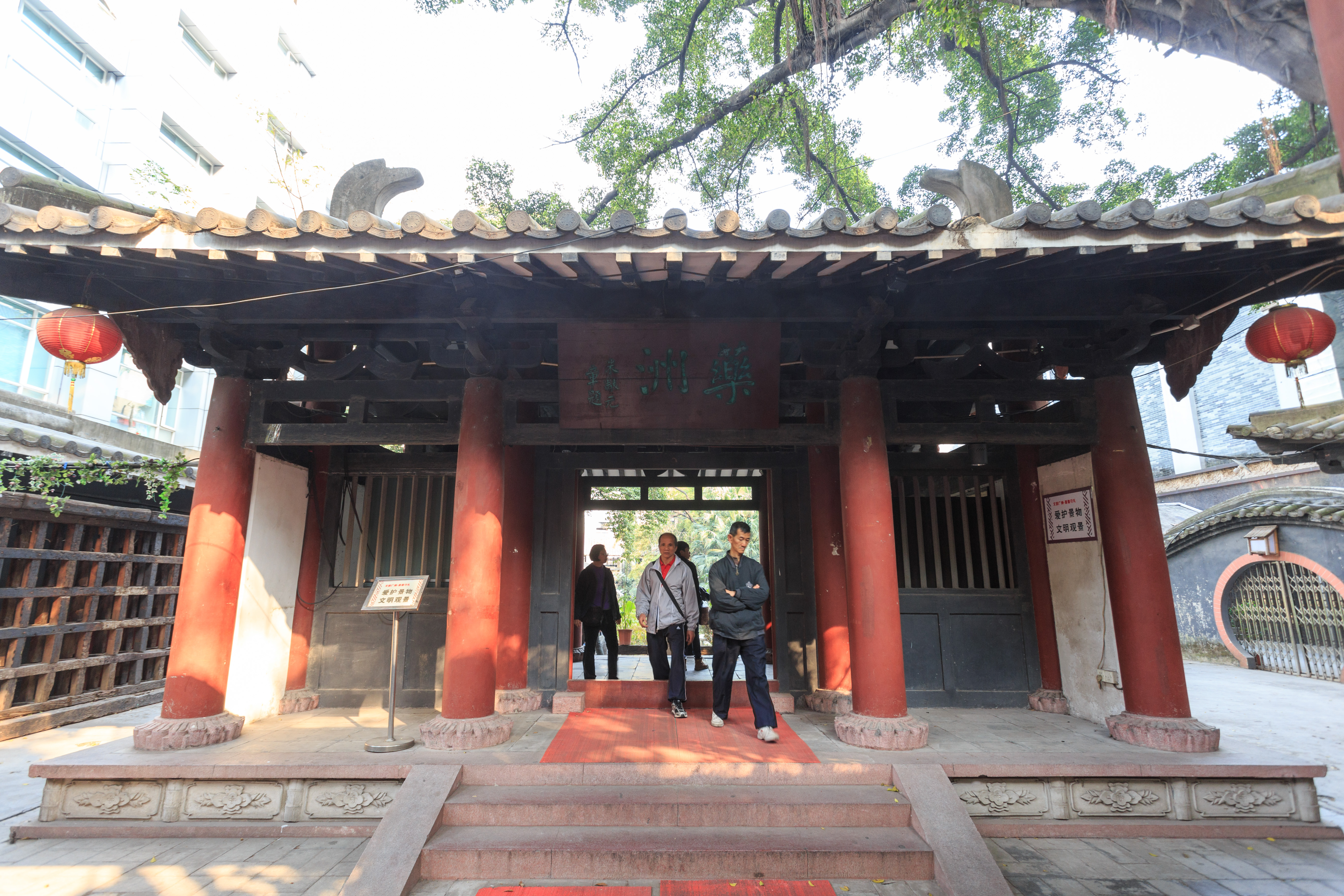

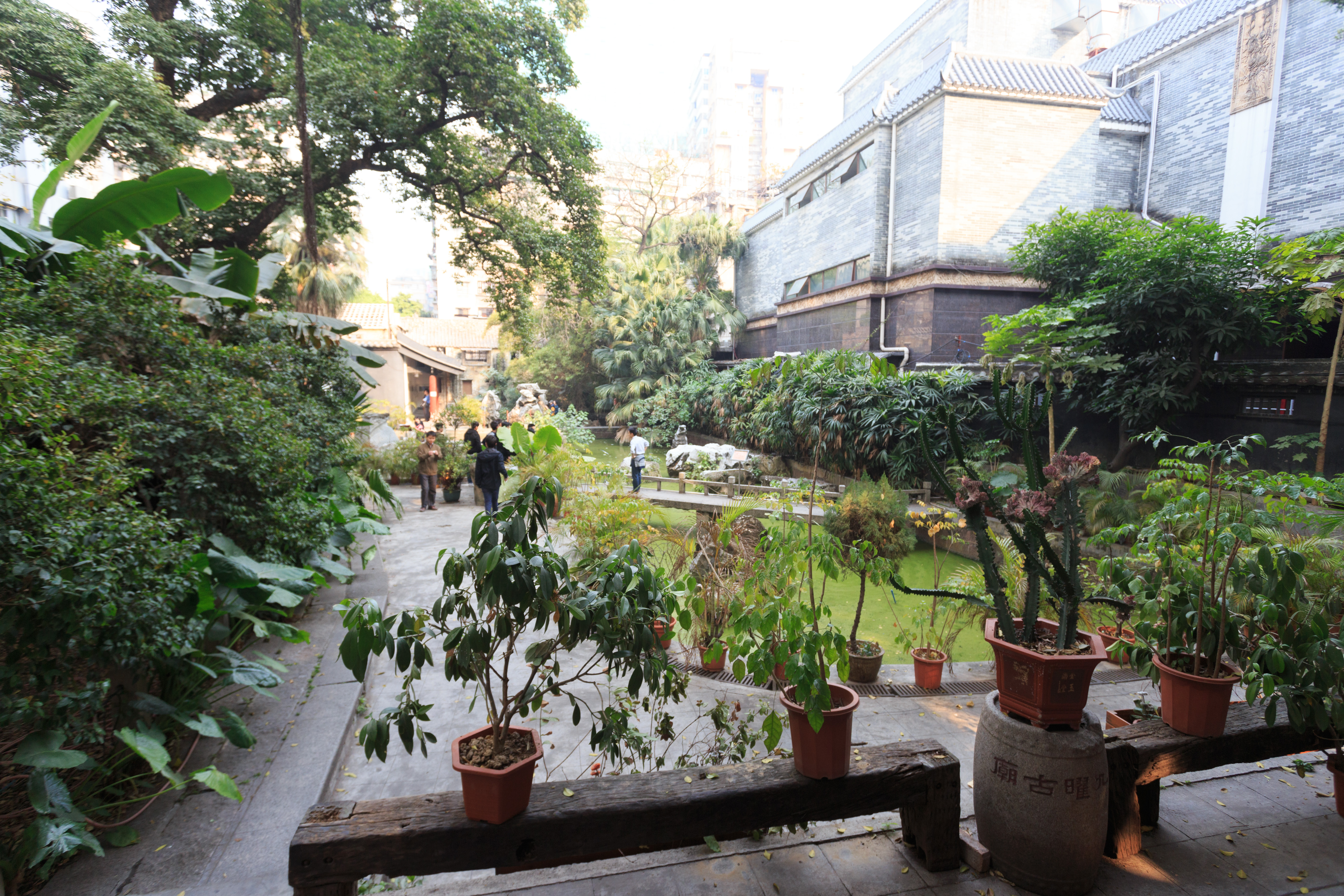
Private Lingnan gardens
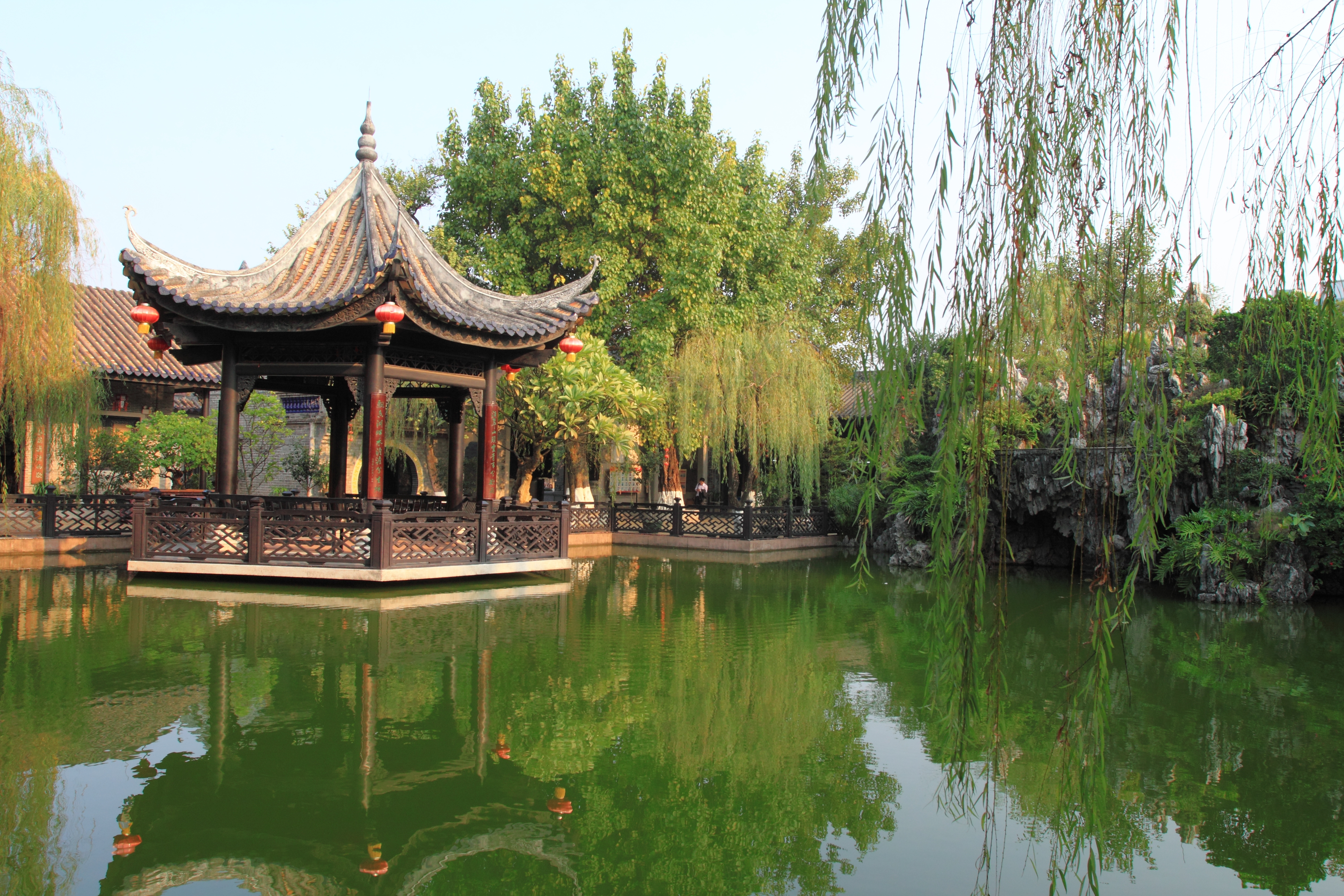
Yuyum Sanfong ("Yuyin Shanfang" in Mandarin Chinese) in Panyu, Guangzhou, is commonly cited as a representative example of Lingnan garden.

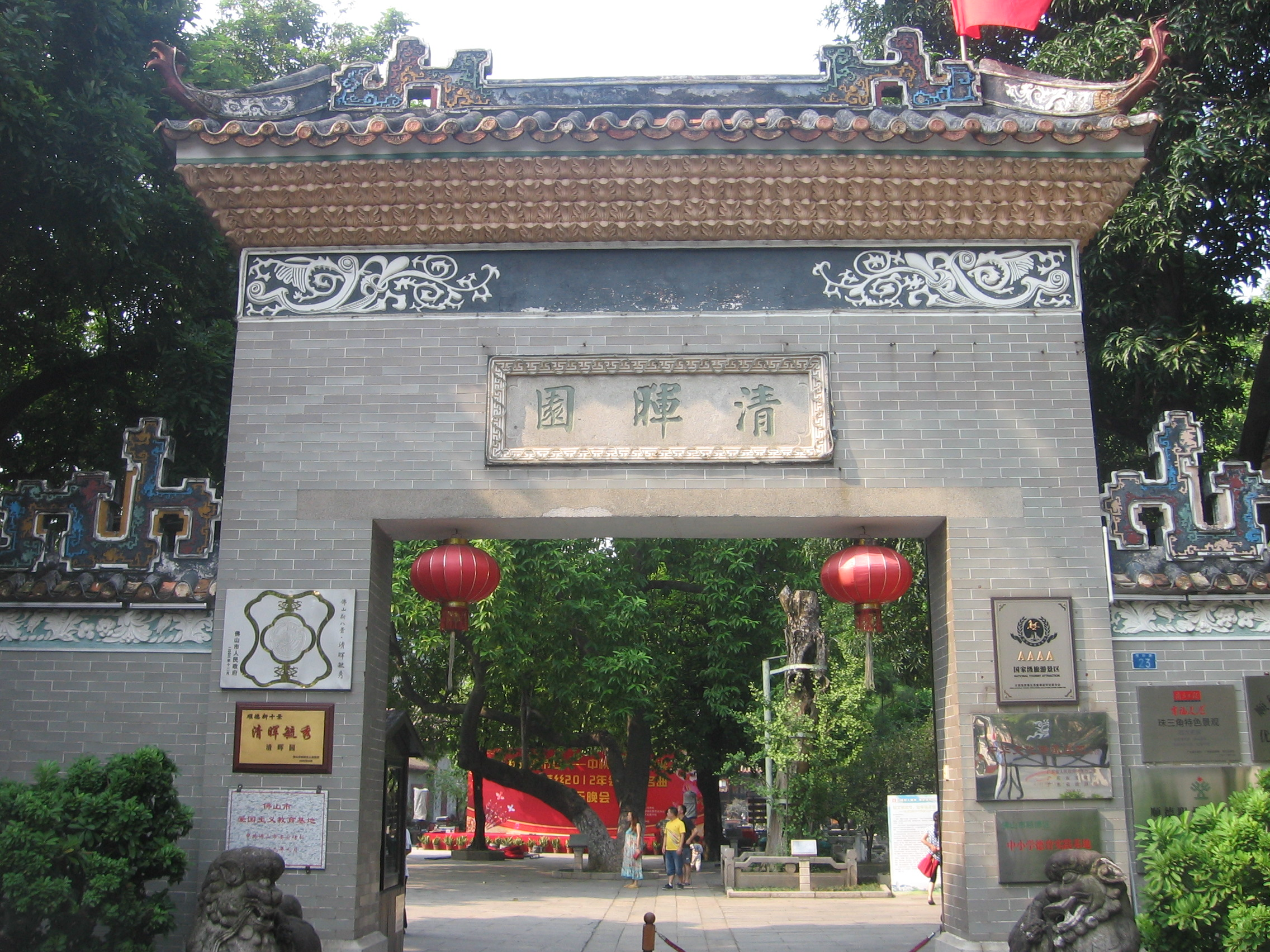
Ching Fai Garden in Shunde.

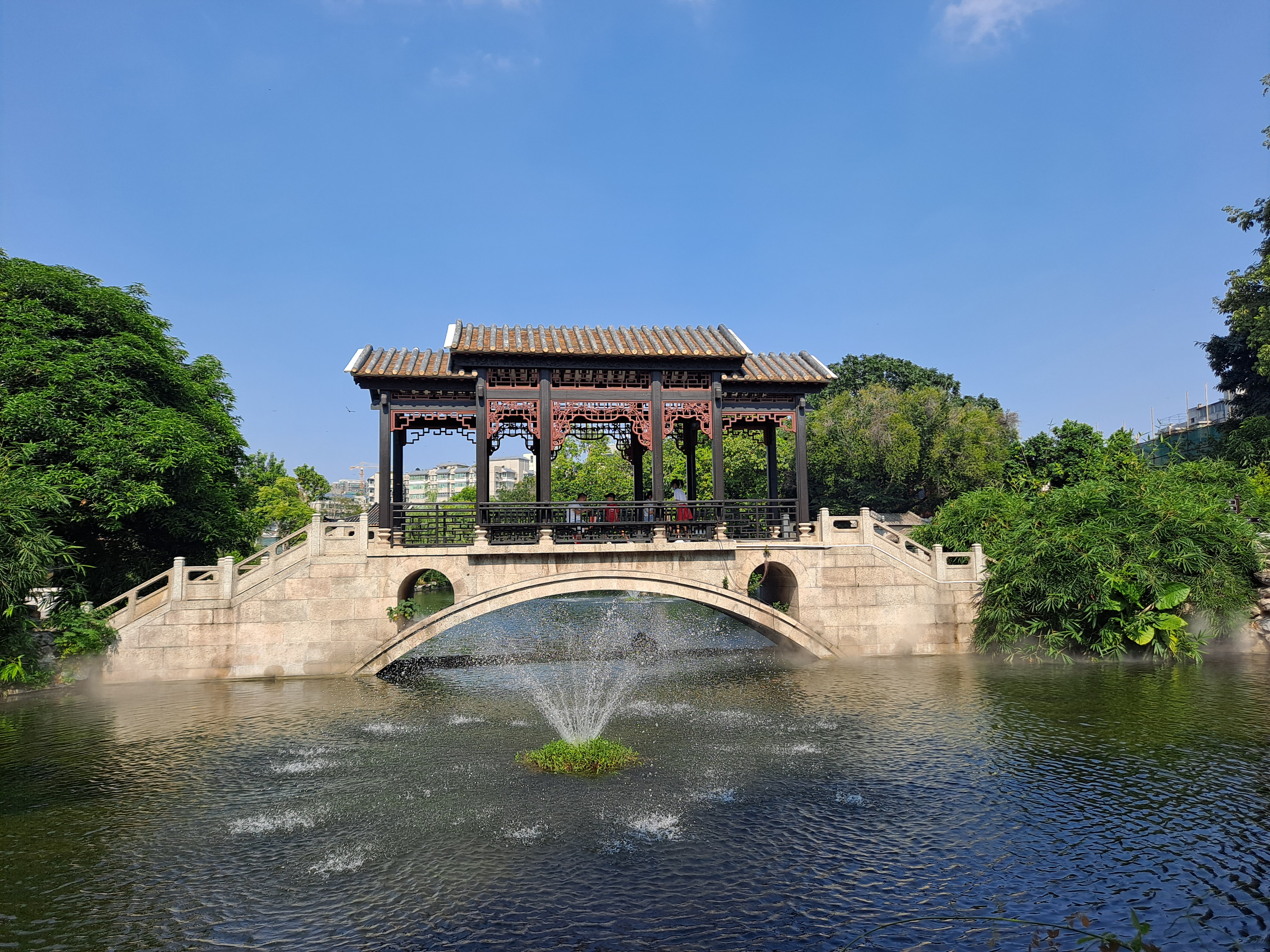
Leung's Garden in Foshan.

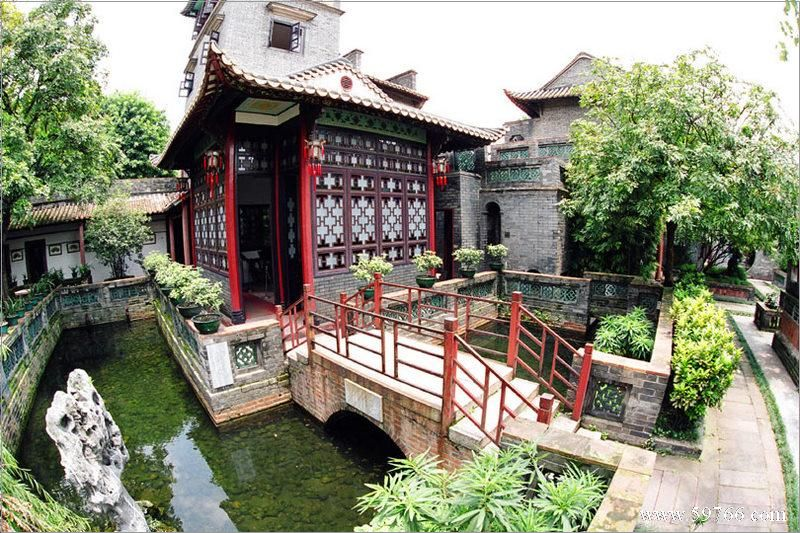
Ho Garden in Dongguan.

=== By regions ===
Guangdong's gardens have been the mainstream of Lingnan gardens. They have been noted for their inclusion of stone heaps as mock mountains, slowly rising roofs and alleys, various sculptures and carvings, contrasting colors of blue and green, and plants that bloom in all four seasons. Guangxi's gardens tend to be based more on natural landscapes, manifested in stone cliffs and engraved walls.

== Characteristics ==
Overall, the most commonly discussed characteristics of Lingnan garden include:

=== Layout ===
Lingnan garden primarily utilizes courtyard layout. The use of courtyard is a prominent trait of Lingnan garden, whose smallness and fineness are said to be comparable with those of classical Japanese garden. The vast majority of private Lingnan gardens use courtyard layout.

=== Elements ===
==== Artificial mountains ====
When it comes to artificial mountains (Jyutping: Gaa^{2} saan^{1}; Traditional Chinese: 假山), Lingnan garden utilizes (1) cliffs; (2) islands; (3) artificial reefs; and (4) heaps. This style rarely uses mud to build artificial mountains.

==== Water ====
Lingnan garden is said to be heavily based around control of water, involving waterways of various patterns: (1) "cliff-waterfall-depth" pattern; (2) lake pattern; (3) depth without waterfall; (4) curving waterways; and (5) wellspring.

==== Stones ====
Lingnan garden uses a different set of stones from those used by Jiangnan and Northern Chinese gardens. It utilizes local minerals such as Minnan granite, Hainan coral stone, and Taiwan Guru stone. Gardens of this style prefer not to stack up its stones, but instead have them spread outward horizontally, with various methods and patterns of outward spreading.

=== Architecture ===
Lingnan garden uses towers, bridges, and corridors. This style either uses "high walls and cold lanes" to divide a garden into a combination of multiple courtyards, or simply connect the buildings and the courtyards as one single whole. The architecture involves high pillars, wide corridors, and thick walls. "Three carvings and three sculpting" (Jyutping: Saam^{1} diu^{1} saam^{1} sou^{3}; Traditional Chinese: 三雕三塑) – carvings made of wood, brick and stone, and sculptures made of clay, mud, and granite – are prevalent. Classical Lingnan gardens utilize full gardens of three carvings and three sculpting, as shown in Bou Mak Garden (Jyutping: Bou^{2} mak^{6} jyun^{4}; Traditional Chinese: 寶墨園, literally "Garden of Treasure and Ink") in Panyu. Buildings in Lingnan garden are typically constructed in classical Lingnan style.

Architecture of Lingnan gardens
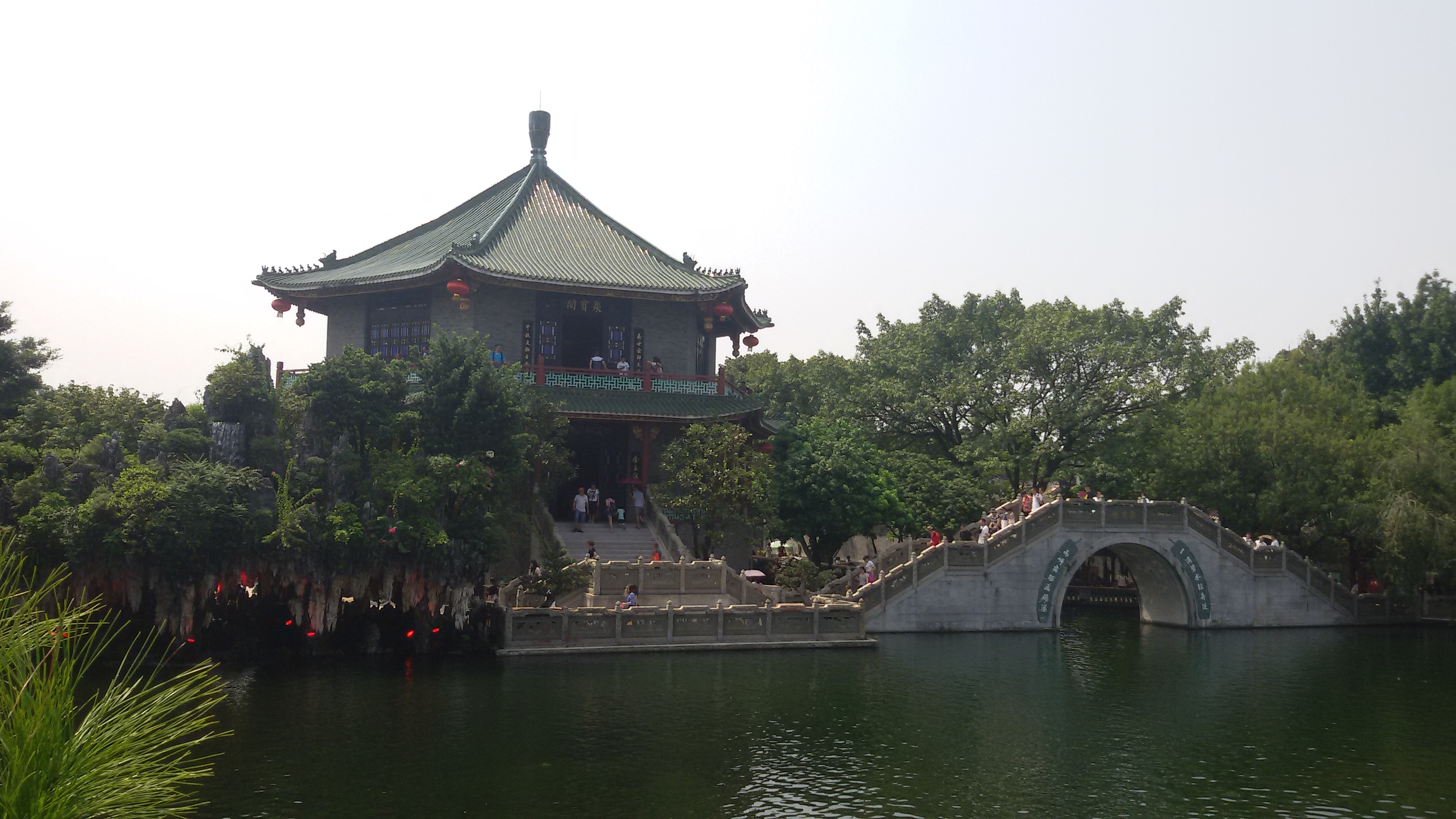
Bou Mak Garden.

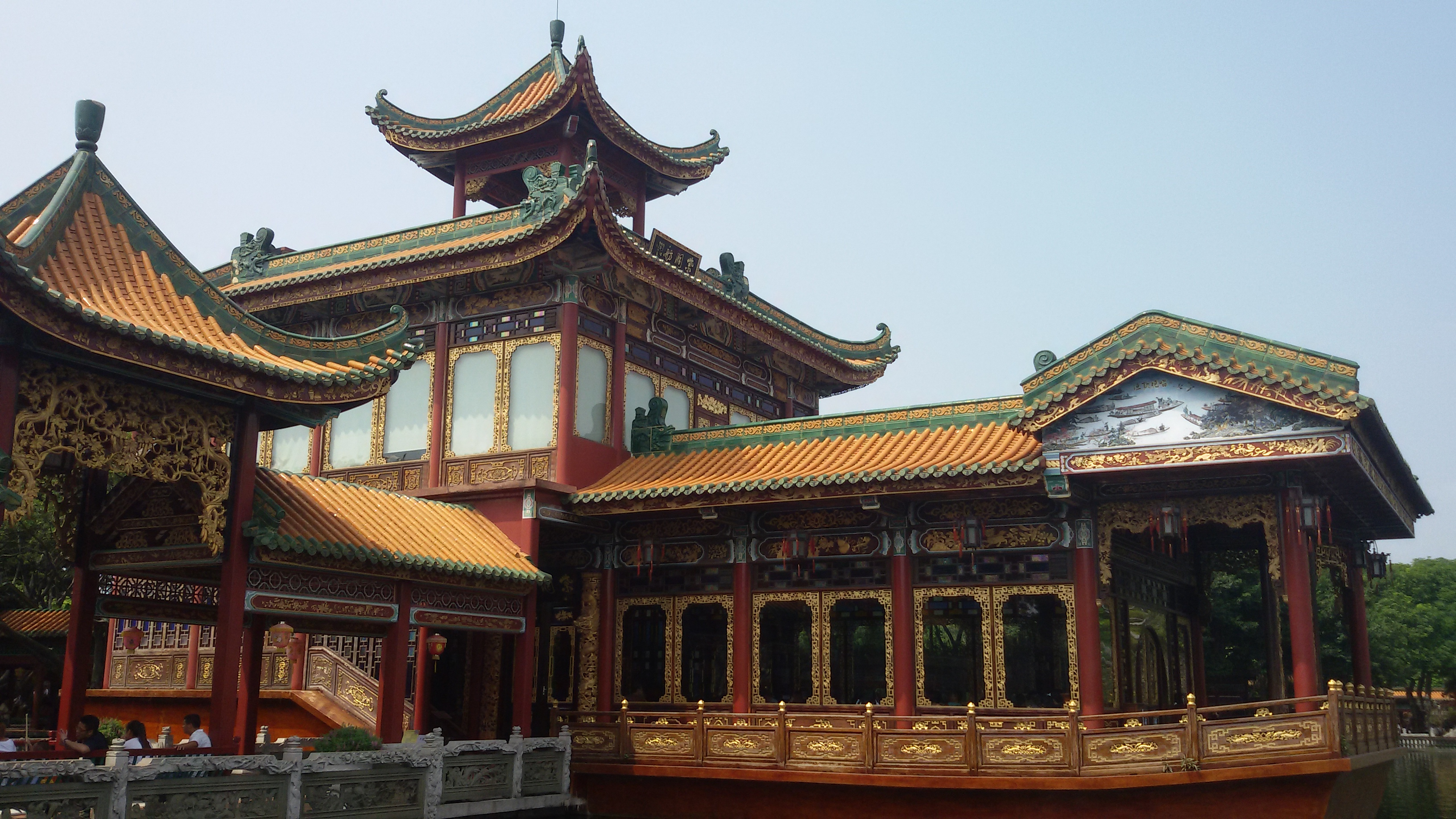
Bou Mak Garden uses a large amount of carvings.

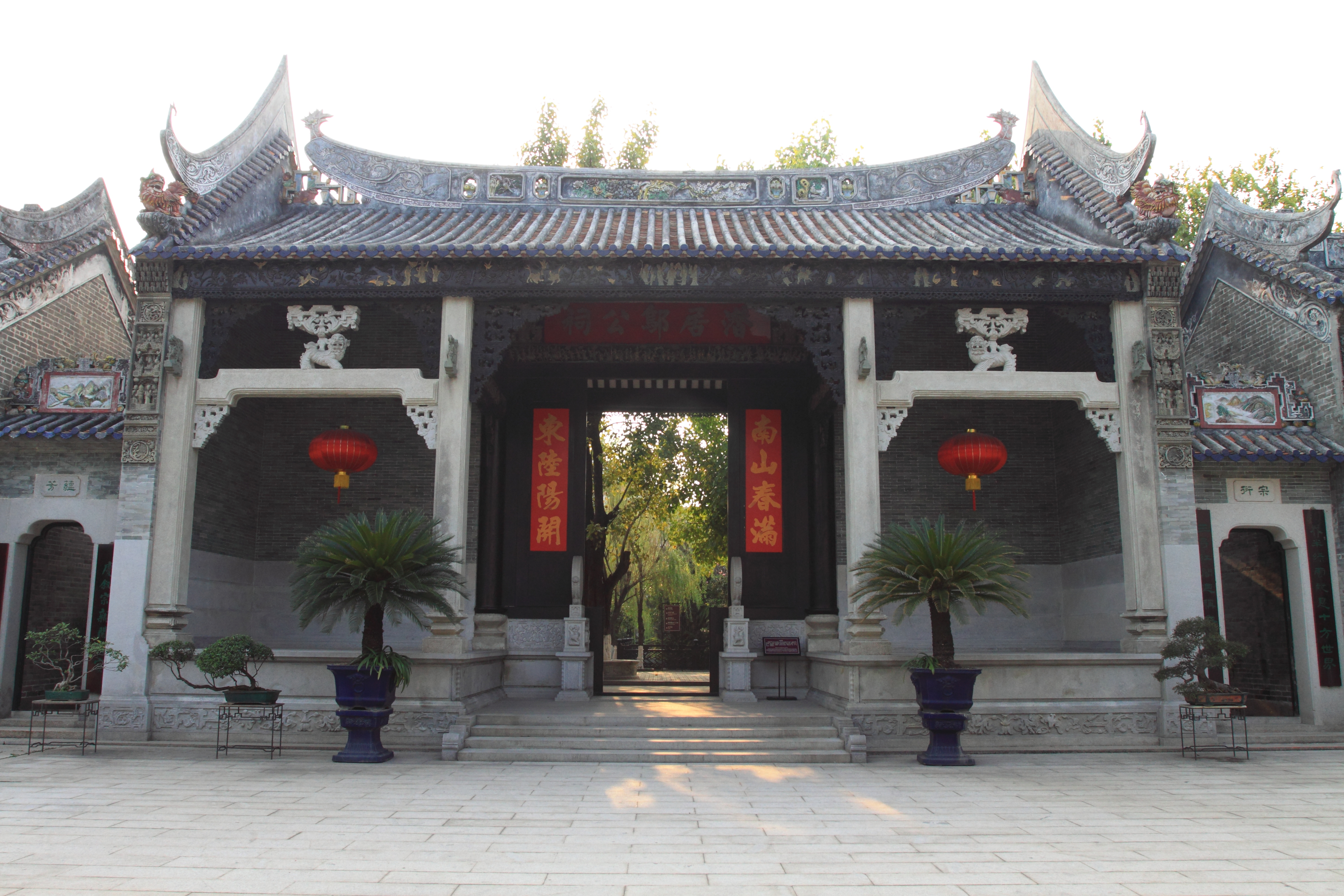
Yuyum Sanfong uses Lingnan architecture.

=== Calligraphy and paintings ===
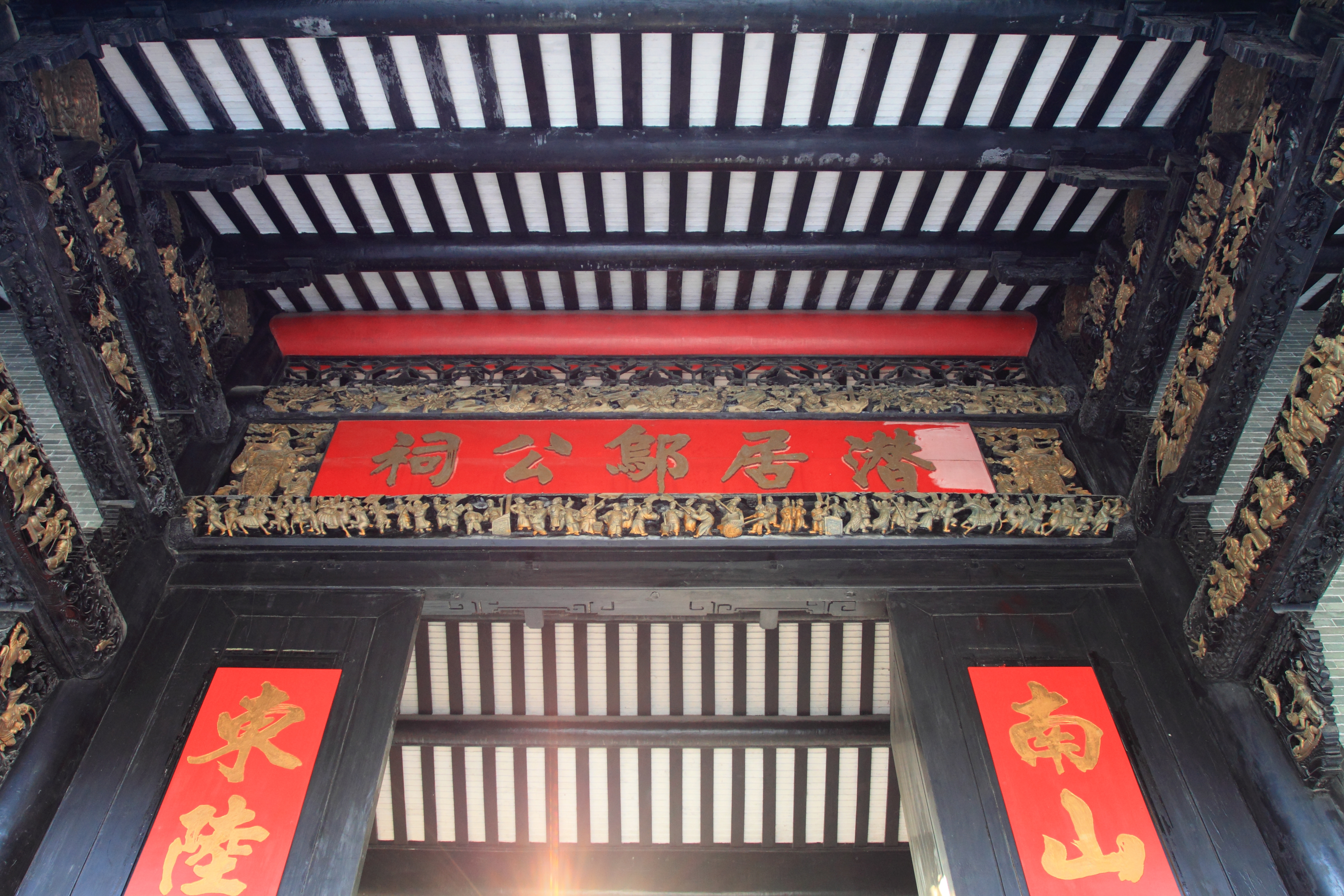
Yuyum Sanfong uses some calligraphy as decorations, alongside massive amount of carvings – the latter of which is typical of Cantonese gardens.

Classical Lingnan garden uses calligraphy and paintings only sparingly, and modern Lingnan garden is even less inclined to do so. There are, however, several notable instances of such in Lingnan garden design. Yuyum Sanfong, for instance, has the calligraphy "餘地三弓紅雨足，蔭天一角綠雲深" (Classical Chinese, literally "This land is just as large as three bows, but rich in red rain; Though it is just a corner under the sky, it is abundant with green clouds") written on its main door.

=== Plants ===
Vegetation in Lingnan garden is summarized with the sentence "all-season flowers, scenery of tropical rain belt". Lingnan gardens use native, mainly subtropical plant species such as palm trees (including coconut trees), flamevine, orchids, Chinese banyan, and Lychee trees.

== Philosophy ==
Lingnan garden is said to embody the philosophy behind Cantonese culture – commerce, pragmatism, and openness to foreign ideas. For much of the past millennium, Cantonese people have served as major merchants of the Chinese Empire, especially when it came to trade activities with Western Europeans and Southeast Asians. This results in a strong commercial tradition among Cantonese. This distinguishes them from other Han Chinese groups – such as the Northern groups, who have formed the empire's politicians and bureaucrats, or the Wuyue group, who have served prominently as scholars and artists. Cantonese gardens are less bounded by royal standards and frequently adopt foreign (i.e., non-Chinese) elements like stained glass. Also, Cantonese are far less heavily invested in Confucian philosophy, resulting in a style closer to the average people – such as a tendency to fuse gardens with buildings that have mundane purposes.

== Brief history ==
According to historical records, people in Lingnan were already building gardens during the reign of the Nanyue king Zhao Tuo (? – 137 BC) in Guangzhou. Their royal gardens took after the styles of the Qin Empire's. Afterwards, however, with the decline of the Nanyue regime, Lingnan royal gardens also disappeared. In much of the two millennia that followed, Lingnan had served as the fringe territory of various Chinese dynasties, resulting in a relative lack of royal garden styles. Nonetheless, the area around Guangzhou became an important port for these dynasties, resulting in a gradual rise of the social and economic importance of the region. This and frequent cultural exchanges with outside powers caused the development of a folk garden style – the classical Lingnan garden.

== Prominent Lingnan gardens ==
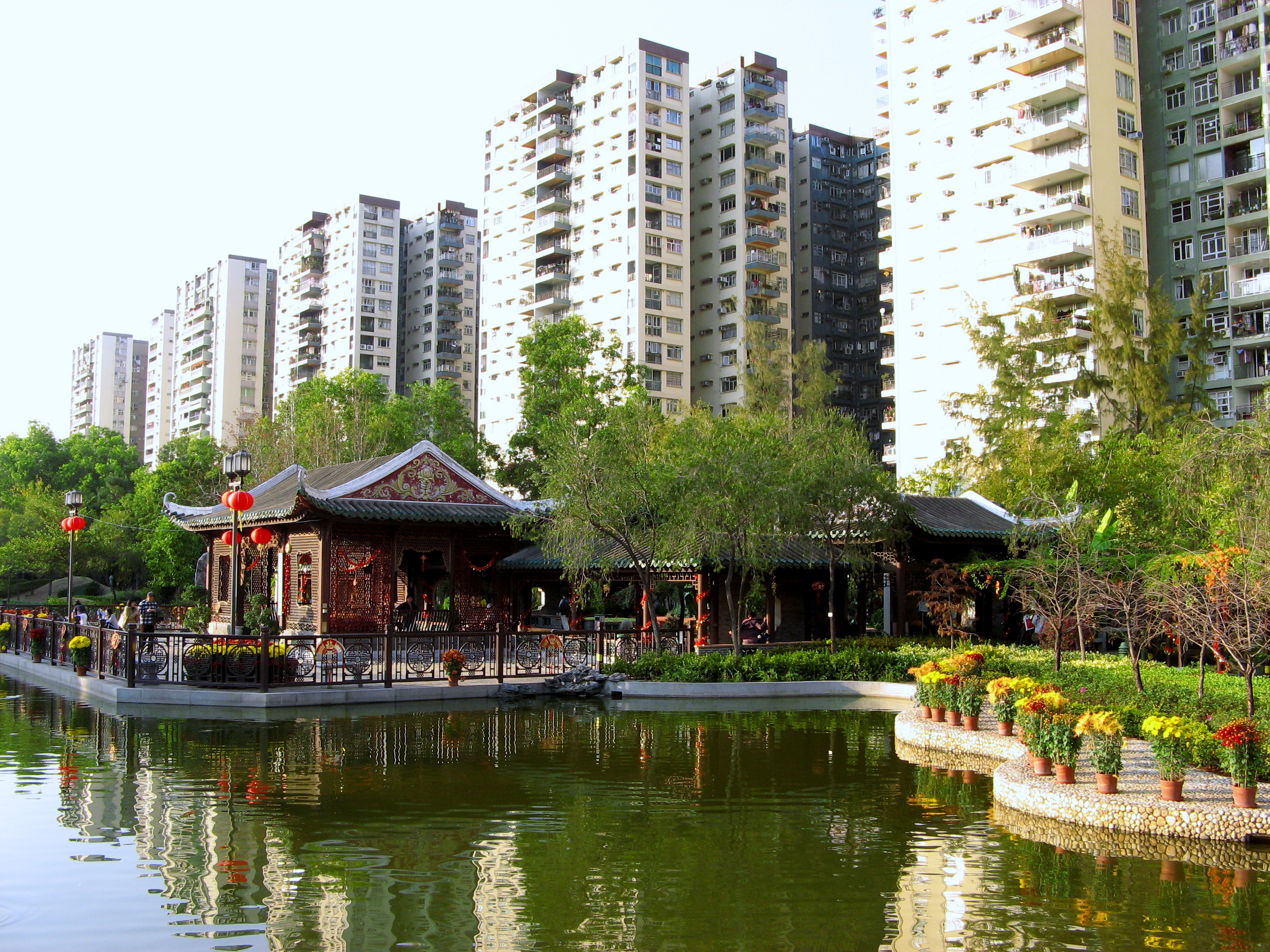
Hong Kong's Lai Chi Kok has an example of a Lingnan garden.

- Yuyum Sanfong
- Leung's Garden
- Ching Fai Garden
- Ho Garden
- Bou Mak Garden

== See also ==
- Cantonese culture
- Cantonese penjing
- Sichuanese garden
- Japanese garden
- Korean garden
- Chinese garden
