= Nanyue Yuan =

Garden in Guangzhou, China

- 南粤苑 (Chinese)
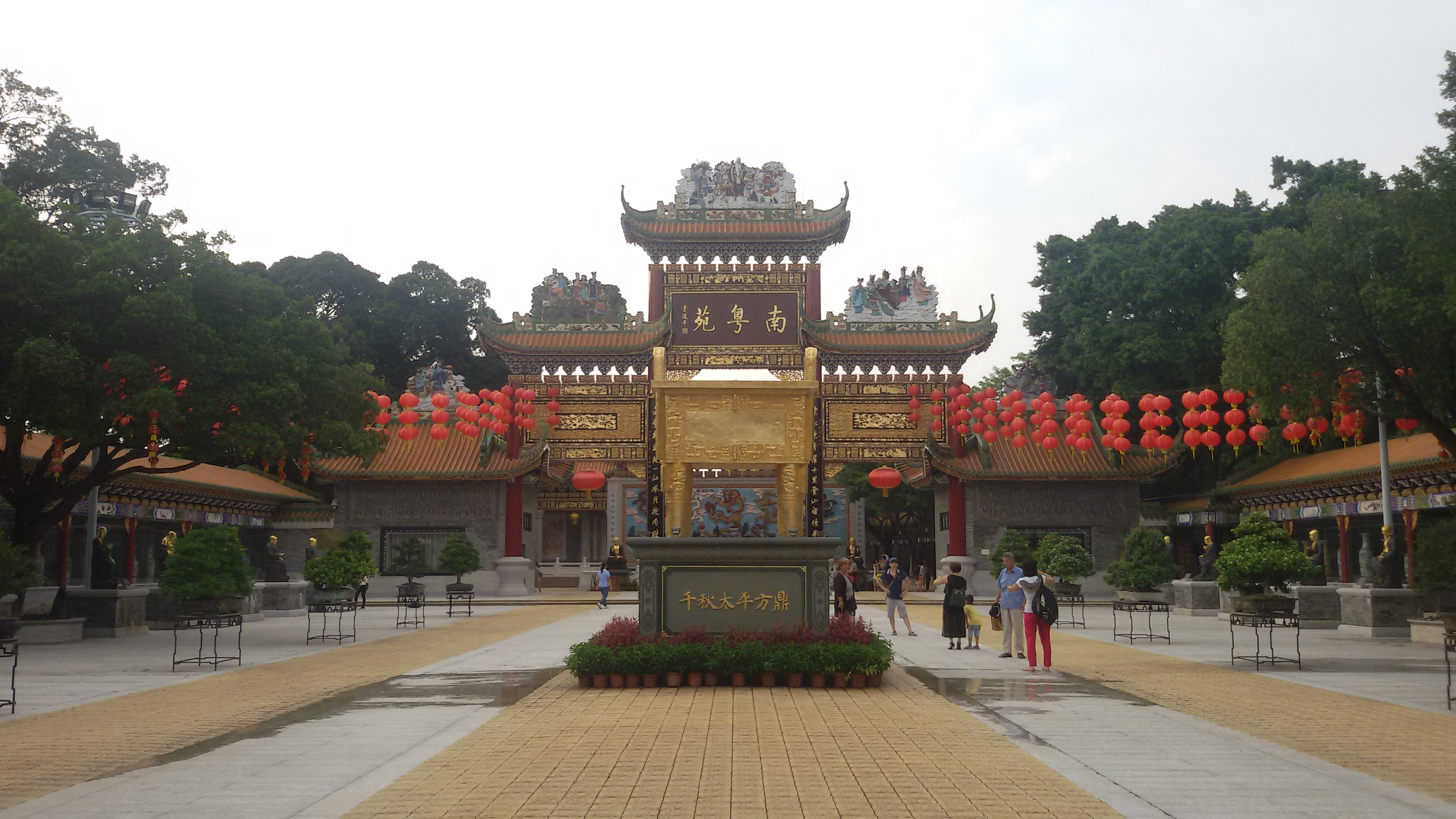
- Type: A Lingnan-style Chinese garden.
- Location: Zini Village, Shawan Town, Fanyu District, Guangzhou, Guangdong, China.
- Coordinates: 22.8971046°N 113.2902079°E
- Established: 2009
- Open: 8:00-17:30

Nanyue Yuan (simplified Chinese: 南粤苑; traditional Chinese: 南粵苑; lit. 'Southern Yue Garden') is a Lingnan-style Chinese garden in Guangzhou, China. It is adjacent to its sister garden, Baomo Yuan, and joint tickets are available.

== Development ==
The site started construction in December 2007, and opened on 28 September 2009. People's Daily reported that the construction costed more than 200 million Yuan.

== Features ==
The site features landscaped gardens, a lake, Lingnan architecture, various art and antiques. One of the architectural features is a nine-dragon wall made from ceramics. The garden is adjacent to Baomo Yuan but is smaller and covers 100 acres.

== Etymology ==
Nanyue refers to the Southern Yue period of history (204–111BCE).

== See also ==
- List of Chinese gardens
