= Baomo Yuan =

Garden in Guangzhou, China

- 宝墨园 (Chinese)
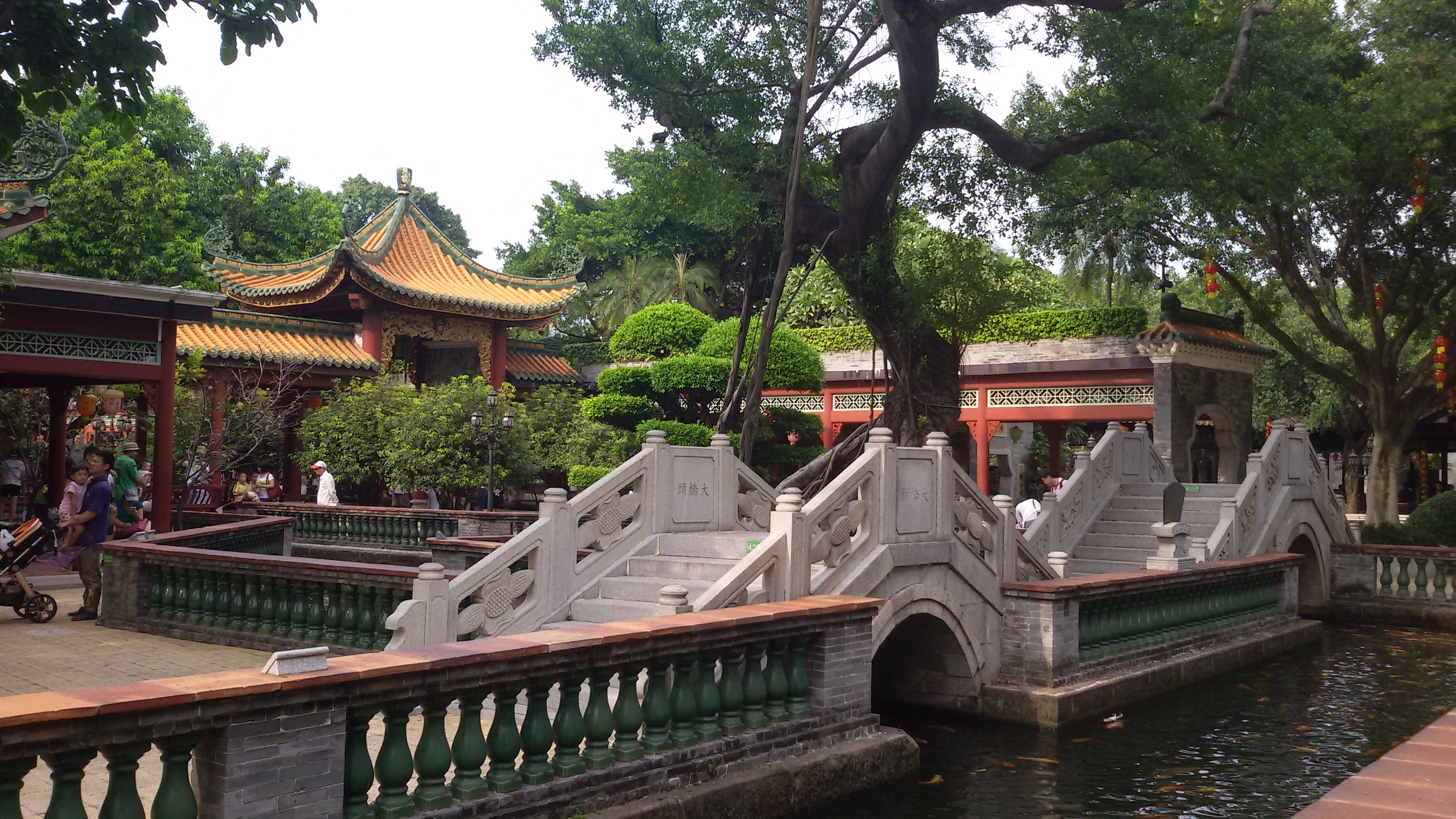
- Type: A Lingnan-style Chinese garden.
- Location: Zini Village, Shawan Town, Fanyu District, Guangzhou, Guangdong, China.
- Coordinates: 22.8961392°N 113.2911684°E
- Established: Late Qing dynasty (destroyed 1957, rebuilt 1995)
- Open: 8:00-17:30

Baomo Yuan (simplified Chinese: 宝墨园; traditional Chinese: 寶墨園; lit. 'Bao Zheng's Inkstone Garden') is a Lingnan-style garden in Guangzhou, China. It is adjacent to its sister garden, Nanyue Yuan, and joint tickets are available.

== Conception and etymology ==
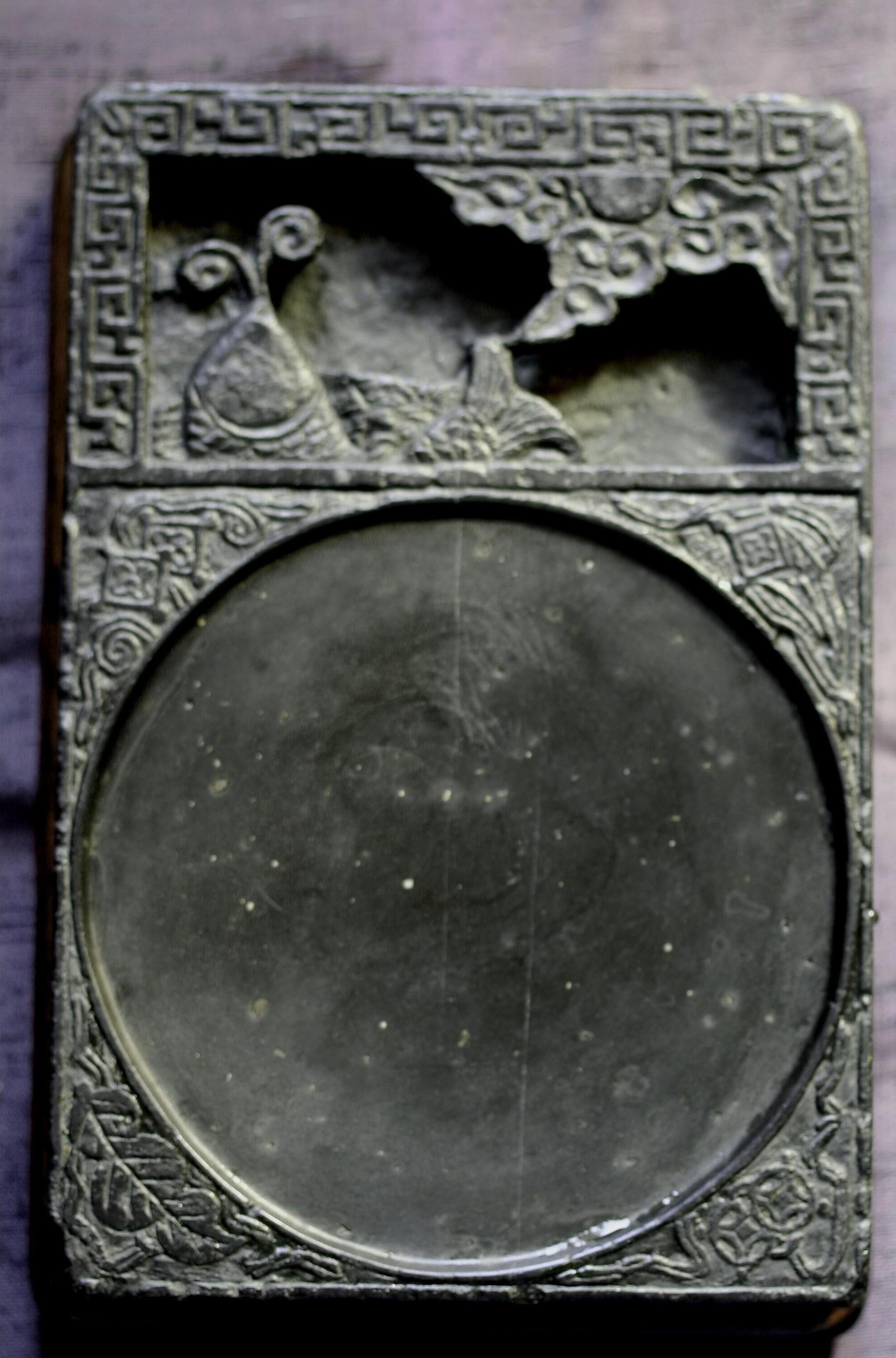
A Song dynasty inkstone.

The garden was conceived in the late Qing dynasty in memory of Bao Zheng (999–1062), who was seen as an exemplar incorruptible official in the Northern Song dynasty, and said to have formerly resided at the site.

Bao Zheng is said to have put an end to an instance of corruption whereby officials had been pressing for an excessive number of inkstones from producers in fraudulent excess of the amount required as imperial tribute for personal gain. The garden's name is supposed to remind visitors of this story.

== Features ==
The garden features common elements of Chinese garden architecture such as ponds, bridges, pavilions, rocks.

== History ==
The garden was destroyed in 1957 and rebuilt in 1995.

== See also ==
- List of Chinese gardens
