= Lingnan penjing =

Style of penjing in Lingnan, China

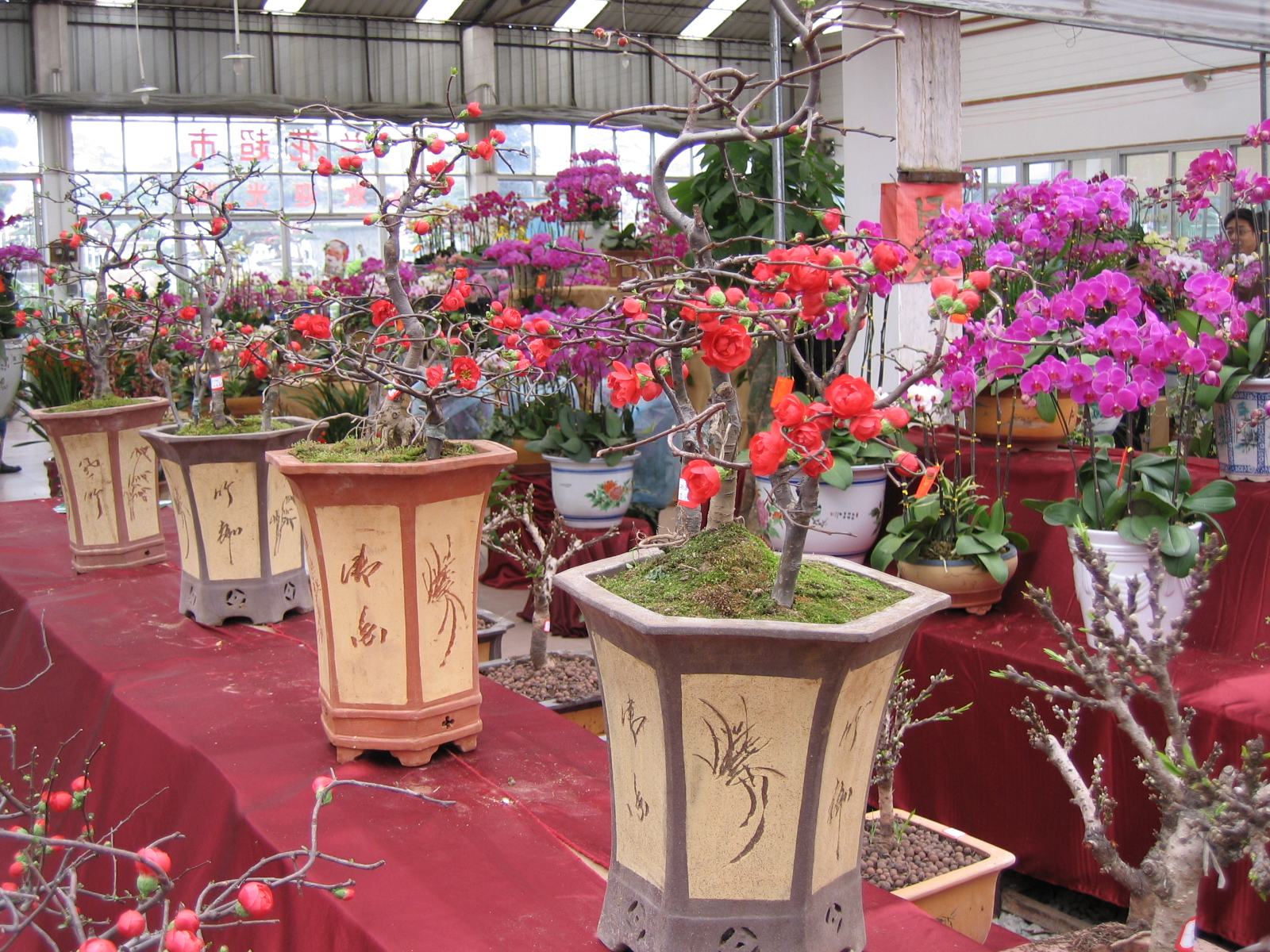
Penjing being sold in a flowermarket in Futsan, Guangdong.

Lingnan penjing (Chinese: 嶺南盆景; Jyutping: Ling5 naam5 pun4 ging2), sometimes called Cantonese penjing (Chinese: 粵派盆景; Jyutping: Jyut6 paai3 pun4 ging2), is the style of penjing of the predominantly Cantonese-speaking Lingnan region. Despite being recognized only in early 20th century, this style can trace its roots to at least the 15th century.

== Aesthetics ==
It is said that Lingnan penjing "embraces nature", and is not inclined to be bounded by rules or formula. It has been described as "Spring from the Mother Nature, Exceed the Mother Nature" (Chinese: 源於自然，超於自然): This style is noted for an emphasis on the match between "the natural" and "the artificial" parts of the bonsai. For instance, artists of Lingnan penjing tend to spend much time choosing a pot that matches the plants. Furthermore, it explicitly focuses on "inner beauty" - Lingnan penjing artists always pay attention to the penjing's own unique ambiance and mood. When viewing a Lingnan penjing, a viewer is expected to savor the messages and emotions behind the penjing work.

== Techniques ==
Lingnan penjing artists generally prune their trees with the "Grow and Clip" method. Instead of using wires to bend them, the branches keep being clipped as they grow. Every clip creates a new twist and a new section on the said branch, and in every section grows new branches. At last, as the tree keeps growing and being pruned in this way, it will taper from the base to apex. The result is that the proportions between the trunk and branches will be highly developed, with branches full of turns and twists.

== See also ==
- Penjing
- Cantonese culture
- Lingnan garden
