= Sichuanese garden =

Chinese garden style

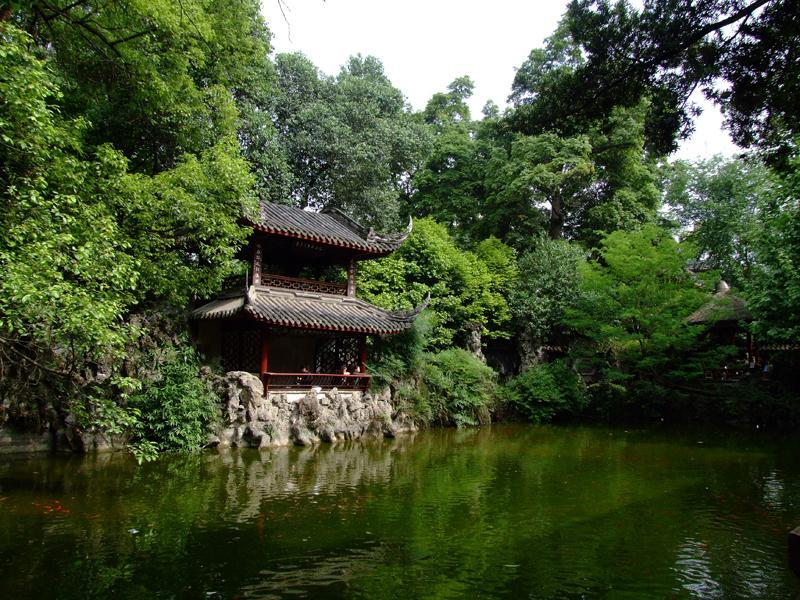
- Yanhuachi, originally built during the Song dynasty
- Chinese: 四川园林
- Hanyu Pinyin: Sìchuān yuánlín
- Si^{4}cuan^{1} yuan^{2}nin^{2}
Transcriptions
Standard Mandarin
- Hanyu Pinyin: Sìchuān yuánlín
other Mandarin
- Sichuanese Pinyin: Si^{4}cuan^{1} yuan^{2}nin^{2}

Ba-Shu garden
- Chinese: 巴蜀园林
- Hanyu Pinyin: Bāshǔ yuánlín
- Ba^{1}su^{2} yuan^{2}nin^{2}
Transcriptions
Standard Mandarin
- Hanyu Pinyin: Bāshǔ yuánlín
other Mandarin
- Sichuanese Pinyin: Ba^{1}su^{2} yuan^{2}nin^{2}

The Sichuanese garden or Ba–Shu garden is one of the major regional styles of Chinese garden developed in the Sichuan and Chongqing regions. Most of the Sichuanese gardens are located on Chengdu Plain and were built by the government as public gardens to memorize significant local celebrities, which distinguishes them from those private gardens in East China (e.g. Suzhou) and those imperial gardens in Beijing.

East Lake in Xinfan, Chengdu is one of the only two existing Chinese gardens which were built during the Tang dynasty (618–907).

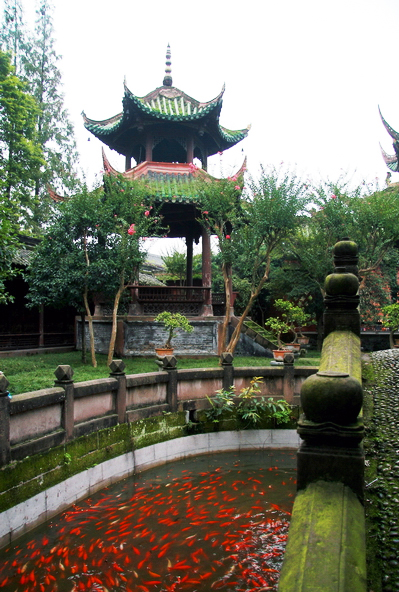
Yanhuachi

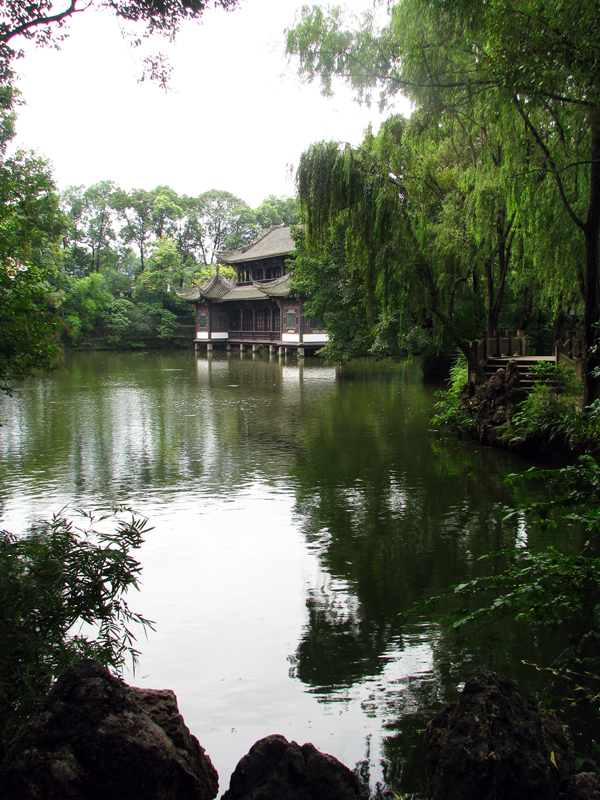
Sheng'an Guihu

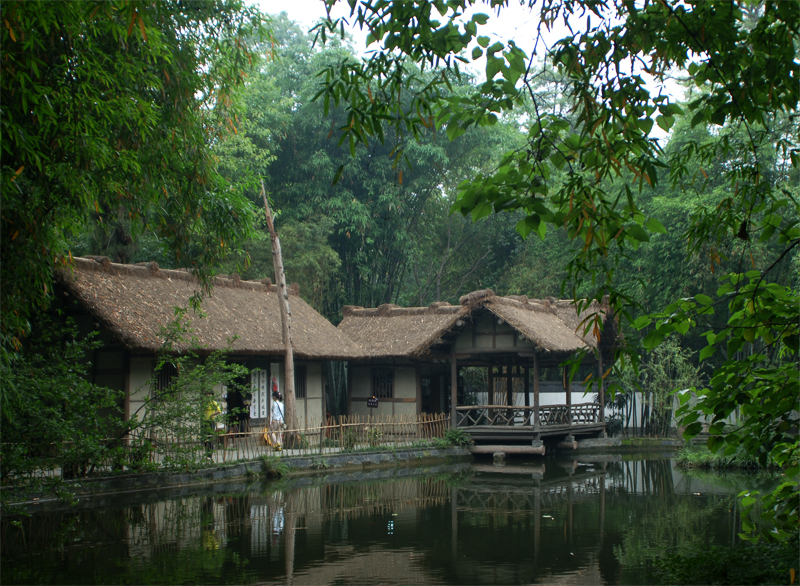
Du Fu Thatched Cottage

== See also ==
- List of garden types
