= Liang's Garden =

Historic Chinese garden in Foshan, Guangdong

- 梁园
- Liang's Garden in 2022
- Interactive map of Liang's Garden
- Location: Chancheng District, Foshan, Guangdong, China
- Coordinates: 23.03858°N 113.11257°E

Liang's Garden (Chinese: 梁园; pinyin: Liángyuán), also known as Liang Yuan or Foshan Liang Garden, is a historic Chinese garden in Chancheng District, Foshan, Guangdong, China. Established by members of the Liang family during the Qing dynasty, it is a representative example of traditional Lingnan garden design.

Liang's Garden is traditionally counted among the four famous gardens of Guangdong, alongside Qinghui Garden in Shunde, Keyuan in Dongguan, and Yuyin Garden in Guangzhou.

The garden complex combines residential buildings, ancestral halls, courtyards, ponds, ornamental rocks and vegetation. Its design reflects the artistic interests of Qing-dynasty scholars and the landscape traditions of southern China.

== History ==
Liang's Garden was developed between the Jiaqing and Daoguang reigns of the Qing dynasty, approximately from 1796 to 1850. Its construction was undertaken over more than four decades by four members of the Liang family: Liang Airu (梁蔼如), Liang Jiuzhang (梁九章), Liang Jiuhua (梁九华) and Liang Jiutu (梁九图). They were scholars and artists with interests in poetry, calligraphy and painting.

Rather than a single garden created at one time, Liang's Garden developed as a collection of family residences and garden compounds. Different members of the family designed and maintained their own sections, resulting in a complex with varied architectural arrangements and landscape features.

By the early Republican period, much of the original garden had deteriorated. In 1982, the Foshan authorities began conservation work on the surviving Qunxing Thatched Cottage complex.

In 1989, Liang's Garden was included in Guangdong's third group of provincial-level protected cultural heritage sites.

A major restoration programme began in 1994, with the restored complex reported to cover approximately 21,260 square metres.

Further conservation and redevelopment work began in 2016. In May 2021, additional restored and reconstructed sections, including the Fenjiang Thatched Cottage group and Wudaixie Studio, opened to visitors. The redevelopment enlarged the accessible garden complex and incorporated surrounding historic buildings.

In 2022, Liang's Garden was recognised as a national AAA tourist attraction in China.

== Layout and architecture ==
Liang's Garden comprises several historically distinct garden and residential groups. Its principal historic sites were situated around Xianfeng Ancient Path (先锋古道), Xixian Lane (西贤里) and Songgui Lane (松桂里) in central Foshan.

The principal garden groups include:

- Twelve-Stone Studio (十二石斋): Associated with Liang Jiutu, this compound reflects the family's interest in ornamental stones and the artistic traditions of scholarly gardens.
- Qunxing Thatched Cottage (群星草堂): Associated with Liang Jiuhua, this garden includes traditional halls, courtyards and ornamental stone arrangements.
- Fenjiang Thatched Cottage (汾江草庐): A waterside garden associated with Liang Jiutu, featuring ponds and traditional landscape architecture.
- Hanxiang House (寒香馆): A garden residence associated with Liang Jiuzhang.
- Wudaixie Studio (无怠懈斋): A study and garden associated with Liang Airu, reflecting his scholarly interests.

The buildings are arranged in close relationship with their surrounding gardens. Courtyards, covered corridors, pavilions and ancestral halls connect the residential spaces with ponds, trees and ornamental stones.

== Garden design ==
=== Landscape composition ===
Liang's Garden is an example of a Qing-dynasty literati villa in the Lingnan tradition. Its design integrates residential architecture, ancestral worship spaces and landscaped courtyards.

Water is an important feature of the garden. Ponds, winding waterways, waterside pavilions and vegetation create a landscape associated with the waterways of the Pearl River Delta. Trees, flowering plants and ornamental rocks are arranged to complement the architecture.

The complex also incorporates artistic elements associated with the Liang family's literary pursuits, including calligraphy and poetry.

=== Ornamental rocks ===
Ornamental stone arrangements are among the most distinctive features of Liang's Garden. The garden is known for displaying individual rocks as independent landscape compositions rather than relying exclusively on large artificial rockeries.

According to historical accounts, the garden once contained more than 400 ornamental stones, although many were subsequently lost. The surviving stone displays include examples associated with Taihu, Lingbi and Yingde rock traditions.

Some historically named stones evoke Chinese literary and religious subjects, including Su Wu Tending Sheep (苏武牧羊) and Child Worshipping Guanyin (童子拜观音).

=== Cultural significance ===
As one of Guangdong's four celebrated historic gardens, it is an important surviving example of Lingnan garden culture and the region's architectural heritage.

== See also ==
- Lingnan architecture
- Qinghui Garden
