= Lingnan architecture =

Overview of Cantonese architecture

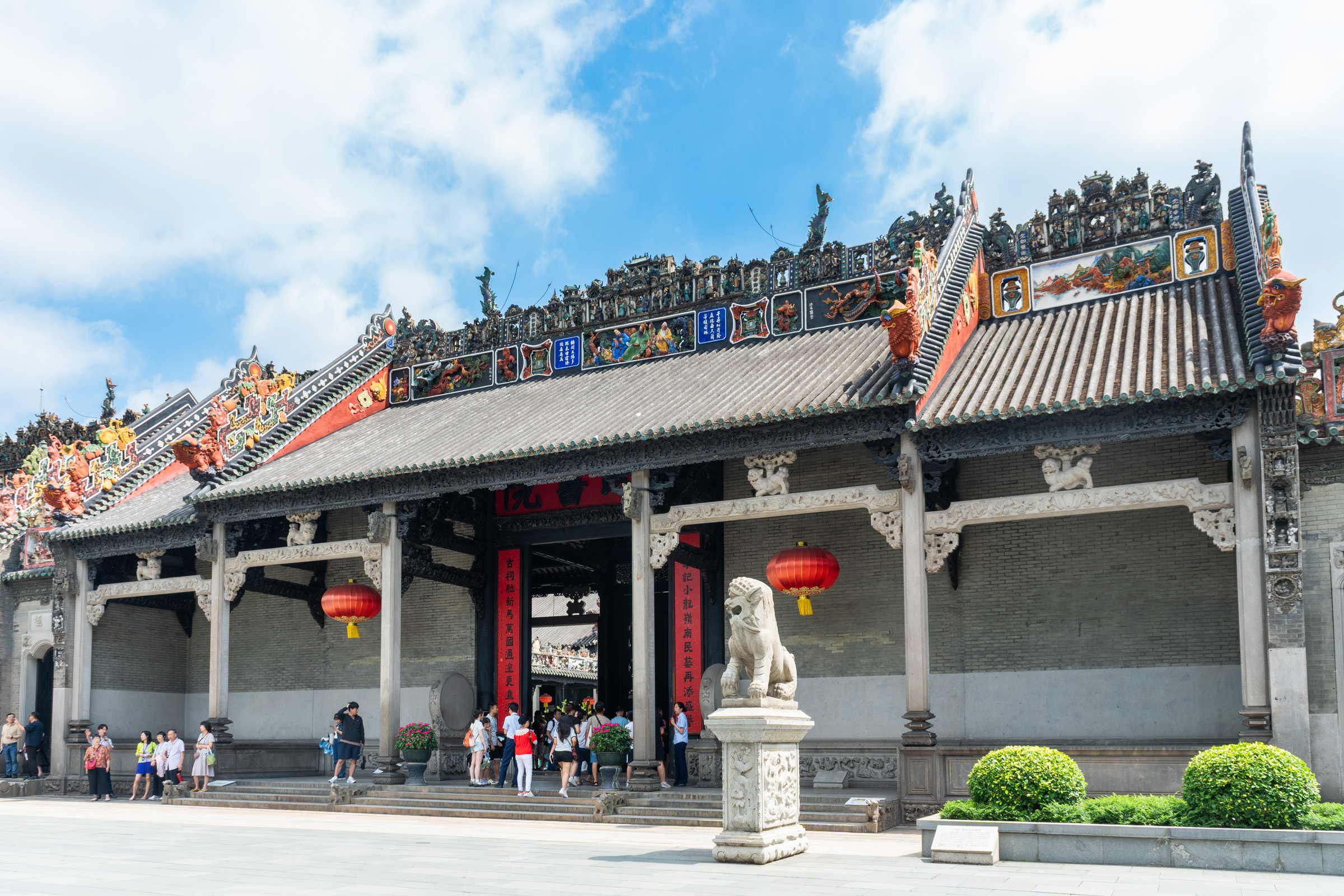
The Chen Clan Ancestral Hall in Guangzhou is widely considered a good example of classical Lingnan architecture.

Lingnan architecture (Chinese: 嶺南建築; Jyutping: Ling^{5} naam^{4} gin^{3} zuk^{1}), or Cantonese architecture, refers to the characteristic architectural style(s) of the Lingnan region – the Southern Chinese provinces of Guangdong and Guangxi. Usually, it is referring to the architecture associated with the Cantonese people, with other peoples in the area (such as the Hakka and the Teochew) having their own styles. This style began with the architecture of the ancient non-Han Nanyue people and absorbed certain architectural elements from the Tang Empire and Song Empire as the region sinicized in the later half of the first millennium AD.

Its Lingnan style is defined by: Adaptability (blending Chinese & Western elements), Functionality (ventilation & shade), and the central use of Water Features, all suited to the local climate.

== Introduction ==
Modern day's Lingnan architecture is distinct from its counterparts in other Han Chinese regions because Cantonese people adapt their architecture to the geography of the region: the region has a subtropical climate, very unlike China's central plain (Zhongyuan). The set of building materials Cantonese have had access to also differs from that of other Han Chinese groups due to, for instance, difference in the tree species available.

Overall, the classical Lingnan style, which is the best-known of Lingnan architecture, tends to favor pale colors such as green and white, avoid circular structures, adopt large numbers of relief carvings and sculptures, have many open structures like balconies and verandas, and be built using materials resistant to molds and moisture. The last two points are obviously related to the hot and humid subtropical climate of Lingnan.

Chen Clan Ancestral Hall in Guangzhou is seen as a representative example of classical Lingnan architecture. The temple was built in late 19th century and served as an academy for Chan families in 72 counties of the Guangdong province. It comprises all sorts of folk architectural and decorative arts, and is famous for its "three carvings" (stone, wood and brick carvings), "three sculptures" (ceramic sculpture, clay sculpture and colorful sculpture) and "one cast" (cast iron). As a result, it is called the best of all the clan temples in the neighborhood.

Today, some elements of Lingnan architecture are adopted in the construction of commercial districts in Guangzhou, the capital city of Guangdong province. In commercial streets, old-fashioned shops of classical Lingnan architecture are found in heaps. Attached to the second story from the pavement, numerous pillars are built in front of the stores. Similar building styles are still relatively common in some areas of Hong Kong and Macau.

== Pre-sinicization: Nanyue architecture ==
Previously, not much research has been done on the architectural style(s) of the Nanyue people, the original Baiyue inhabitants of Lingnan before the region sinicized. There are, however, several heritage sites from that period, giving clues to what Nanyue architecture might have been like. The Mausoleum of the Nanyue King (Chinese: 南越王墓; Jyutping: Naam^{4} jyut^{6} wong^{4} mou^{6}), for instance, was built in about 120 BC and uncovered in 1983. It served as the tomb for Ziu Mo, the second king of the Nanyue kingdom. It has been noted that the architecture has several dissimilarities from its Zhongyuan counterpart from the same time period: The mausoleum used corridors with curved turns, crescent-shaped ponds, and steep walls on the west side and tilt walls on the east. The bottom of its waterways were paved with pebbles and gravel, resulting in the drainage water forming small whirlpools upon hitting the walls.

The Crooked Stone Brook from the Nanyue Kingdom period was discovered in the center of Guangzhou in 1997. This stone watercourse originally extended 180 meters, with 160 meters preserved today. It winds from the northeast to the southwest, featuring artificial hydraulic structures including a sharp bend, crescent-shaped pond, down slopes, through bridges and over stepping-stones. The landscape artistry embodies sophisticated Qin-Han garden engineering with its meandering, multi-functional design. It represents the earliest and best-preserved example of Qin-Han imperial gardens found to date. It is now the Site of Palace and Garden as part of the Nanyue King Museum.

=== Examples of Nanyue architecture ===
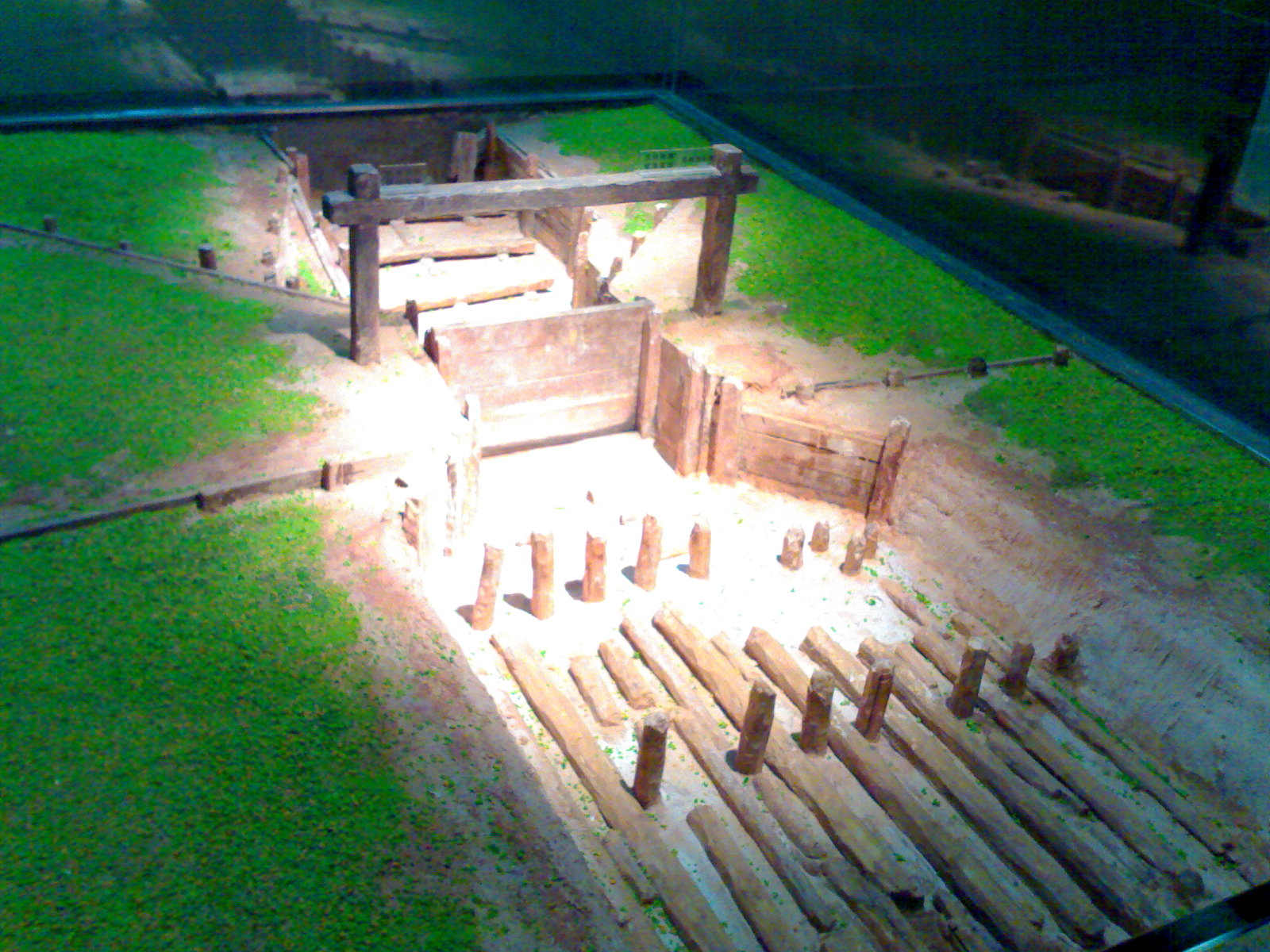
A model of the sluice of Nanyue; It is the oldest, largest, and most well-preserved example of sluice from that time period.

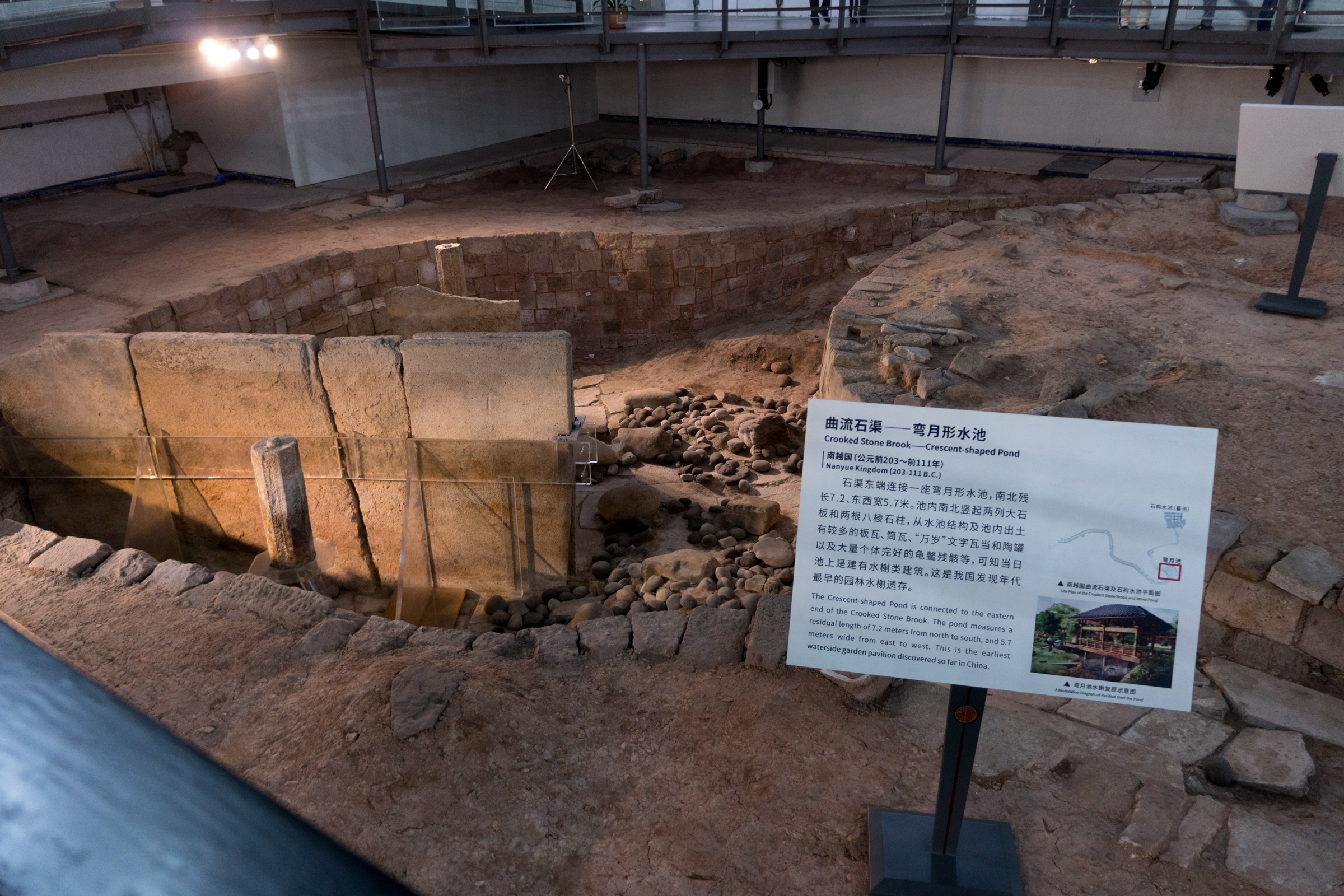
Ruin of the Crooked Stone Brook of Nanyue

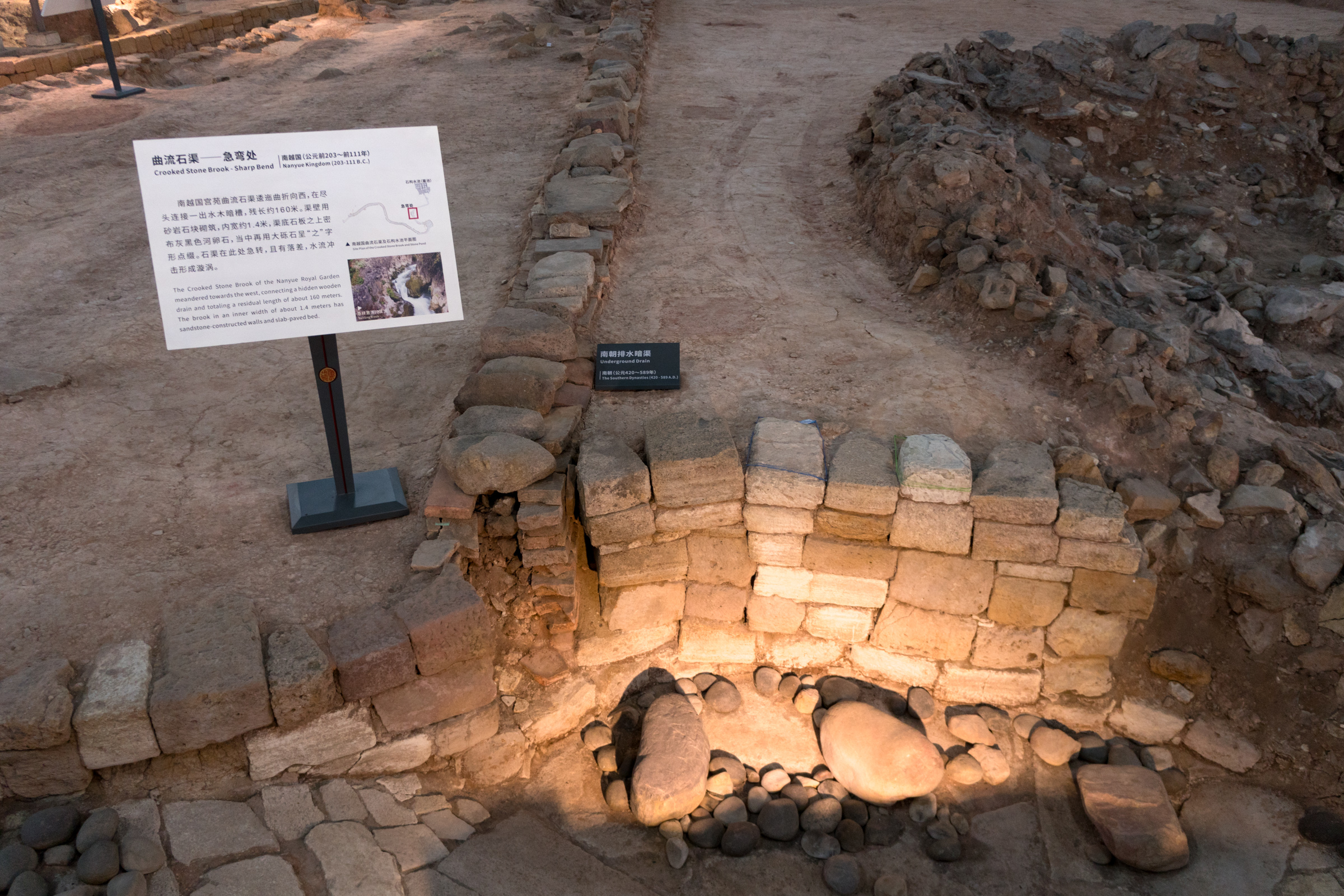
Sharp bend at the Crooked Stone Brook of Nanyue

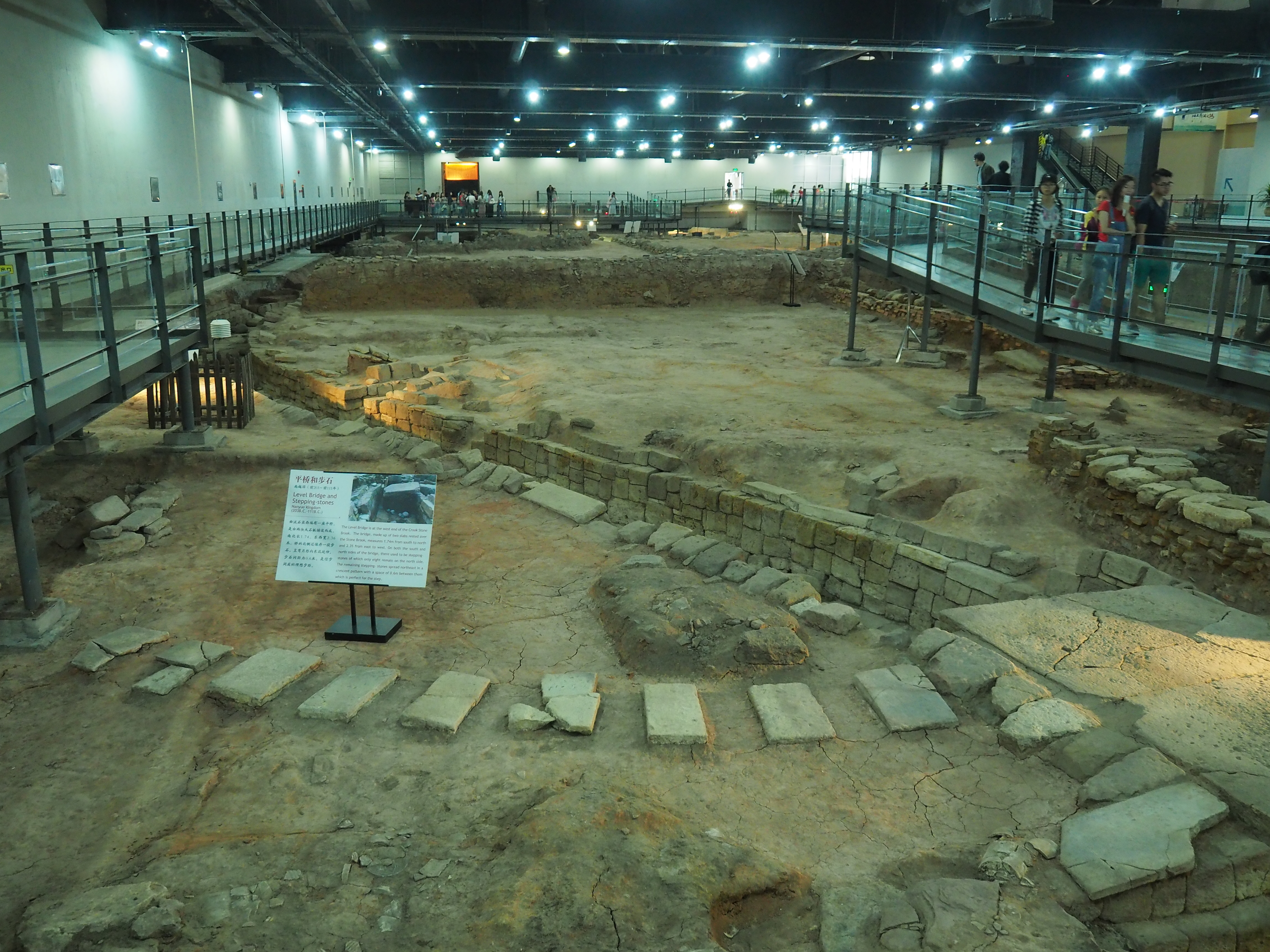
Stone level bridge and stepping-stones of Nanyue

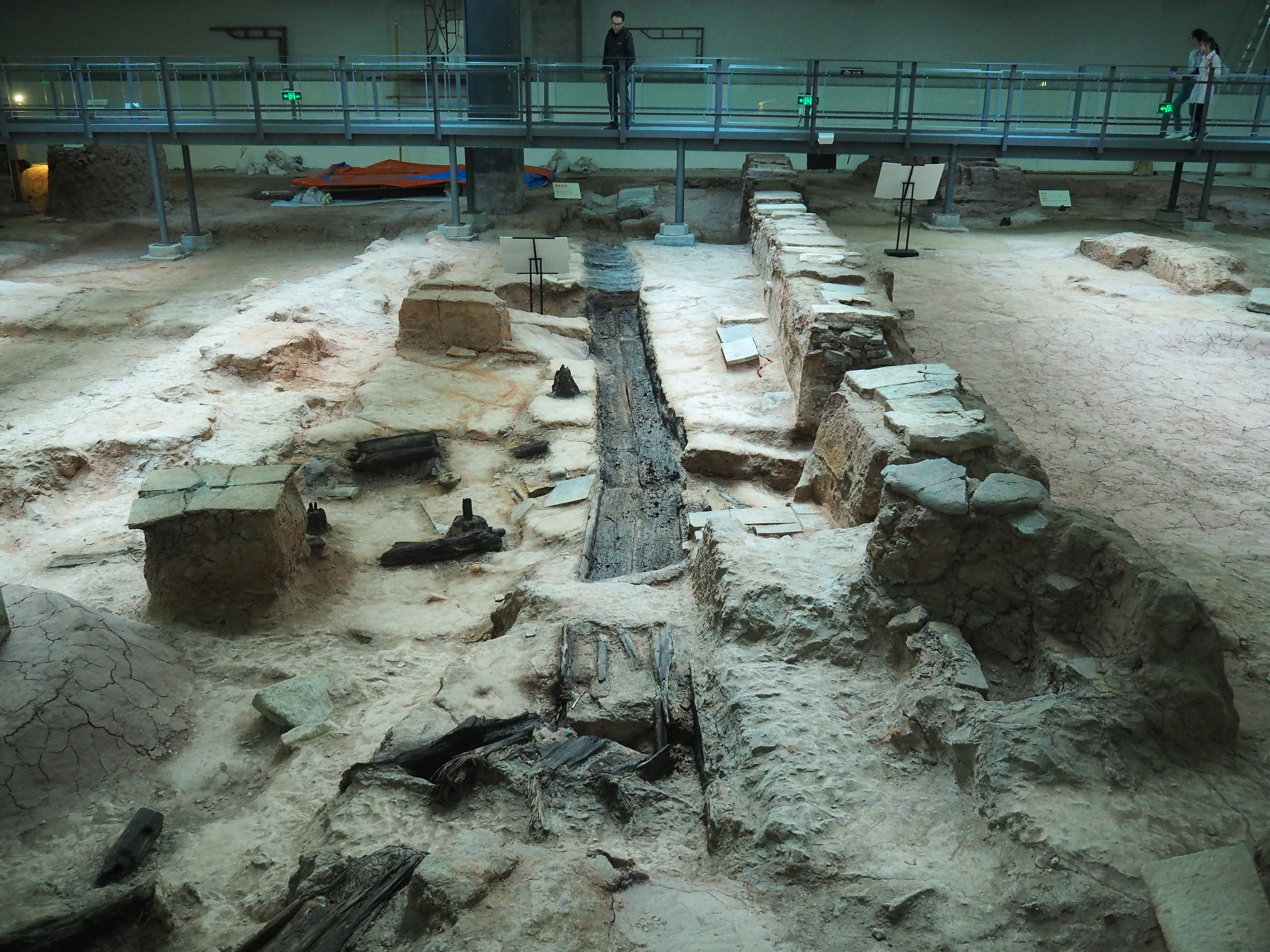
Underground trough of Nanyue

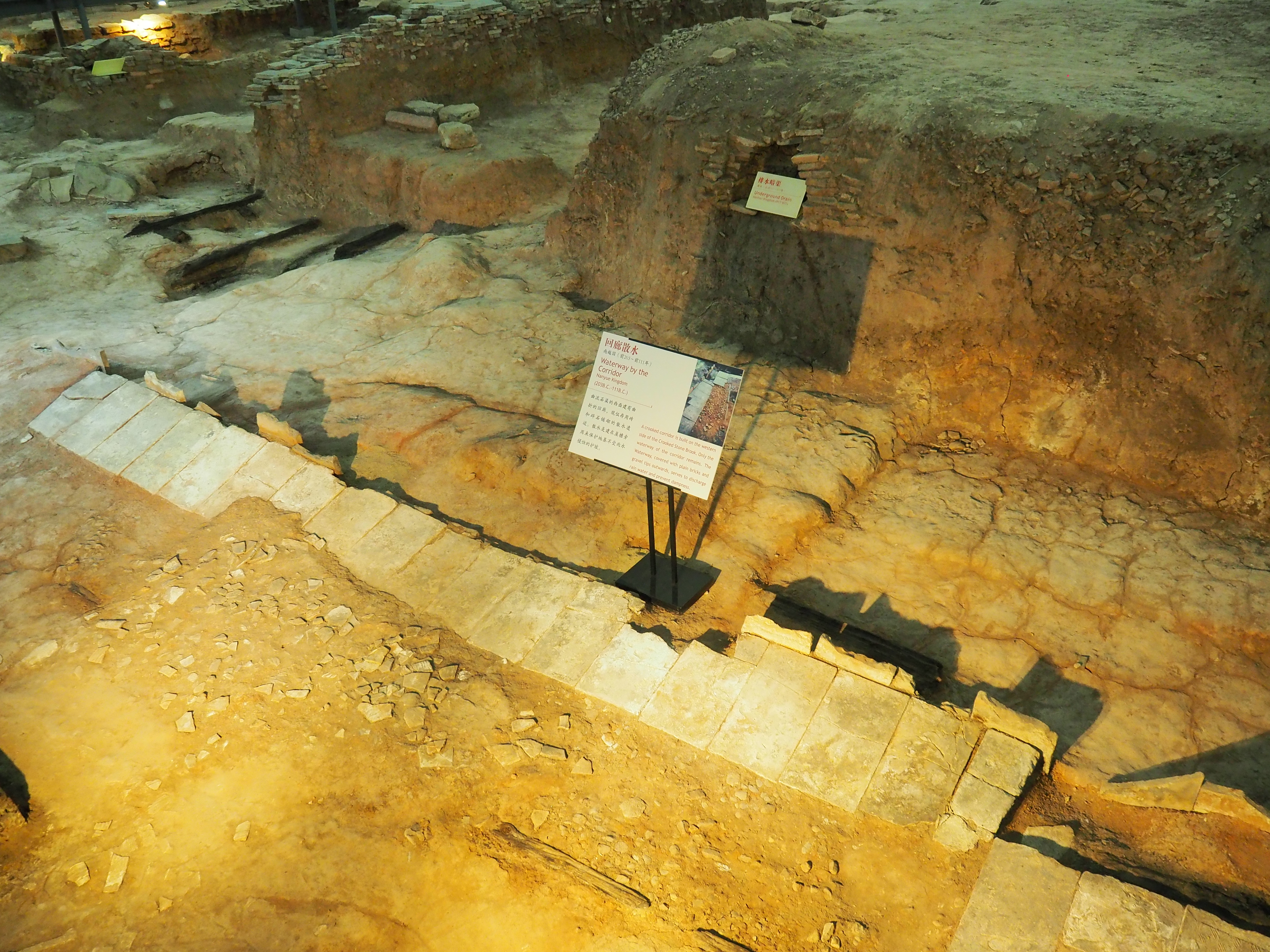
Waterway by the corridor of Nanyue

== Tang architecture ==
The siniciziation of Lingnan was prominent during the Tang dynasty (7th to 10th century), which results in Lingnan culture (i.e., Cantonese culture) being strongly influenced by Tang culture and having preserved much Tang heritage not preserved in other branches of modern Han Chinese culture. Between 4th to 10th century, many monks came from Zhongyuan to spread Buddhism in Lingnan, resulting in the construction of religious structure such as Guangxiao Temple (Chinese: 光孝寺; Jyutping: Jyutping: Gwong^{1} haau^{3} zi^{6}; lit. 'Temple of Light and Filial Piety') although no structure from the Tang Dynasty era exists anywhere in Lingnan today. Also, since the 19th century, the Tang style has seen a revival in the region, whether in Hong Kong and Macau or the mainland part of Lingnan. A prominent example is the Chi Lin Nunnery in Hong Kong.

This style of architecture is very unlike classical Lingnan architecture: It is (1) primarily built with wood, rather than the green bricks typical of the classical Lingnan style; (2) tends to give a sense of grandness using upward-curving roofs and bright colors, in stark contrast to the rectangular and pale classical Lingnan style; and (3) has highly orderly arrangement of buildings. Buildings of this style bears much resemblance to the Buddhist temples in Kyoto, Japan, which are also heavily based on Tang architecture.

=== Modern reconstructed buildings in Lingnan in Tang style ===
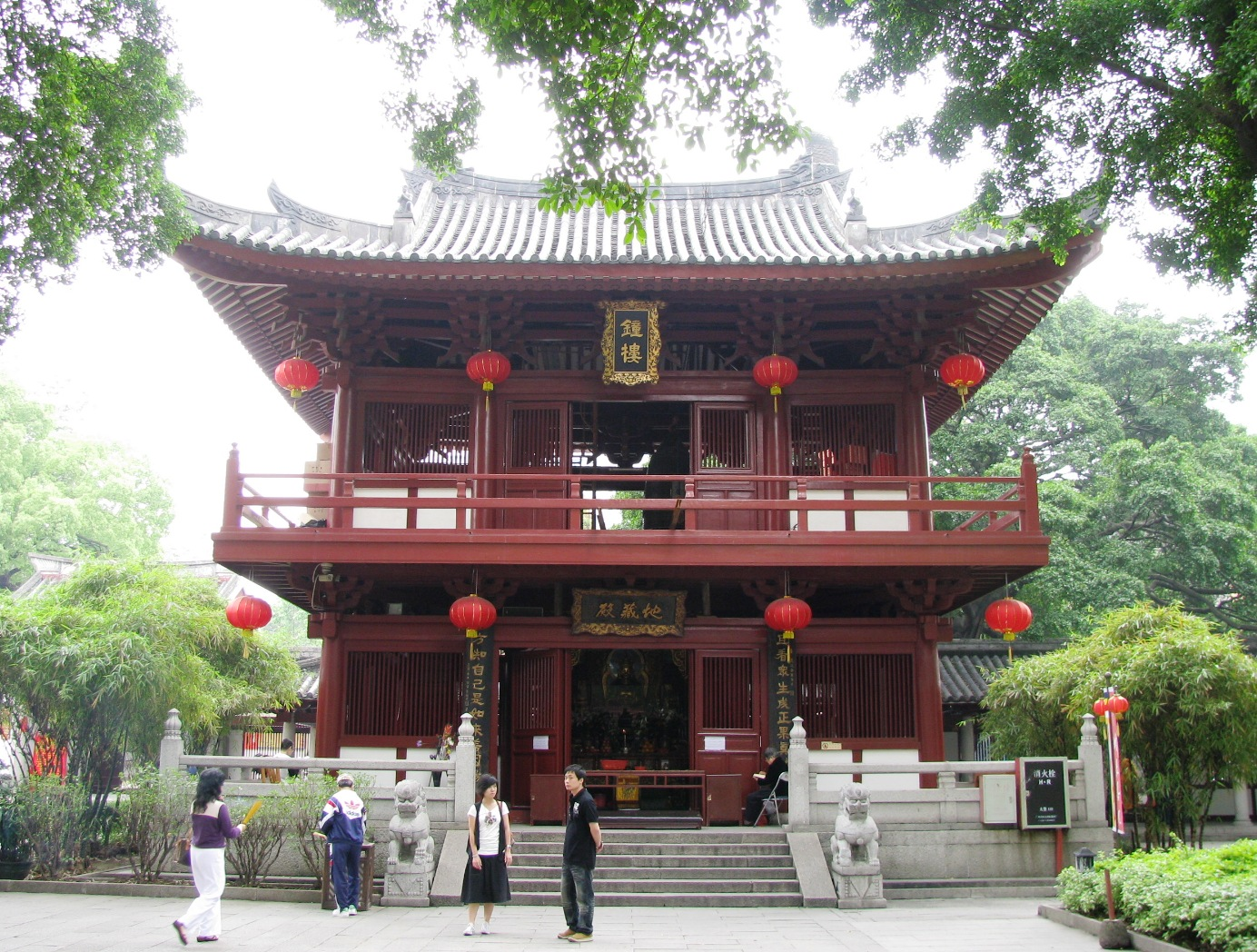
Modern day 20th century reconstructed Guangxiao Temple's buildings have upward-curving roofs.

== Classical Lingnan architecture ==
As sinicization of Lingnan completed in Southern Song dynasty (10th to 13th century), the classical Lingnan style seen today slowly formed. The classical Lingnan style formed as early as 14th century and represents Cantonese people's adaptation of their hybrid culture (i.e., with elements of Nanyue, Tang, and Song) to the region's geography. Nowadays, it is widely considered a major Cantonese accomplishment and tourist attraction for Guangdong and eastern Guangxi. Commonly cited characteristics of the classical Lingnan style include:

=== Doors and directions ===
Classical Lingnan architecture pays much attention to the use of doors. This is partly due to the influence of a strong Feng shui culture: There is the traditional belief that having the main door face south means prosperity, which results in most classical Lingnan-style buildings (especially ancestral halls) facing south. Larger buildings also tend to have many types of doors, with "central doors" (Jyutping: Zung^{1} mun^{4}; Traditional Chinese: 中門) only usable for high-status individuals (i.e., male leaders of the household, important guests, and women with male heirs) in older times, while other people could only use "side doors" (Jyutping: Zak^{1} mun^{4}; Traditional Chinese: 側門). They also have a concept called "manner doors" (Jyutping: Ji^{4} mun^{4}; Traditional Chinese: 儀門), which means that there is a second door behind the main door. Manner doors are especially common in ancestral halls, where ancestors are worshiped, due to the traditional belief that one should not go straight at (which has connotations such as "to conflict with") one's ancestors upon entering the hall.

=== Narrow doors ===
Narrow door (Jyutping: Aai^{3} mun^{4}; Traditional Chinese: 隘門) is an architectural feature common in the classical Lingnan style, referring to a sudden narrowing of the walkway at the end of a corridor or alley. These narrow doors have been built to separate alleys from each other and set at tactically crucial points. They are traditionally open in daytime, and closed after sunset unless in case of emergency. They are used to form "defensive circles", in each of which a number (ranging from 2 to 50) of households help look out for one another. This feature arose to serve defensive purposes against bandits, pirates, and other clans.

=== Cold alleys ===
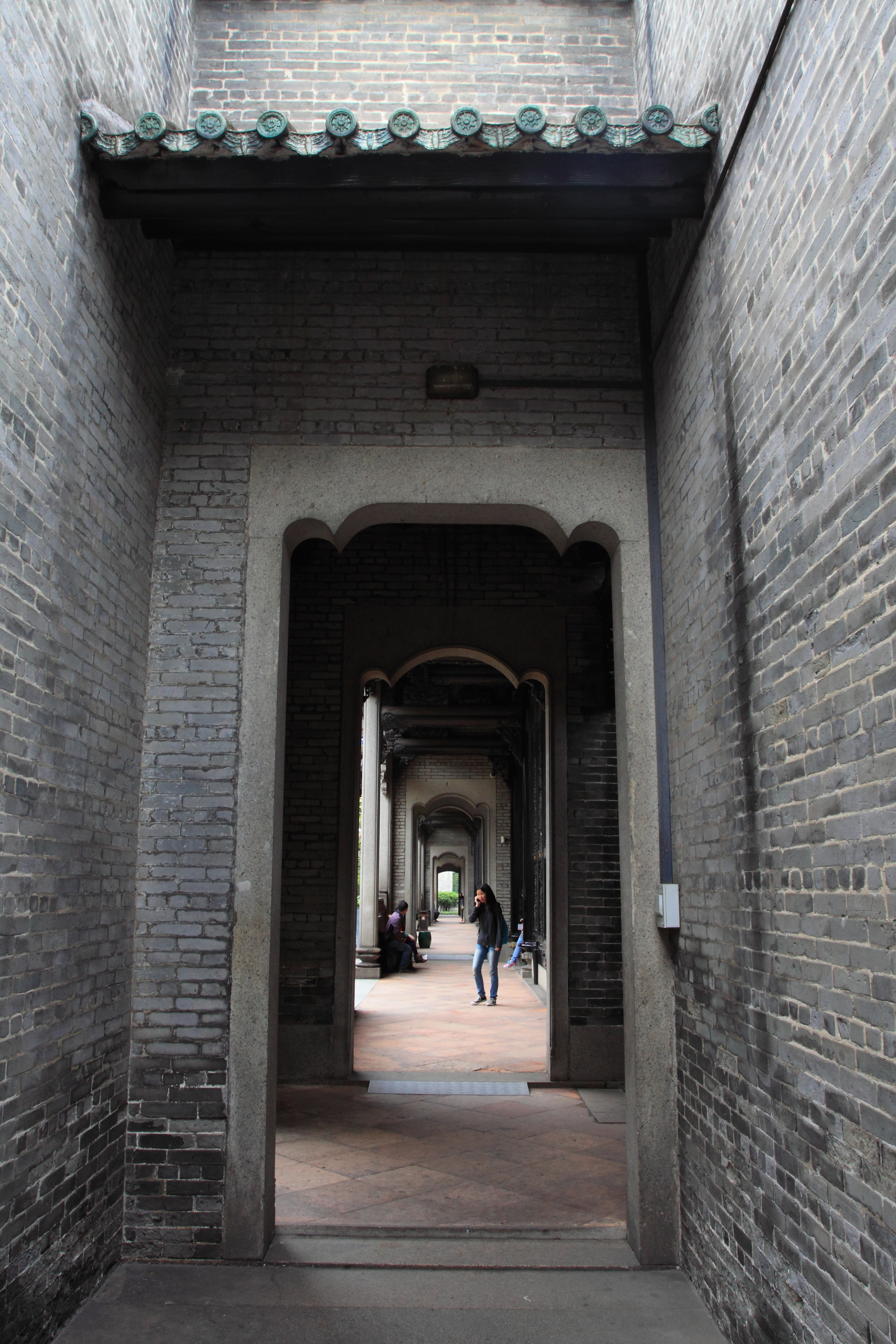
A cold alley.

Cold alleys (Jyutping: Laang^{5} hong^{2}; Traditional Chinese: 冷巷, literally "cold alley") has been called the "essence" of classical Lingnan architecture, and is utilized in the region outside the classical style. The cold alley is a narrow path walled on both sides by buildings, like a corridor within the complex. The narrowness of a cold alley results in an increase in wind speed within, which in turn causes the hot air in the rooms connected to the cold alley to be brought out more quickly while cool air enters, achieving good ventilation - a trait very useful in the subtropical Lingnan. Cold alleys can be divided into two types: indoor and outdoor. When used indoor, a cold alley rarely receives sunshine. When used outdoor, a cold alley (called "blue cloud alley" in this case) receives relatively little sunshine due to being shadowed by the tall buildings that wall it from both sides. Either way, this results in even better cooling effect.

=== Carvings and sculptures ===
Cantonese people have been known for being prolific craftsmen and merchants. The region historically exported a large number of sculptures and other craft products. The classical Lingnan style goes along with this: It traditionally uses very large amount of relief carvings and sculptures for the purpose of decorations (especially in temples and ancestral halls). The carvings and sculptures in question could be made from wood, bricks, stones, and so on. They are usually uncolored, but some are decorated with garish colors. The subject matters of these carvings and sculptures generally revolve around figures and scenes from Chinese mythology and Cantonese folktales.

=== Lingnan guardian lions ===
Chinese architecture in general uses guardian lions. However, it has been noted that Southern China has a style different from Northern China. Southern Chinese guardian lions are used in Lingnan, Fujian, and Taiwan. They are noted for having large heads and small legs, protruding skulls and flat noses, leaf-shaped ears, mouths set in roaring configurations, and sharp teeth. Lingnan guardian lions tend to be more elongated and have more varied poses. The male guardian lions are generally on the left side of the door and stepping on embroidered balls - which is considered to symbolize good luck.

=== Other characteristics ===
"Three rooms and two corridors" (Jyutping: Saam^{1} gaan^{1} loeng^{5} long^{4}; Traditional Chinese: 三間兩廊) is a typical layout found in classical Lingnan residential architecture, with Tai Fu Tai Mansion being a good example. Also, in classical Lingnan residence, indoor windows are usually small and high on the walls, for the purpose of defense against bandits. These windows, however, are poor at lighting up the rooms and thus often accompanied by skylights or other structures that involve opening on the ceilings.

=== Green brick ===
Green brick is a popular building material in the Lingnan region. It is well known for being resistant to changes in temperature and moisture - which makes it very useful for building in the hot and humid Lingnan region.

=== Gallery ===
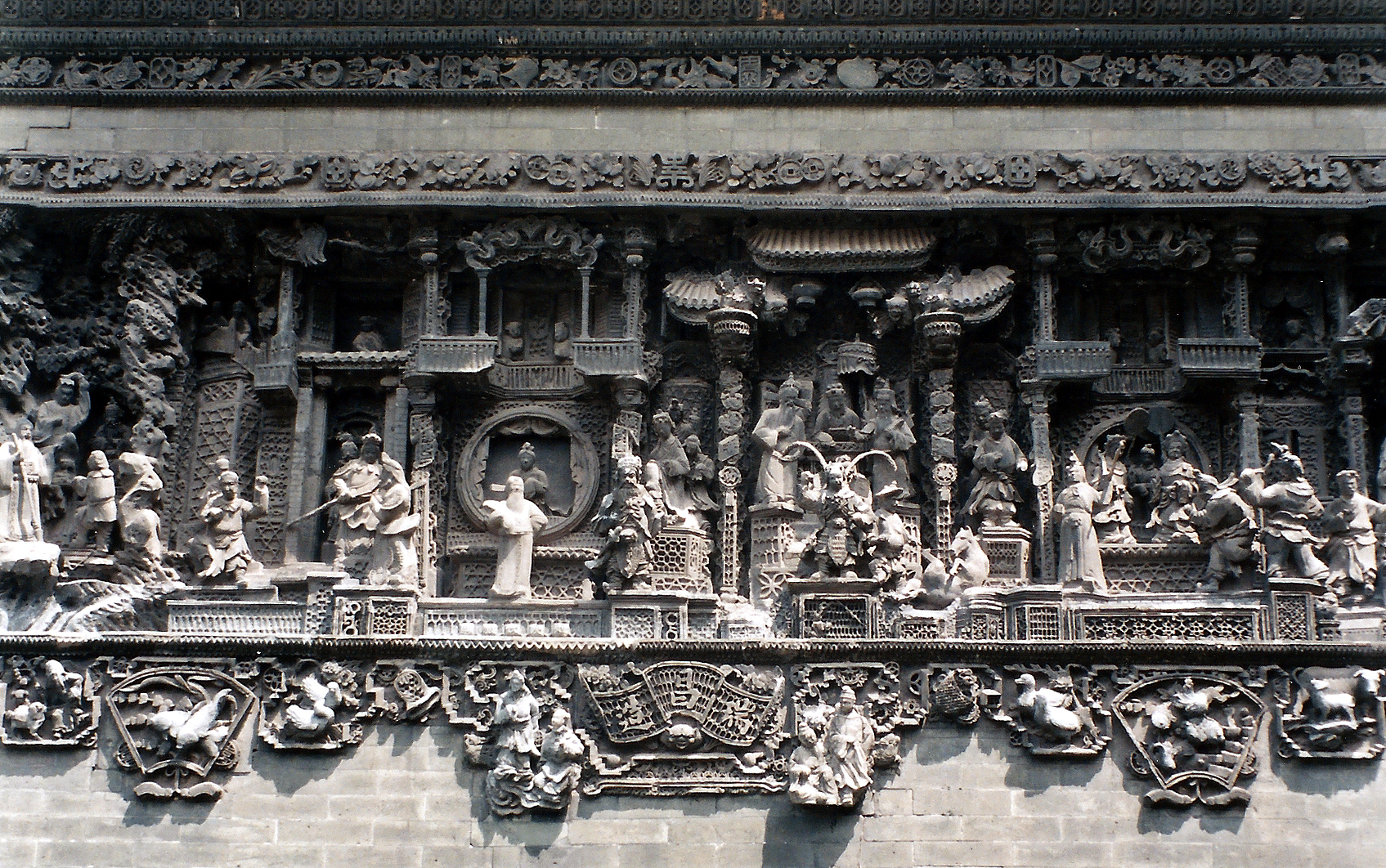
Relief carvings are very prevalent in the classical Lingnan style.

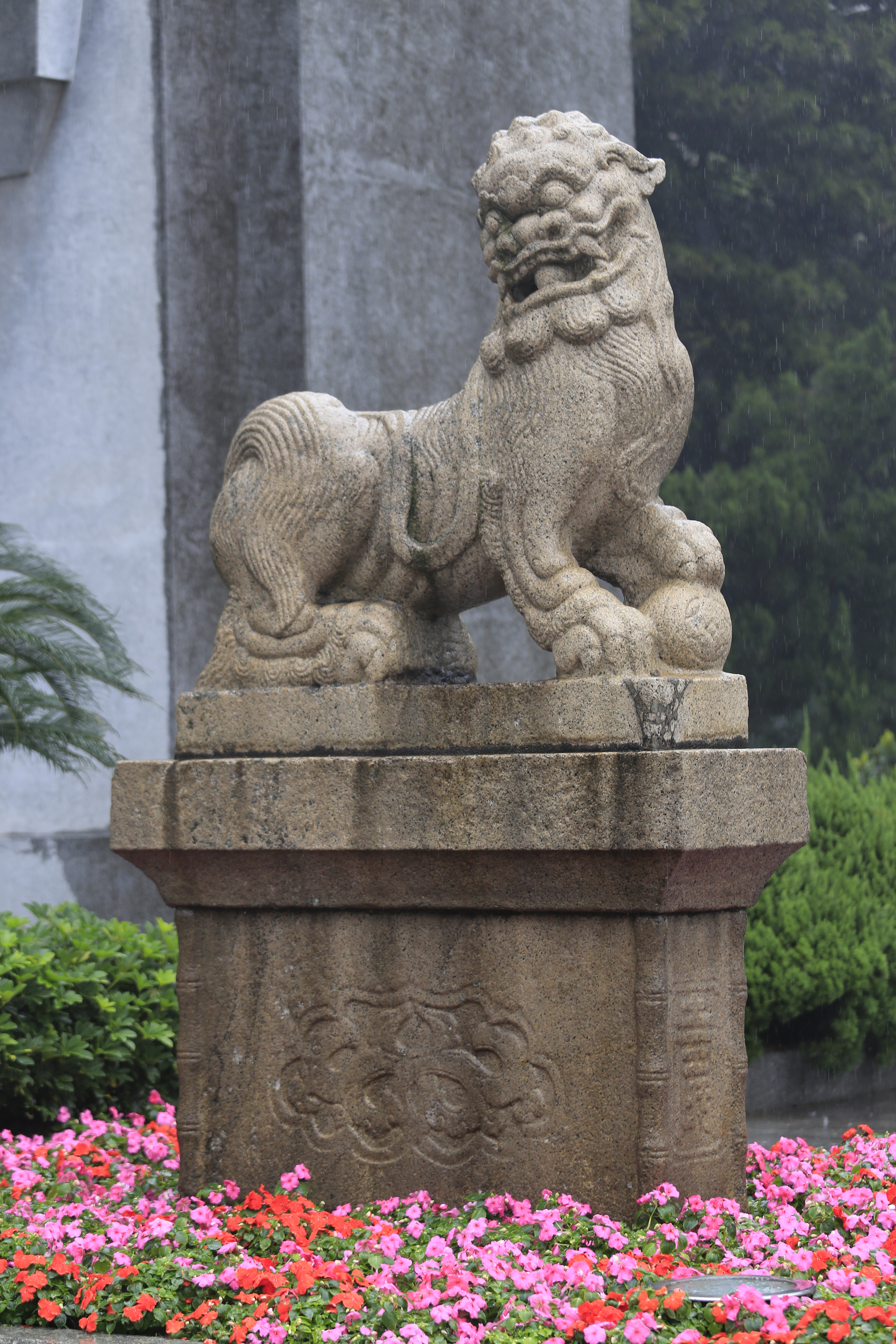
The guardian lion at Wong Fa Gong Park, Guangzhou, has quite an elongated body.

== Wok yi uk ==
Wok yi uk (Jyutping: Wok^{6} ji^{5} uk^{1}; Traditional Chinese: 鑊耳屋, literally "house with wok ears") is a distinct characteristic in Lingnan architecture. It is a building that has a pair of curved walls protruding vertically at both ends of its roof, usually seen in traditional residential buildings. It emerged at around 15th century, during which Lingnan was ruled by the Ming Empire. It was a tradition to build such walls for people who have been granted honors through the empire's examination system. This later evolved into the belief that building such walls could help one's sons and grandsons attain similar honors. It also has more practical purposes, however - having the two walls protruding from both ends of the roof could help reduce the amount of sunlight directly shining on the roof, resulting in lowered temperature. This is useful in the subtropical Lingnan region.

=== Wok yi uks in Lingnan ===
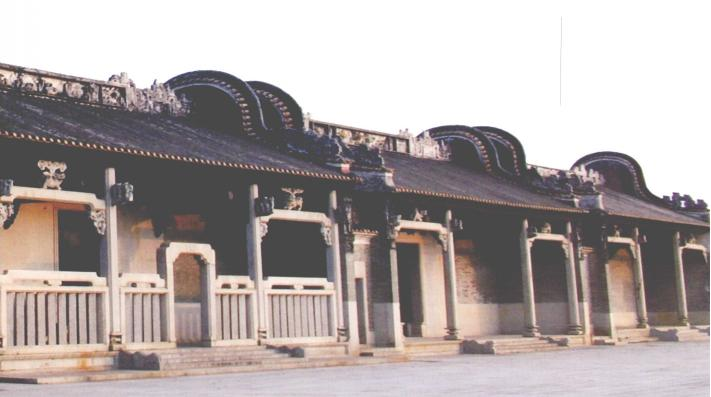
A row of wok yi uks in Fadou District, Guangzhou: Each house has a pair of curved walls protruding vertically at both ends of its roof.

== Oyster shell house ==
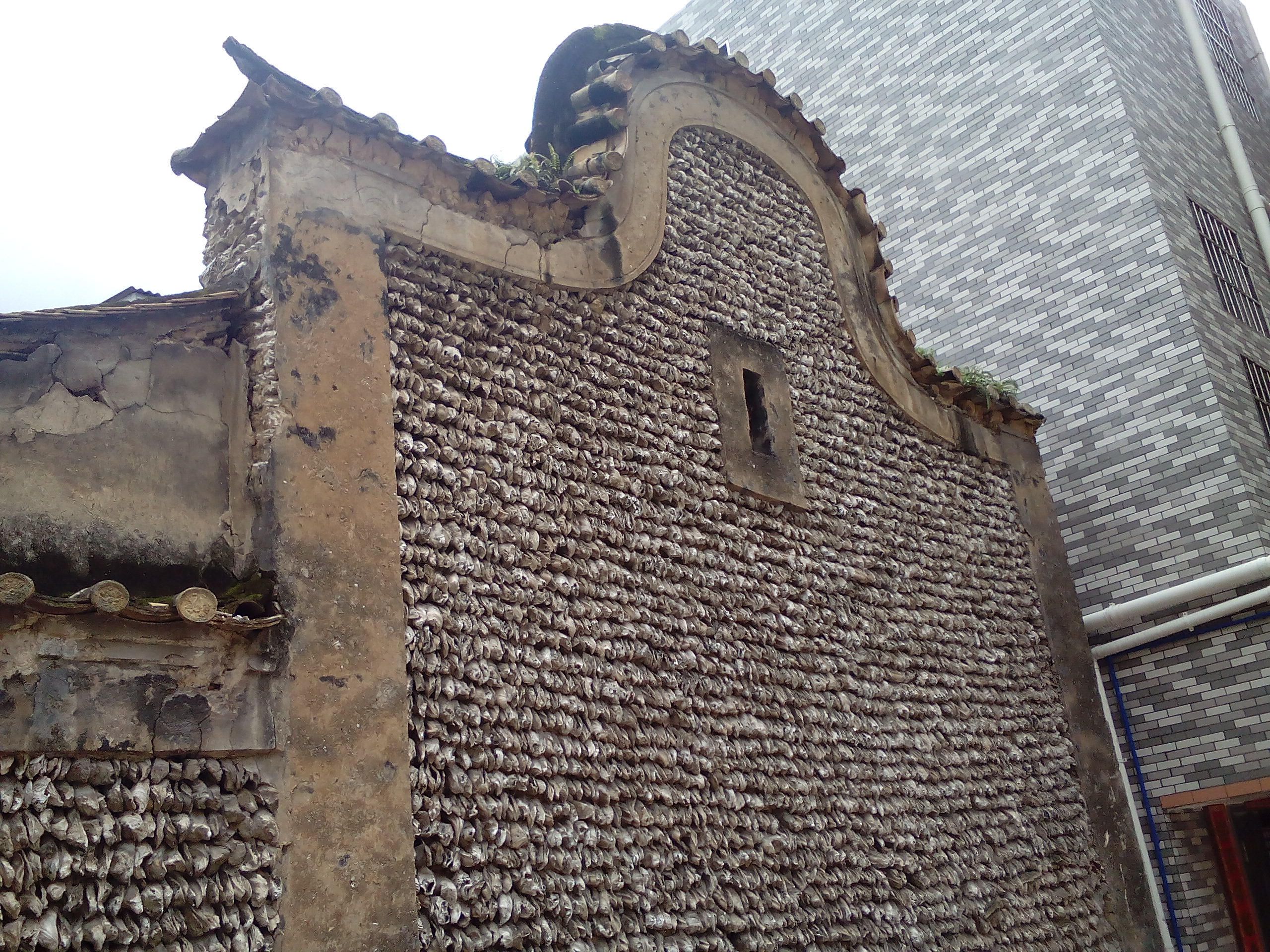
An oyster shell house.

Oyster shell house (Jyutping: Hou^{3} hok^{3} uk^{1}; Traditional Chinese: 蠔殼屋) is an architectural style that arose in Lingnan in late 16th to early 17th century. It arose when certain Cantonese villages started gathering oyster shells from nearby coasts to build homes. It is said that the use of oyster shells helps the building become more resistant to wild changes in temperature, accumulation of rainwater, and insect infestation.

There used to be hundreds of such houses dispersed across Guangdong, but now most have been demolished. Only four of them remain. At present, the Hoizyu district has developed a plan to protect and maintain the remaining oyster shell house. This style is viewed as an indication of the strong "ocean culture" elements in Cantonese culture.

== Tong lau ==
Tong lau (Jyutping: Tong^{4} lau^{4}; Traditional Chinese: 唐樓) is a style of tenement buildings architecture found in Lingnan (and also in some other areas by the South China Sea) starting from 19th century. It is essentially a balcony-type, multi-story tenement building for residential and commercial use, with each story being three to four meters tall, typically built with either green bricks or, later, concrete. The main purpose of tong lau is to let people live upstairs while running some sorts of business (e.g., a pawn shop) downstairs. It has been influenced by European architecture, and arose due to Lingnan's extensive commercial exchanges with Western Europeans since 15th century. This style is thus especially prevalent in regions with more exposure to Western European cultures, such as Hong Kong and Macau.

Tong laus are strongly associated with Hong Kong and frequently appear in the city's movies and soap operas.

=== Tong laus in Lingnan ===
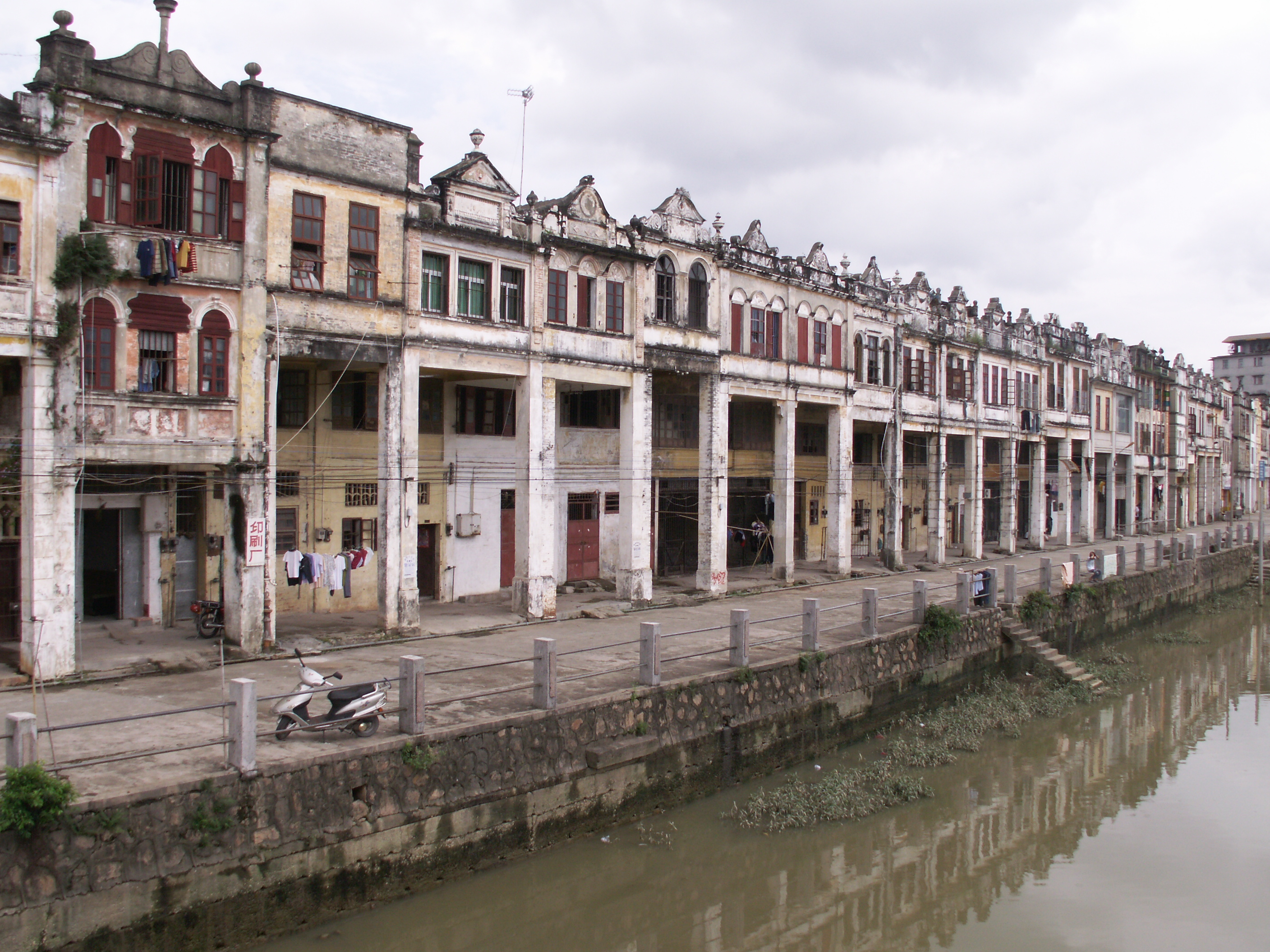
A row of tong laus in Hoiping, Guangdong.

== Lingnan garden ==
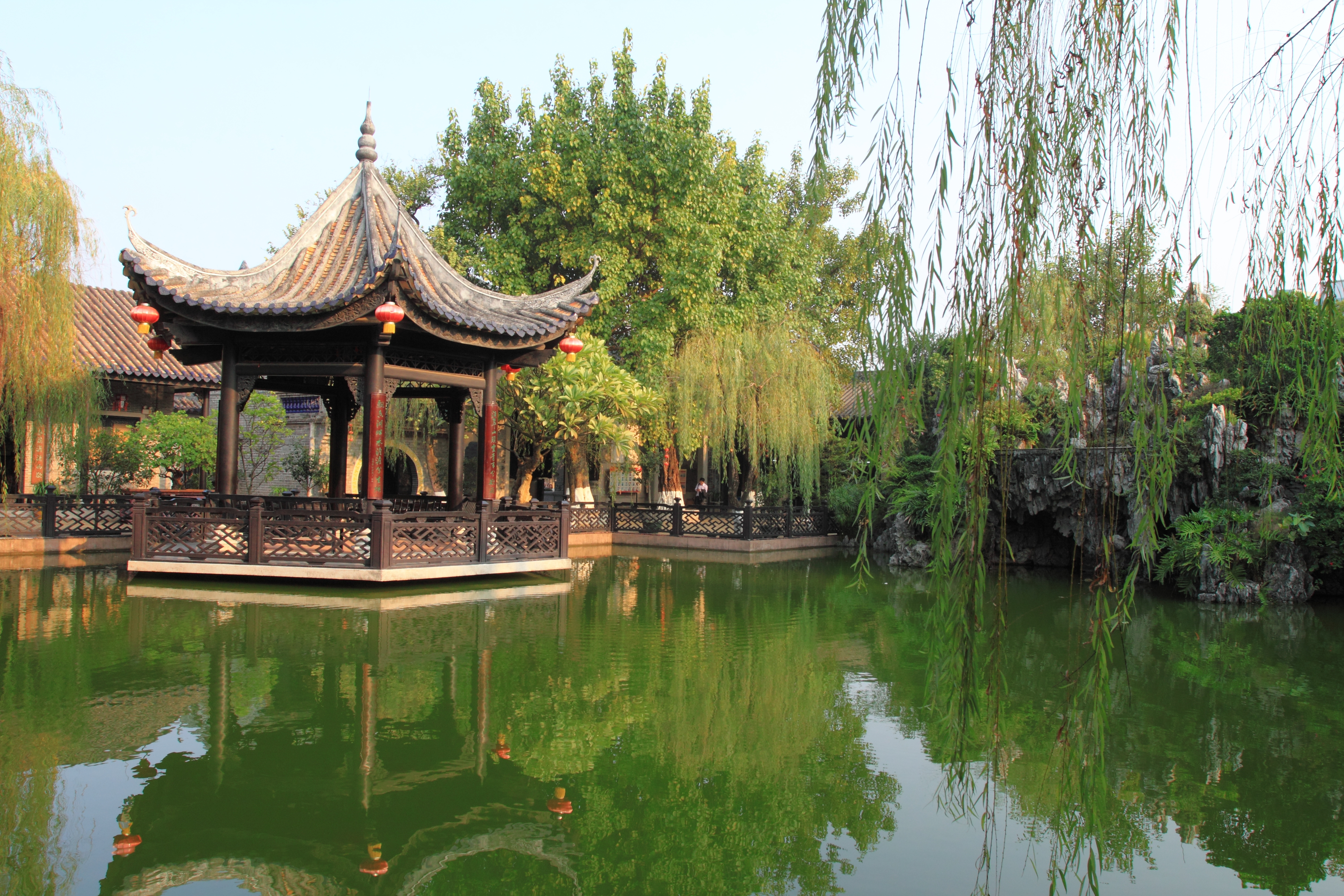
The pond of Yuyum Sanfong.

Lingnan garden (Jyutping: Ling^{5} naam^{5} jyun^{4} lam^{4}; Traditional Chinese: 嶺南園林), or Cantonese garden, is the style of garden design native to the Lingnan region. Geographically, Lingnan has very different climate from China's heartland (i.e., Zhongyuan), resulting in her developing a different style in designing gardens. The most frequently cited traits of Lingnan gardens are: (1) they tend to surround their plants with buildings to provide protection to the plants, due to the frequent rainfalls and storms in the region; (2) Lingnan gardens usually use plant species native to the region, such as red cotton flowers and lychee trees; (3) due to Lingnan being far away from the center of power (i.e., Zhongyuan), gardens in the region have historically been less bounded by royal standards, resulting in a style that leans more towards the common people, e.g., Lingnan gardens are decorated with large amount of handcraft products of local people, ranging from sculptures to porcelains, and also tend to use smaller buildings; (4) as in the case with classical Lingnan architecture, with Cantonese being prolific craftsmen, Lingnan gardens tend to use a large number of relief carvings and sculptures.

Built in early 20th century, Bou Mak Garden (Jyutping: Bou^{2} mak^{6} jyun^{4}; Traditional Chinese: 寶墨園, literally "Garden of Treasure and Ink") is located in Punyu, Guangzhou, and is a fine example of classical Lingnan garden. Once inside, exotic buildings, gardens, hills, lakes, and bridges are found - a place that reveals interplay between nature's art and man-made art in forms of sculptures and edifices, which boast intricate clay, porcelain, brick, wood and stone carving.

Other representative examples of Lingnan gardens would be the "four great gardens of central Canton": Yuyum Sanfong, Leung's Garden, Ching Fai Garden, and Ho Garden.

=== Lingnan gardens ===
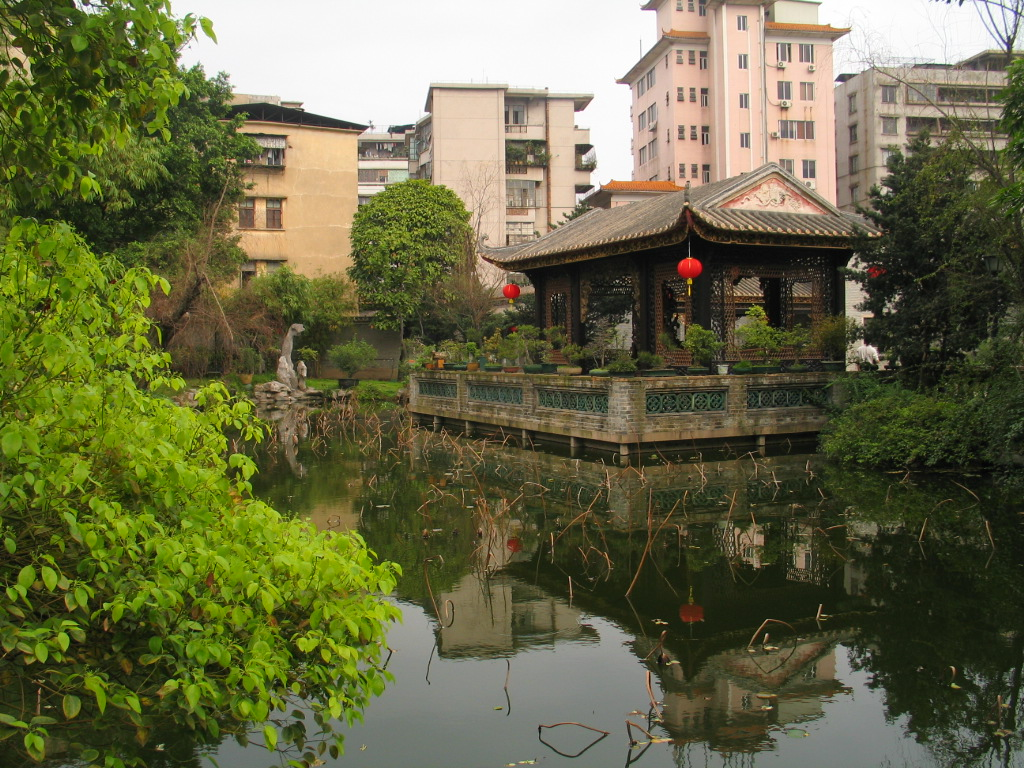
Leung's Garden.

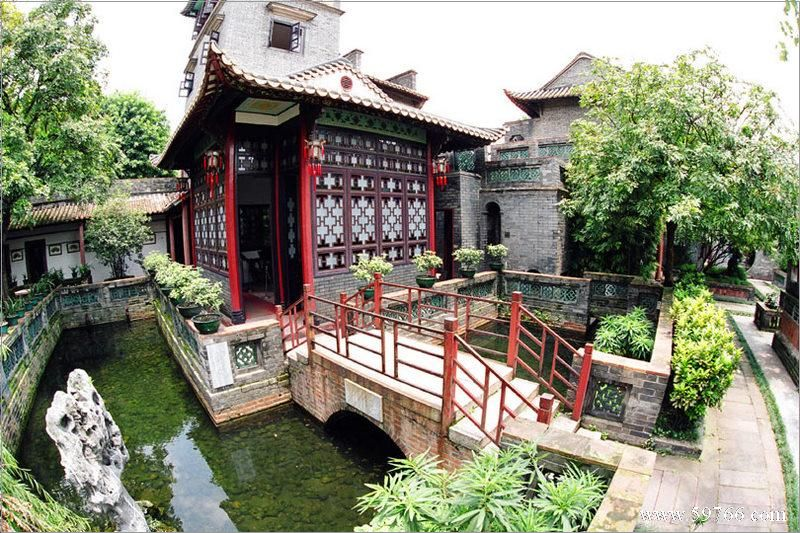
Ho Garden.

== See also ==
- Cantonese culture
- Nanyue
- Shophouse
- Hakka architecture
- Hokkien architecture
- Architecture of Jiangxi
- Chinese architecture
- Chek Gong Tower Pagoda
- Chinese pagoda
