= List of prisons in Guangdong =

Prisons in the Chinese province

This is a list of prisons and detention centres within the Guangdong province of China.

== Guangzhou ==
=== Prisons ===
Name	Name	City/county/district	Village/town	Established	Notes
Guangzhou Prison 广州监狱		Liwan District, Guangzhou,		1980	Has ten prison sections
Panyu Prison 番禺监狱		Panyu District, Guangzhou	Huijiang, Dashi, Panyu	1995	Has 15 prison sections
Conghua Prison 从化监狱		Conghua, Guangzhou		1952	
Huadu Prison 花都监狱		Huadu District, Guangzhou		1952	
Guangdong Juvenile Offender Detachment 广东未成年犯管教所		Baiyun District, Guangzhou			Holds 4,000 prisoners
Guangdong Women's Prison 广东省女子监狱		Baiyun District, Guangzhou	Zhuliao	2003	Holds nearly 5,000 prisoners.
Guangzhou Women's Prison 广州女子监狱		Huadu District, Guangzhou			

=== Detention centres ===
Name	Name in simplified Chinese	City/county/district	Village/town	Established	Notes
Guangdong Detention Center	广东省看守所	Yuexiu District, Guangzhou			
Guangzhou No. 1 Detention Center	广州市第一看守所	Baiyun District, Guangzhou			
Guangzhou No. 2 Detention Center	广州市第二看守所	Zengcheng District, Guangzhou			
Guangzhou No. 3 Detention Center	广州市第三看守所	Baiyun District, Guangzhou			
Guangzhou State Security Bureau Detention Center	广州市国家安全局看守所	Yuexiu District, Guangzhou			
Guangzhou Railway Public Security Department Detention Center	广州市铁路公安处看守所	Yuexiu District, Guangzhou			
Yuexiu Detention Center	越秀区看守所	Yuexiu District, Guangzhou			
Zengcheng Detention Center	增城区看守所	Zengcheng District, Guangzhou			
Tianhe Detention Center	天河区看守所	Tianhe District, Guangzhou			
Baiyun Detention Center	白云区看守所	Baiyun District, Guangzhou			
Conghua Detention Center	从化区看守所	Conghua District, Guangzhou			
Guangzhou Port Detention Center	广州港看守所	Huangpu District, Guangzhou			
Haizhu Detention Center	海珠区看守所	Haizhu District, Guangzhou			
Huadu Detention Center	花都区看守所	Huadu District, Guangzhou			
Huangpu Detention Center	黄埔区看守所	Huangpu District, Guangzhou			
Liwan Detention Center	荔湾区看守所	Liwan District, Guangzhou			
Nansha Detention Center	南沙区看守所	Nansha District, Guangzhou			
Panyu Detention Center	番禺区看守所	Panyu District, Guangzhou			

== Dongguan ==
=== Prisons ===
Name	Name	City/county/district	Village/town	Established	Notes
Dongguan Prison 东莞监狱		Shilong, Guangdong	Shilong	1988	Formerly known as Xinzhou Prison, began detaining foreigners in 1989.

=== Detention centres ===
Name	Name in simplified Chinese	City/county/district	Village/town	Established	Notes
Dongguan Detention Center	东莞市看守所	Dongcheng Subdistrict, Dongguan			
Dongguan No. 2 Detention Center	东莞市第二看守所	Dongcheng Subdistrict, Dongguan			
Dongguan No. 2 Detention Center Branch (Dongguan No. 3 Detention Center)	东莞市第二看守所分所(东莞市第三看守所)	Dalang, Dongguan			

== Qingyuan ==
=== Prisons ===
Name	Name	City/county/district	Village/town	Established	Notes
Qingyuan Prison 清远监狱	Shanhe Sulphur Iron Mine	Qingxin, Qingyuan		1952	

=== Detention centres ===
Name	Name	City/county/district	Village/town	Established	Notes
Qingyuan Detention center清远市看守所(清城区看守所)		Qingcheng, Qingyuan			
Yangshan Detention center阳山县看守所		Yangshan County, Qingyuan			
Lianzhou Detention center连州市看守所		Lianzhou, Qingyuan			
Yingde Detention center英德市看守所		Yingde, Qingyuan			
Fogang Detention center佛冈县看守所		Fogang County, Qingyuan			
Liannan Detention center连南县看守所		Liannan Yao Autonomous County, Qingyuan			
Lianshan Detention center连山县看守所		Lianshan Zhuang and Yao Autonomous County, Qingyuan			
Qingxin Detention center清新区看守所		Qingxin, Qingyuan			

== Other ==
=== Prisons ===
Name	Name	City/county/district	Village/town	Established	Notes
Beijiang Prison	Huanggang Cement Plant			1951	Includes detention facilities at Huanggang, Shanjiao, and Shichang, with 15 sections in total.
Foshan Prison	Fuwan Xijiang Manganese Mine	Gaoming District, Foshan	Fuwan	1958	Originally called Xijiang Mengjiang Laogai Farm
Gaoming Prison	Xi'an Farm			1957	Has 13 sections
Huaiji Prison	Wentang Farm	Huaiji County, Zhaoqing	Wentang	1978	Holds 4,000 prisoners
Jiangmen Prison	Yingding Tea Factory; Minhai Clothing Factory	Jiangmen	Heshan, Guangdong	1951	
Jieyang Prison	Clothing Factory	Jiedong County	Yujiao	1951	Originally known as the Dongjing Labor Reform Detachment. In May 1995, it was renamed Jieyang Prison.
Lechang Prison		Lechang		1951	
Lianping Prison	Lianping Prison Tea Manufacturing Plant	Heyuan, Lianping County	Zhongxin	1972	Has 2 detention centres: Prison Detention Center and Yangtang Detention Center.
Maoming Prison		Huazhou	Shitanchang	1952	
Meizhou Prison	Jiaying Machine Factory			1951	
Pingshi Prison	Luojiadu Coal Mine; Guangbei Tea Farm	Lechang	Pingshi		
Shaoguan Prison	Shaocheng Industrial Plant			1942	Has 12 sections
Shenzhen Prison		Longgang District, Shenzhen	Tiantou, Pingshan,		
Sihui Prison	Sihui City Jiguang tang Farm	Sihui	Jiguangtang		Formerly called Jiguangtang Labor Reform Detachment and Dahuang Reeducation Through Labor, two detention facilities established in Luotang and Jiguang in 1995.
Wujiang Prison	Wujiang Farm; Car Repair Plant	Huanggang		1954	Has 13 sections and includes Dongshan Labor Reform Company
Yangchun Prison		Yangchun	Songbai	1970	
Yangjiang Prison		Yangdong County, Yangjiang	Nalong	1959	
Yingde Prison	Yingde Tea Farm	Yingde	Yunling	1952	

=== Detention centres ===
Name	Name in simplified Chinese	City/county/district	Village/town	Established	Notes
Bao'an District Detention Centre	宝安区看守所	Bao'an District, Shenzhen			
Futian District Detention Centre	福田区拘留所	Futian District, Shenzhen			
Longgang District Detention Centre	龙岗区拘留所	Longgang District, Shenzhen			
Luohu District Detention Centre	罗湖区拘留所	Luohu District, Shenzhen			
Nanshan District Detention Centre	南山区拘留所	Nanshan District, Shenzhen			
Shenzhen Municipal Detention Centre	深圳市拘留所	Nanshan District, Shenzhen			
Yantian District Detention Centre	盐田区拘留所	Yantian District, Shenzhen			
Zhongshan Municipal Detention Centre		Nanqu Subdistrict, Zhongshan	Maling		

== See also ==
- Penal system in China
