= Pingshi =

Pingshi may refer:

== Places ==
- Pingshi, Lechang (坪石镇), Guangdong, China
- Pingshi, Tongbai County (平氏镇), in Tongbai County, Henan

== Works ==
- Pingshi, a Ming dynasty treatise on flower arrangement.
