= Guangzhou Women's Prison =

Prison in China

- Location within Guangdong Guangzhou Women's Prison (China)
- Location: No. 1 Butou Avenue, Butou Village, Tanbu Town, Huadu District, Guangzhou City; 23.326556°N 113.108306°E
- Status: Operational
- Opened: May 1974
- Managed by: Guangdong Prison Administrative Bureau

Guangzhou Women's Prison
- Simplified Chinese: 广州女子监狱
- Traditional Chinese: 廣州女子監獄
Transcriptions

Guangzhou Women's Prison (Chinese: 广州女子监狱) has changed its name multiple times; it was formerly known as the Guangzhou No. 2 Reeducation-Through-Labor camp and the Tanbu Compulsory Drug Rehabilitation Center.

== History ==
In 1955, the reeducation through labor system in Guangzhou began following a directive issued by the Central Committee of the Chinese Communist Party under the leadership of Mao Zedong, titled “Instructions on Thoroughly Eliminating Hidden Counterrevolutionaries”.

In 1962, a reeducation unit was established at the Chini Xinsheng Quarry (赤坭新生石矿场) in Huadu District, marking the origin of what would later be known as Guangzhou Chini No. 1 Reeducation-Through-Labor Camp.

In 1968, most staff were reassigned to cadre training camps, and by the end of that year, the laojiao system in Guangzhou was temporarily suspended.

In December 1971, the Guangdong Revolutionary Committee ordered the resumption of reeducation-through-labor.

By 1982, following national regulations, all labor camps were officially renamed, and the Chini facility became known as the Guangzhou Chini No. 1 Reeducation-Through-Labor Camp (广州赤坭第一劳教所).

By 1990, Chini No. 1 Reeducation-Through-Labor Camp became part of a broader network of laojiao institutions including Chini No. 2 RTL and No. 3 RTL, and other camps across the city. The Guangzhou Laojiao system included seven reeducation camps and a juvenile school.

In 2013，Guangzhou No. 2 Reeducation-Through-Labor camp was renamed the Guangzhou Tanbu Compulsory Drug Rehabilitation Center.

In 2014, the drug rehabilitation center was converted into a municipal women's prison.

== See also ==
- List of prisons in Guangdong
- List of re-education through labor camps in China
- Guangzhou No. 1 Detention Center
