= Foshan Prison =

Prison in Foshan, Guangdong, China

Coordinates: 22.9650°N 112.8620°E

Foshan Prison (Chinese: 佛山监狱; pinyin: Fóshān jiānyù) is a prison in the Gaoming District of Foshan City, Guangdong Province, China. It was established as Xijiang Mengjiang Laogai Farm in 1958, and renamed Foshan Prison in 1995. Its inmates once mined ore at the adjacent Fuwan Xijiang Manganese Mine (富湾西江锰矿), whose deposits are now exhausted. They now produce rattan and wool goods.

== See also ==
Other prisons in Guangdong:

- Jiangmen Prison
- Panyu Prison
- Gaoming Prison
- Jiaoling Prison
- Lianping Prison
