= Huadu Prison =

Prison in China

Guangdong Province Guangzhou Huadu Prison (广东省广州花都监狱)
- Location within Guangdong Huadu Prison (China)
- Location: 2 Hexihu Road, Chini Town, Huadu District, Guangzhou, China; 23.367178°N 113.056156°E
- Status: Operational
- Opened: 1952 (original establishment)
- Managed by: Guangzhou Municipal Justice Bureau; Guangdong Prison Administrative Bureau
- Warden: Liu Wenzheng
- Website: http://hdjy.gd.gov.cn/

Huadu Prison
- Simplified Chinese: 花都监狱
- Traditional Chinese: 花都監獄
Transcriptions

Guangdong Province Guangzhou Huadu Prison (Chinese: 广东省广州花都监狱), more commonly known as Huadu Prison (花都监狱) is a prison in Guangdong Province. It is located in 2 Hexihu Road, Chini Town of Huadu district, Guangzhou. It is under the dual administration of the Guangzhou Municipal Justice Bureau and Guangdong Prison Administrative Bureau.

== History ==
In April 1952, the Guangzhou Municipal Public Security Bureau Laogai Division's 5th Team (广州市公安局劳改处第五大队), also known as the Xinshengshi Quarry (新生石矿场) was established by the Guangzhou Municipal People's Government for mining purposes.

In 1984, Xinshengshi Quarry was renamed to Guangzhou 1st Re-education-Through-Labor Facility (Chinese: 广州市第一劳动教养管理所) during justice system reforms, and was handed to the Guangzhou Municipal Justice Bureau.

On February 1, 2005, during Laogai abolishment efforts, the Guangzhou 1st RTL facility added the name of Guangzhou 2nd Detention Center (广州市第二看守所), with the goal to gradually convert it into a prison.

The project of conversion into a prison was approved by the Guangzhou Municipal Government in July 2010, with the construction project beginning in August 2012. The Guangzhou 1st RTL facility was officially renamed to Guangzhou Municipal Prison (广州市监狱) on January 10, 2013. It was then renamed again to Guangdong Province Huadu Prison (广东省花都监狱) on September 18, 2013.

The conversion project was completed in April 2016 with the new prison being operational. On June 6, 2016, the prison was renamed to its current name, Guangdong Province Guangzhou Huadu Prison (广东省广州花都监狱).

== SWAT team ==
On June 1, 2018, the Huadu Prison SWAT team (花都监狱特警队), nicknamed the "Cheetah Commando Unit" (猎豹突击队) was established for the prison to have emergency response capabilities. As of January 2019, it consists of 1 team leader, 6 sworn officers and 12 auxiliary officers; its roles include riot control, security during open days along with escorting prisoners who are granted temporary leave for medical attention.

== Structure ==
As of July 2025, the leadership structure of Huadu Prison is as follows:

- Warden, Party Committee Secretary: Liu Wenzheng (刘文争), Commissioner 3rd Class
- Prison Commissar, Deputy Party Committee Secretary: Wu Guohui (邬国辉), Commissioner 3rd Class
- Discipline Inspection Secretary: Zou Zhenghui (邹征辉), Supervisor 1st Class
- Deputy wardens:
  - Xu Jishi (许计实), Supervisor 1st Class
  - Zhang Chaoyun (张超云), Supervisor 1st Class
  - Wang Jian (王健), Supervisor 3rd Class

== Awards ==
Huadu Prison received the honorary title of "Praised Unit" from the Guangdong Prison Administrative Bureau multiple times.

== See also ==
- List of prisons in Guangdong
