= Foshan Gaoming International Airport =

Future airport to serve Foshan, Guangdong, China

Foshan Gaoming International Airport 佛山高明国际机场
- IATA: none; ICAO: none

Summary
- Airport type: Public
- Operator: Guangdong Airport Group Foshan Gaoming Airport Co., Ltd.
- Serves: Pearl River Delta
- Location: Gaoming district, Foshan, Guangdong, China
- Elevation AMSL: 16 m (52 ft)
- Coordinates: 22°52′55″N 112°34′27″E

Map
- Location in Guangdong Location in China

Runways
Direction	Length		Surface
Direction	m	ft	Surface
	3,800	12,467	Concrete
	3,600	11,811	Concrete

Foshan Gaoming International Airport
- Simplified Chinese: 佛山高明国际机场
- Traditional Chinese: 佛山高明國際機場
- Cantonese Yale: Fahtsāan Gōumìhng gwokjai gēichèuhng
Transcriptions
Standard Mandarin
- Hanyu Pinyin: Fóshān Gāomíng guójì jīchǎng
Yue: Cantonese
- Yale Romanization: Fahtsāan Gōumìhng gwokjai gēichèuhng
- Jyutping: fat6 saan1 gou1 ming4 gwok3 zai3 gei1 coeng4

Foshan Gaoming International Airport (Chinese: 佛山高明国际机场) or Pearl River Delta Hub (Guangzhou's New) Airport (Chinese: 珠三角枢纽（广州新）机场), is an international airport under construction in the Gaoming district of Foshan, approximately 75 kilometres (47 mi) southwest of Guangzhou city centre.

Construction officially started on March 25, 2026. The airport is built to relieve pressure on Guangzhou Baiyun International Airport and enhance connectivity in the western Pearl River Delta. The Airport is designated to serve 30 million passengers annually by 2030, and eventually increasing to 60 million by 2050, including a third runway.

== History ==
In 2013, Foshan, together with other cities on the west bank of the Pearl River Delta like Zhaoqing, Yunfu and Jiangmen proposed building a new airport on the west bank of the Pearl River, since Foshan Shadi Airport was a joint civil and military airport and had limited space to expand.

In 2016, the Pearl River Delta New Airport project was officially approved and included as a key construction project of Guangdong province's 13th 5-year plan, positioned as "forming an international aviation hub together with Guangzhou Baiyun International Airport", mainly serving the central and western Pearl River Delta and surrounding areas, and the location was chosen in the Gaoming district, near the border between Foshan and Zhaoqing.

In March 2024, Foshan issued the a plan that "focuses on the airport economy, regional coordination, and high-quality development." The completion of the Pearl River Delta International Airport will undoubtedly bring historic development opportunities to Gaoming, helping it to become a modern industrial hub in western Foshan and a new and important engine for Foshan's economic development.

On December 19, 2024, a conference for the airport investment was held in Gaoming. The conference promoted Gaoming District's investment environment and held a signing ceremony for key industrial projects, with a total investment of approximately 50 billion RMB. Among them, China Southern Airlines will construct projects covering plane manufacturing, airport logistics, and aviation catering at the new Foshan airport, with a total investment exceeding 2 billion RMB, fully ushering in a new era of airport-based economy for Gaoming District.

The new airport is located approximately 55 kilometres (34 miles) southwest of Foshan City centre and 94 kilometres (58 miles) away from Guangzhou Baiyun International Airport. It will replace the existing Foshan Shadi Airport and operate as another airport for Guangzhou and Foshan with the existing Guangzhou Baiyun International Airport continuing to operate. Gaoming Airport aims to serve as a domestic and regional international airport hub, relieving Baiyun Airport's pressure and will be one of the world-class aviation hubs in the Guangdong-Hong Kong-Macao Greater Bay Area. It directly serves the population of more than 20 million people in Guangzhou, Foshan, Zhaoqing and surrounding cities, reducing the need for residents in nearby cities like Yunfu, Zhaoqing and Yangjiang travel all the way to Guangzhou for air travel and improving the comprehensive transportation system in the western part of the Greater Bay Area. While Baiyun Airport will continue to focus on global routes and strengthen its position as an international gateway hub to Mainland China and Gaoming Airport will accept more domestic flights from Baiyun Airport.

The airline bases of the airport in first phase include China Southern Airlines and China United Airlines. China Southern Airlines base to undertake 50% of the business volume of the new airport as the stationing positioning, overall planning of maintenance, cargo logistics, aviation catering, production auxiliary four functional areas, it is expected that by the target year of this period, China Southern Airlines will achieve 15 million passenger throughput and 250,000 tons of cargo and mail throughput. China United Airlines base is positioned to undertake 30% of the new airport's business volume, and plans business support capabilities such as cargo logistics, maintenance, ground services, and production auxiliary facilities. It is expected that by the current target year, China United Airlines will achieve a passenger throughput of 9 million passengers and a cargo and mail throughput of 100,000 tons.

Here are some key points announced from construction event on 25 March 2026:

- 26 December 2025: Feasibility study report approved;
- 25 March 2026: Construction of new Gaoming Airport is officially begins (total construction period approximately 60 months);
- 30 September 2026: Commencement of all earthwork projects;
- 31 January 2027: The main structure of the terminal begins construction;
- 30 June 2029: The main structure of new terminal is completed;
- 30 June 2030: The flight area project is fully completed, and the terminal building project is fully completed.

== Construction ==
The new airport covers more than 463.7 hectares of total area. The first phase of the project officially started construction on 25 March 2026 with total investment of 41.808 billion RMB (including 35.909 billion RMB for the airport project) with total construction time approximately 60 months has two class 4E parallel runways each spanning 3,600 meters long and 2,000 meters apart which are able to handle almost aircraft models such as Boeing 747, Airbus A340, Boeing 787, Boeing 777, Airbus A330; a terminal with a construction area of about 260,000 square meters designed to handle 1 million international passengers and 19 million domestic passengers, with four floors above ground and one floor underground which connected to a comprehensive transportation hub. It has 94 aircraft stands and corresponding supporting facilities, can meet the needs of handling 30 million passengers annually, 500,000 tons of cargo and mail and 260,000 aircraft takeoffs and landings annually in the near-term planning target year of 2035. The long-term planning target year by 2050 is upgraded to three runway class 4F and two terminals cover 27 square kilometers planned area to meet the needs of 60-80 million passengers, 2 million tons of cargo throughput.

Once the airport opened and put into operation in June 2030 during the "15th Five-Year Plan" period, the new Gaoming airport will become one of the three major international aviation hub airports in the province's "3+4+8" transport airport layout (the two others is Shenzhen Bao'an International Airport and Guangzhou Baiyun International Airport) and Guangzhou is the fourth city in Mainland China to have 2 civil airports in operation after Beijing, Chengdu and Shanghai.

The Guangzhou–Zhanjiang high-speed railway will have an intermediate stop at the airport.
