= Guangzhou No. 1 Detention Center =

Prison in China

- Location within Guangdong Guangzhou No. 1 Detention Center (China)
- Location: No. 9 Shi Gang Bei Jie, Chatou, Guanghai Road, Baiyun District, Guangzhou, Guangdong; 23.192256°N 113.217558°E
- Status: Operational
- Managed by: Guangdong Prison Administrative Bureau

Guangzhou No. 1 Detention Center
- Simplified Chinese: 广州第一看守所
- Traditional Chinese: 廣州第一看守所
Transcriptions

Guangzhou No. 1 Detention Center (Chinese: 广州第一看守所) includes the Women's Detention Center. It was originally located at 9 Shigang North St., Guanghai Rd., Chatou, Baiyun District, Guangzhou. 广州市白云区槎头广海路狮岗北街9号 It also used to be the former Baiyun Detention Center. The new address after relocation is on 广州市白云区太和镇谢家庄村粪箕窝朝亮北路 Chaoliang North Road in Xiejiazhuang Village, Taihe Town, Baiyun District, Guangzhou. Coordinate 23.306583°N 113.366861°E

== Organizational Structure ==
The total construction area of the prison is approximately 94,816 square meters. The main facilities include: housing for detainees, offices and administrative areas for case handling, residential and administrative buildings for police officers, buildings for the procuratorate and court, auxiliary facilities, accommodations for the armed police, an outdoor training ground for the armed police, an outdoor parking lot, guard towers, and the perimeter wall of the prison area.

== Notable Inmates ==
- Chen Bangchao (Chinese: 陈邦超) A dissident during the 2022 COVID-19 protests in China.
- Sophia Huang Xueqin (Chinese: 黃雪琴) - Women's rights activist.
- Wang Jianbing (Chinese: 王建兵) - Labour activist.
- Guo Feixiong (Chinese: 郭飞雄) - Human rights lawyer.
- Tang Jingling (Chinese: 唐荆陵) - Lawyer and civil rights defender.
- Zeng Feiyang (Chinese: 曾飞洋) - The director of the labor NGO 'Panyu Migrant Workers Center'.
- Wang Qingying (Chinese: 王清营) - Rights activist.

== See also ==
- List of prisons in Guangdong
- Inciting subversion of state power
- MeToo movement
- 2022 COVID-19 protests in China
