= Fuyang Airport =

Fuyang Airport 阜阳机场
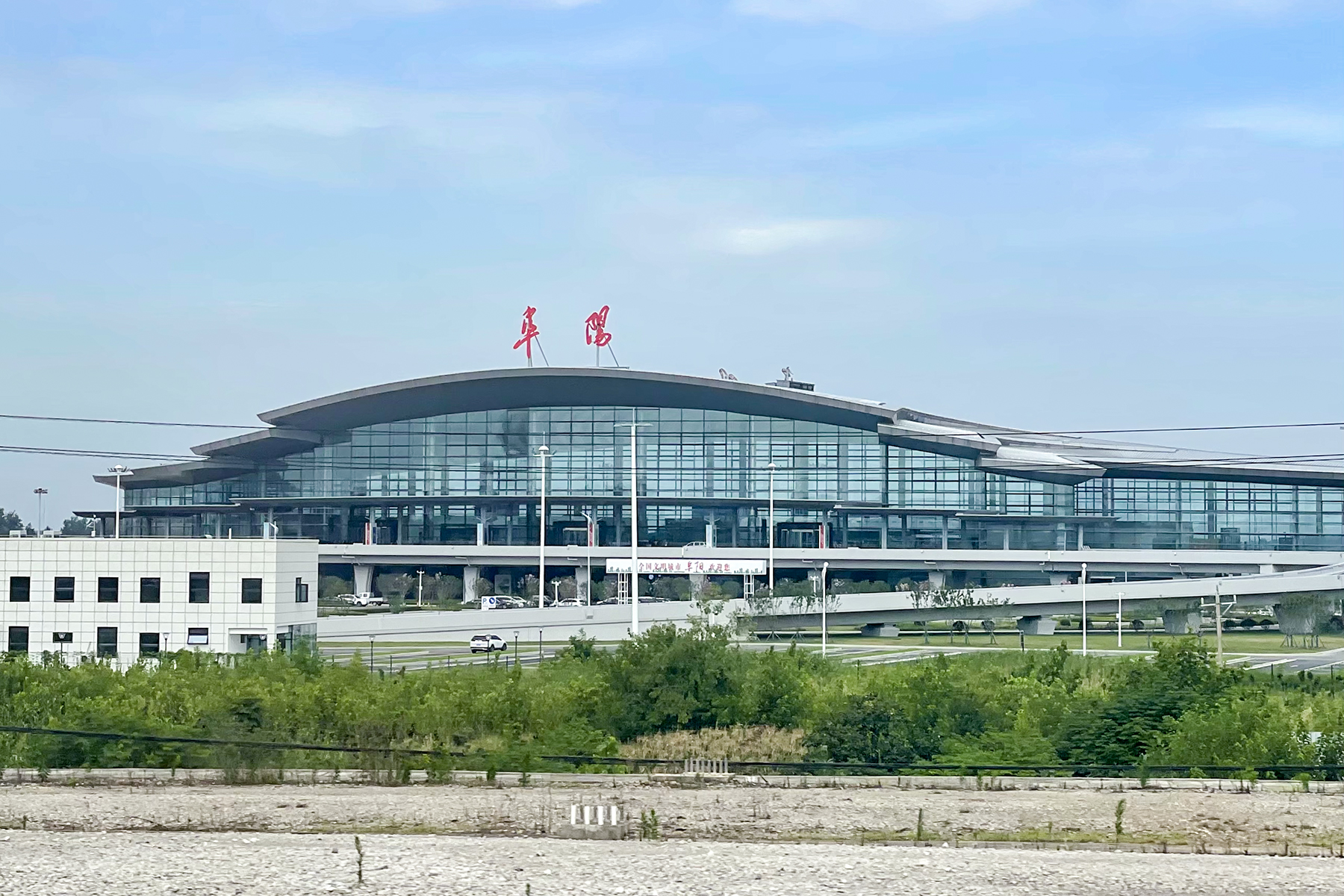
- IATA: FUG; ICAO: ZSFY

Summary
- Airport type: Public
- Location: Fuyang, Anhui, China
- Opened: Part 1: 26 December 1998; 27 years ago; Part 2: 13 November 2007; 18 years ago
- Closed: Part 1: 21 November 2004
- Coordinates: 32°52′55″N 115°44′4″E

Map
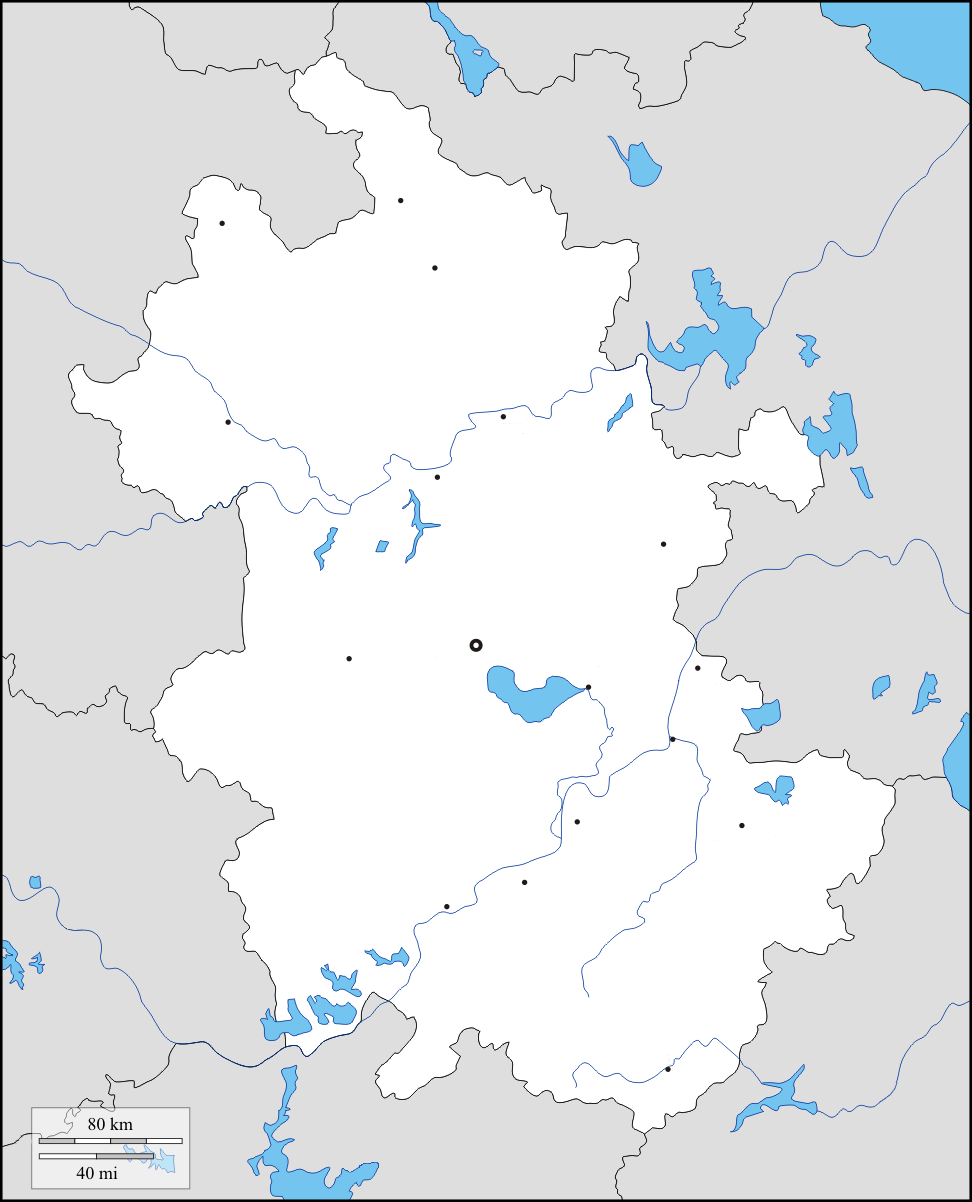
- Location of airport in Anhui

Runways
| Direction | Length | | Surface |
| Direction | m | ft | Surface |
|---|---|---|---|
| 03/21 | 2,400 | 7,874 | Concrete |

Statistics (2025)
- Passengers: 1,021,934 ▼19.6%
- Aircraft movements: 16,473 ▼14.1%
- Cargo (metric tons): 1,213.5 ▼61.7%
- Sources: China's busiest airports by passenger traffic, CAAC

Fuyang Airport
- Simplified Chinese: 阜阳机场
- Traditional Chinese: 阜陽機場
Transcriptions
Standard Mandarin
- Hanyu Pinyin: Fùyáng Jīchǎng

Fuyang Airport (IATA: FUG, ICAO: ZSFY), also called Fuyang Xiguan Airport, is an airport serving the city of Fuyang in Anhui Province, China.

== History ==
In August 1935, Fuyang Jiuligou Airport was built in the south of Fuyang City. After the outbreak of the Second Sino-Japanese War, Jiuligou Airport was abandoned because of its proximity to Bengbu Airport.

In the spring of 1942, Fuyang Xiguan Airport was built southwest of Fuyang City. In 1961, the airport was expanded to a total area of 233,000 square meters.

In June 1992, Fuyang planned construction of a new airport. The new airport would be located in the southwest of Fuyang City, 8.5 km from the city center at that time. In the name of "relocation and expansion", the Fuyang New Airport was completed in early 1994. The first flight was made on December 26, 1998.

The construction of the new airport was controversial as it was instigated by a corrupt official. The construction costs of the airport are reported to be 390 million Yuan, but in 2002, only 920 passengers travelled through the airport.

In 2003 the airport stopped operating due to the SARS outbreak. On November 21, 2004, as a result of pending investigations on China Eastern Airlines Flight 5210, involving the crash of a small jet at Baotou Airport, flights at Fuyang Airport were suspended for nearly three years. On November 13, 2007, the airport officially resumed operation, starting with the Fuyang-Hefei-Shanghai round-trip route.

In 2017 the airport was expanded, a new terminal was built and the runway was extended by 400 m to 2,400 m.

== Airlines and destinations ==
| Airlines | Destinations |
|---|---|
| Air China | Beijing–Capital, Chengdu–Shuangliu |
| China Eastern Airlines | Kunming, Shanghai–Pudong |
| China Southern Airlines | Guangzhou, Shenzhen |
| China United Airlines | Foshan |
| Colorful Guizhou Airlines | Guiyang |
| GX Airlines | Dalian, Nanning |
| Urumqi Air | Haikou, Urumqi |
| West Air | Chongqing, Zhoushan |

== See also ==
- List of airports in China
- List of the busiest airports in China
