= Gaoming Prison =

Prison in Guangdong, China

Coordinates: 22.9252°N 112.8325°E

Gaoming Prison (Chinese: 高明监狱; pinyin: Gāomíng Jiānyù) is a prison in the Hecheng Subdistrict (荷城街道) of the Gaoming District, Foshan City, Guangdong Province, China. Established in 1957, prisoners work on the adjacent Xi'an Farm (西安农场).

== See also ==
Other prisons in Guangdong:

- Jiangmen Prison
- Foshan Prison
- Panyu Prison
- Jiaoling Prison
- Lianping Prison
