= Jiaoling Prison =

Prison in Guangdong, China

Coordinates: 24.3163°N 116.1030°E

Jiaoling Prison is a prison in Meizhou City, Guangdong Province, China. Jiaoling Prison was established in 1963. Industrial production takes place in this prison.

== See also ==
Other prisons in Guangdong:

- Jiangmen Prison
- Gaoming Prison
- Panyu Prison
- Foshan Prison
- Lianping Prison
