= Jiangmen Prison =

Prison in Guangdong, China

Coordinates: 22.59151°N 112.66925°E

Jiangmen Prison (Chinese: 江门监狱; pinyin: Jiāngmén jiānyù) is a prison in the Jiangmen District of the county-level city of Heshan in Jiangmen City, Guangdong Province, China. Established in 1951, inmates work at the nearby Yingding Tea Factory (营顶茶场) and Minhai Clothing Factory (皿海服装厂).

== See also ==
Other prisons in Guangdong:

- Panyu Prison
- Foshan Prison
- Gaoming Prison
- Jiaoling Prison
- Lianping Prison
