= Pingshi Prison =

Prison in Guangdong, China

Coordinates: 25.2834°N 113.0635°E

Pingshi Prison (simplified Chinese: 坪石监狱; traditional Chinese: 坪石監獄; pinyin: Píngshí Jiānyù) is a prison outside Pingshi Town, Lechang City, Guangdong Province, People's Republic of China connected to the Guangbei Tea Farm (广北茶场).

The prison was established in 1955 and has been associated with the Luojiadu Coal Mine (罗家渡煤矿) for decades.

== See also ==
- List of prisons in Guangdong
