= Lianping Prison =

Prison in Guangdong, China

Lianping Prison (Chinese: 连平监狱; pinyin: Liánpíng Jiānyù) is a prison in Guangdong province, China, situated in Zhongxin town, Lianping County. It was established as Huiyang Region Liantang Laogai Farm in 1972. It is a large-scale prison where prisoners work in the nearby Lianping Prison Tea Manufacturing Plant (连平监狱制茶厂).

== See also ==
- Foshan Prison
- Panyu Prison
- Jiangmen Prison
- Gaoming Prison
- Jiaoling Prison
