= Huang Xueqin =

Chinese independent journalist and women's rights activist

Huang Xueqin (Chinese: 黃雪琴; pinyin: Huáng Xuěqín; born 1988), also known as Sophia Huang Xueqin, is a Chinese #MeToo activist, women's rights activist, and independent journalist. Before working as an independent journalist, Huang served as an investigative journalist for several newspapers in Guangzhou, China. In September 2021, she and another activist, Wang Jianbing (Chinese: 王建兵), disappeared and were believed to have been detained on charges of subversion of state power. In 2022, she received the Wallis Annenberg Justice for Women Journalists Award from the International Women's Media Foundation (IWMF), given to a journalist who is unjustly imprisoned. In June 2024, Huang was sentenced to five years in prison after having been found guilty of subverting state power, while Wang was sentenced to three and a half years.

== Career ==
=== Sexual harassment report on Chinese female journalists ===
In October 2017, Huang initiated a survey on Chinese female journalists' experiences on sexual harassment and collected 416 answers. On March 7, 2018, based on this survey, a Sexual Harassment Report on Chinese Women Journalists were released. According to the report, over 80% of women journalists had experience of being sexually harassed, 42.2% of women journalists who participated in the survey experienced sexual harassment more than one time.

=== #MeToo in China ===
==== Beihang University Incident ====
In October 2017, sexual harassment survivor, Beihang University Ph.D. graduate, Luo Xixi reported anonymously to the university that her former Ph.D. advisor, "Changjiang Scholar" Chen Xiaowu had been harassing his graduate students for years. However, the university did not respond to her report. Meanwhile, she saw Huang's survey on Chinese women Journalists' experience on sexual harassment, and sought help from Huang. They created an alliance called "Hard Candy" and exposed Chen Xiaowu's behaviors on January 1, 2018, on Weibo and received more than three million views within a day. In response, the university revoked Chen Xiaowu's teaching credentials, while the Ministry of Education revoked his "Changjiang Scholar" title. This marked the start of China's #MeToo movement.

Subsequently, Huang started several campaigns to support many #MeToo survivors.

=== Detention in 2019 ===
On June 9, 2019, Huang participated in a protest against the 2019 Hong Kong extradition bill, and wrote about her experience on the platform Matters. On June 11, she posted on her social media and stated that Guangzhou police harassed her because of her writing the article about Hong Kong protesters. She said her parents were "terrified". Subsequently, in October 2019, Guangzhou police arrested her in the name of "Picking quarrels and provoking trouble". On January 17, 2020, Huang was released on bail.

=== Detention in 2021 ===
On September 19, 2021, Huang and workers' rights advocate Wang Jianbing went missing and subsequently lost contact in Guangzhou. Huang was due to start her study in development studies at the University of Sussex after receiving a Chevening Scholarship, and Wang was accompanying her before her planned flight. A human rights organisation said that a person familiar with the matter has stated that Wang and Huang may be detained for investigation on charges of inciting subversion of state power, which involved daily gatherings of friends at Wang's home. In November 2021, it was confirmed that have been arrested and their families have received arrest notices issued by the Guangzhou Public Security Bureau. The notice stated that they were arrested by the Guangzhou Public Security Bureau on suspicion of inciting subversion of state power' and were now being held in the Guangzhou No. 1 Detention Center (Chinese: 广州市第一看守所).

According to a group of supporters of Huang and Wang, the two were formally indicted for subversion as of September 2023. The screenshots which the group published suggested that Huang was accused of "publishing distorted, provocative articles and speeches attacking the national government on social media", and "gathering overseas organisers to participate in online training for 'non-violent actions'". Huang's health had earlier been believed to have deteriorated in detention.

In June 2024, Huang was reported by a support group to have been sentenced to five years in prison after having been found guilty of subverting state power. Wang was sentenced to three and a half years. The support group stated that Huang planned to appeal.
