= Baiyun Detention Center =

Prison in China

- Location within Guangdong Baiyun Detention Center (China)
- Location: Kangduling, Wulonggang, Zhongluotan, Baiyun District, Guangzhou, Guangdong; 23.378933°N 113.421692°E
- Status: Operational
- Opened: May 1974
- Managed by: Guangdong Prison Administrative Bureau

Baiyun Detention Center
- Simplified Chinese: 白云区看守所
- Traditional Chinese: 白雲區看守所
Transcriptions

Baiyun Detention Center (Chinese: 白云区看守所)

== Overview ==
The original Baiyun District Detention Center, located in No.171, XizhouZhongLu, Chatou, Songzhou, Baiyun District, was outdated and severely overcrowded.

On March 20, 2012, the new detention facility was relocated to Wulonggang, Zhongluotan Town, Baiyun District.

In 2025, the prison was expanded again.

== Inmates ==
The Baiyun District Detention Center in Guangzhou primarily holds criminal suspects, short-term convicts, and occasionally individuals involved in politically sensitive cases. It also detains foreign nationals accused of crimes or national security offenses. Inmates are usually held before trial or during investigation, with some serving short sentences. Political detainees and foreigners may face stricter conditions and limited access to legal or consular support.

== Organizational Structure ==
The main construction components include detention cell blocks, a visitation building, supporting office spaces, and training grounds. The total construction area comprises: Building 1 – Administrative Office Building: 5 stories above ground, total area of 4,917.88 square meters. Building 2 – Intake and Visitation Building: 2 stories above ground, total area of 2,395.14 square meters. Building 3 – Detention Housing Building: 4 stories above ground, total area of 13,965.69 square meters. Building 4 – Power Supply Building: 2 stories above ground, total area of 369 square meters.

== Controversies ==
The prison has been accused by former inmates of being forced to assemble Christmas lights and other goods without compensation. Work was enforced under the threat of physical punishment, often carried out not by guards but by designated inmates known as "cell bosses" or "the regime."

== Notable Inmates ==
- Stuart Foster -American sociology professor; detained for eight months in 2013 for theft.
- Tang Jingling(Chinese: 唐荆陵) - Human rights lawyer.
- Wang Qingying(Chinese: 王清营) - Activist and college instructor.
- Yuan Xinting(Chinese: 袁新亭) - Activist.

== See also ==
- List of prisons in Guangdong
