= Dongguan Prison =

Prison in Guangdong, China

- Location within Guangdong Province
- Location: Xinzhou, Shilong, Dongguan City, Guangdong Province; 23.1294°N 113.7969°E
- Status: Operational
- Population: Approx. 5,000 (2013)
- Opened: 1988
- Managed by: Guangdong Prison Administrative Bureau

Dongguan Prison
- Simplified Chinese: 东莞监狱
- Traditional Chinese: 東莞監獄
Transcriptions
Standard Mandarin
- Hanyu Pinyin: Dōngguǎn Jiānyù
Yue: Cantonese
- Jyutping: Dung1 gun2 gaam1 juk6

Dongguan Prison (Chinese: 东莞监狱) is located in the Shilong area of Dongguan, Guangdong, China.

== History ==
According to the Laogai Research Foundation, the Dongguan Prison opened in November 1988 as Shilong Prison, and was given its present name in 1995.

The prison complex was expanded in the subsequent decades, so that it now occupies most of Xinzhou (新洲), an island in the East River upon which the prison is situated.

== Inmate population ==
According to a July 2013 report, the prison received its first foreign inmate in 1996. It holds more than 5,000 inmates from 53 countries, including nearly 500 foreign nationals and some stateless individuals.

Including but not limited to Pakistan, Iran, Uganda, Nepal, Singapore, Hong Kong, Nigeria, Taiwan, New Zealand, Germany, Philippines, Thailand, Malaysia, Ghana, Macau, Nepal, Egypt, Russia.

== Living conditions and forced labour ==
Prisoners at Dongguan Prison are reportedly forced to work manufacturing goods, and are allegedly routinely beaten. In 2013, former inmates told The Australian Financial Review that they were forced to make disposable headphones sold to major airlines for the equivalent of around £0.85 per month. They said they were beaten, tasered, or put in solitary confinement for failing to achieve production targets.

Similarly, Der Spiegel interviewed several ex-inmates of Dongguan Prison in 2019. They described overcrowded living conditions and sweltering heat in the summertime. A German ex-prisoner said that the prisoners were forced to work nine-hour days, six or seven days a week, manufacturing model Porsche cars, Samsonite-branded luggage locks, and transformers. Several ex-inmates described torture and abuse of prisoners, including the strapping of prisoners to a torture chair for days or weeks, and electric shocks.

== Notable prisoners ==
- Danny Cancian – New Zealand businessman, detained from November 2008 to release in November 2012
- Jean Montret – French citizen, detained in September 2009 and transferred to France in December 2010
- 米高尔, Russian. The friend of Jean Montret. Vladimir Putin's Alumni.
- Robert Rother – German businessman, detained in May 2011 - released in December 2018
- Xu Zerong – (zh:徐泽荣) Hong Kong resident. detained in 2002 - released on June 23, 2011
- Matthew Ng – Australian businessman
- James Peng Jiandong – Australian businessman abducted in 1993 from Macau, then a Portuguese territory, by the Chinese government. Transferred to Qingpu Prison in 1997.
- Chen Meng – Cantonese musician, jailed for leaking a Chinese government blacklist of overseas dissidents
- Lau Chun-hin (劉駿軒) – Hong Kong Internet personality

== See also ==
- List of prisons in Guangdong
