= Pingshi, Guangdong =

Pingshi 坪石镇 Pingshek
- Town
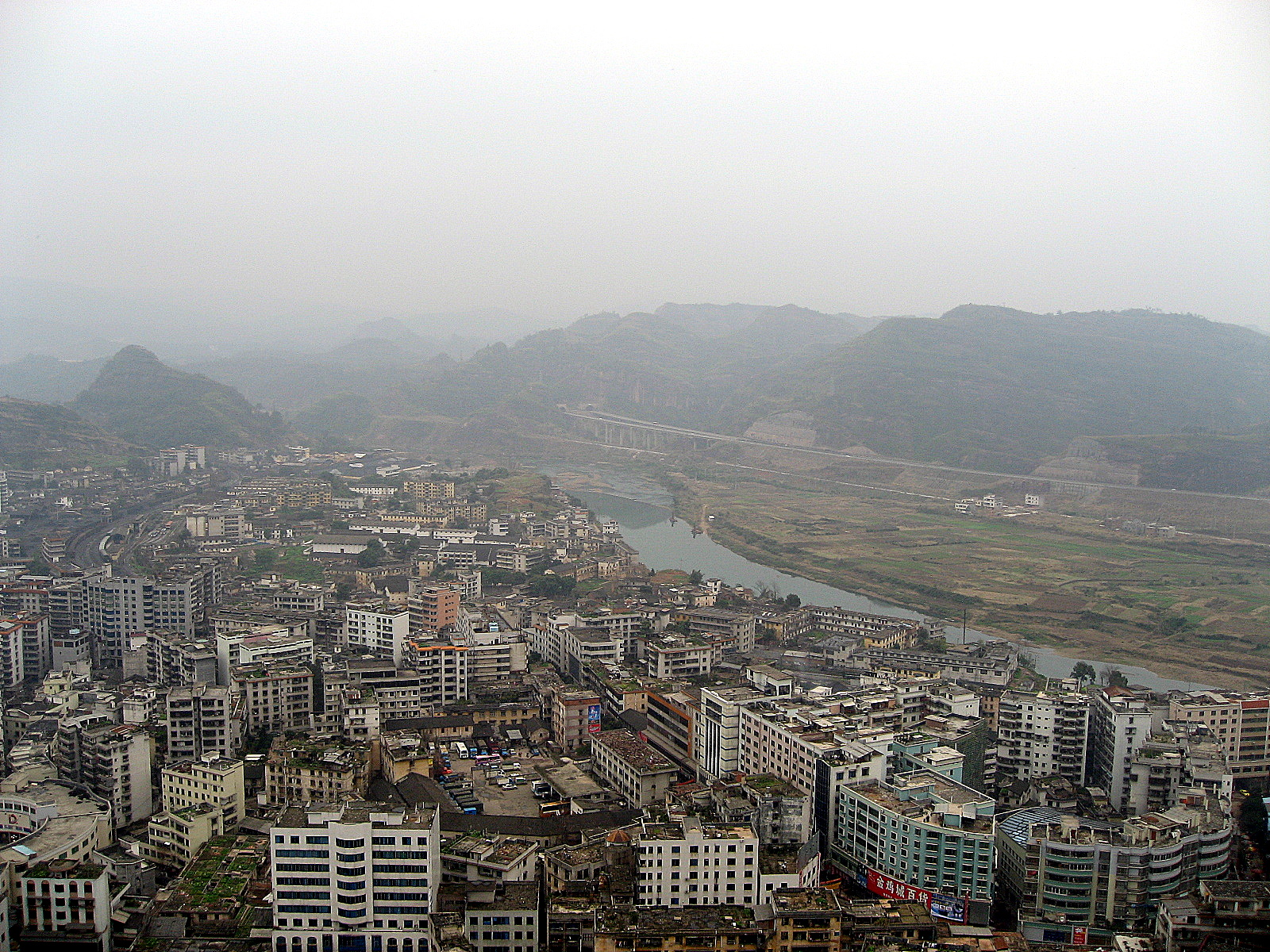
- Panoramic view of Pingshi Town.

- Location in Guangdong
- Coordinates: 25°17′00″N 113°03′27″E
- Country: People's Republic of China
- Province: Guangdong
- Prefecture-level city: Shaoguan
- County-level city: Lechang

Area
  - Total: 268 km^{2} (103 sq mi)
- Elevation: 185 m (607 ft)

Population (2006)
  - Total: 120,000
  - Density: 450/km^{2} (1,200/sq mi)
- Time zone: UTC+8 (China Standard)

Pingshi Town (simplified Chinese: 坪石镇; traditional Chinese: 坪石鎮; pinyin: Píngshí Zhèn) is a town of Lechang City, in the far north of Guangdong Province, China, near the border with Hunan. It is located along the Wu River (武江), a tributary of the Bei River. As of 2006 it had a population of 120,000 residing in an area of 268 km^{2} (103 sq mi).

Pingshi was called Pingshi County (平石县, literally "flat rock county") during the Southern and Northern Dynasties (420–589). The county district was 4 km (2.5 mi) from Sanxingping Village. Nowadays it is the "northern door of Guangdong" (广东北大门), serving as a prominent border trade and transit point for the provinces of Guangdong, Hunan and Jiangxi.

Pingshi lies at the intersection of the Beijing–Guangzhou Railway and the Wuhan–Guangzhou High-Speed Railway. Major roads passing through the town include the G4 Beijing–Hong Kong and Macau Expressway, China National Highway 107, and Guangdong Provincial Highways 248 and 249. City bridges include Pingshi Bridge, Futian Bridge, Pingmei Bridge, and Baisha Bridge.

Pingshi's GDP is 1.6 billion yuan. Pingshi B power plant powers the majority of northern Shaoguan. Major industries of Pingshi include Chinese medicine and zirconium products. There are over 2000 private and individual enterprises and a state-run prison.

The Pingshi region is rich in tourism resources. It is home to one of the eight wonders of Guangdong: "Jinji Ling" (金鸡岭, literally "Golden Chicken Mountain").
