= Foshan Shadi Airport =

Airport in Foshan, Guangdong, China

Foshan Shadi Airport 佛山沙堤机场
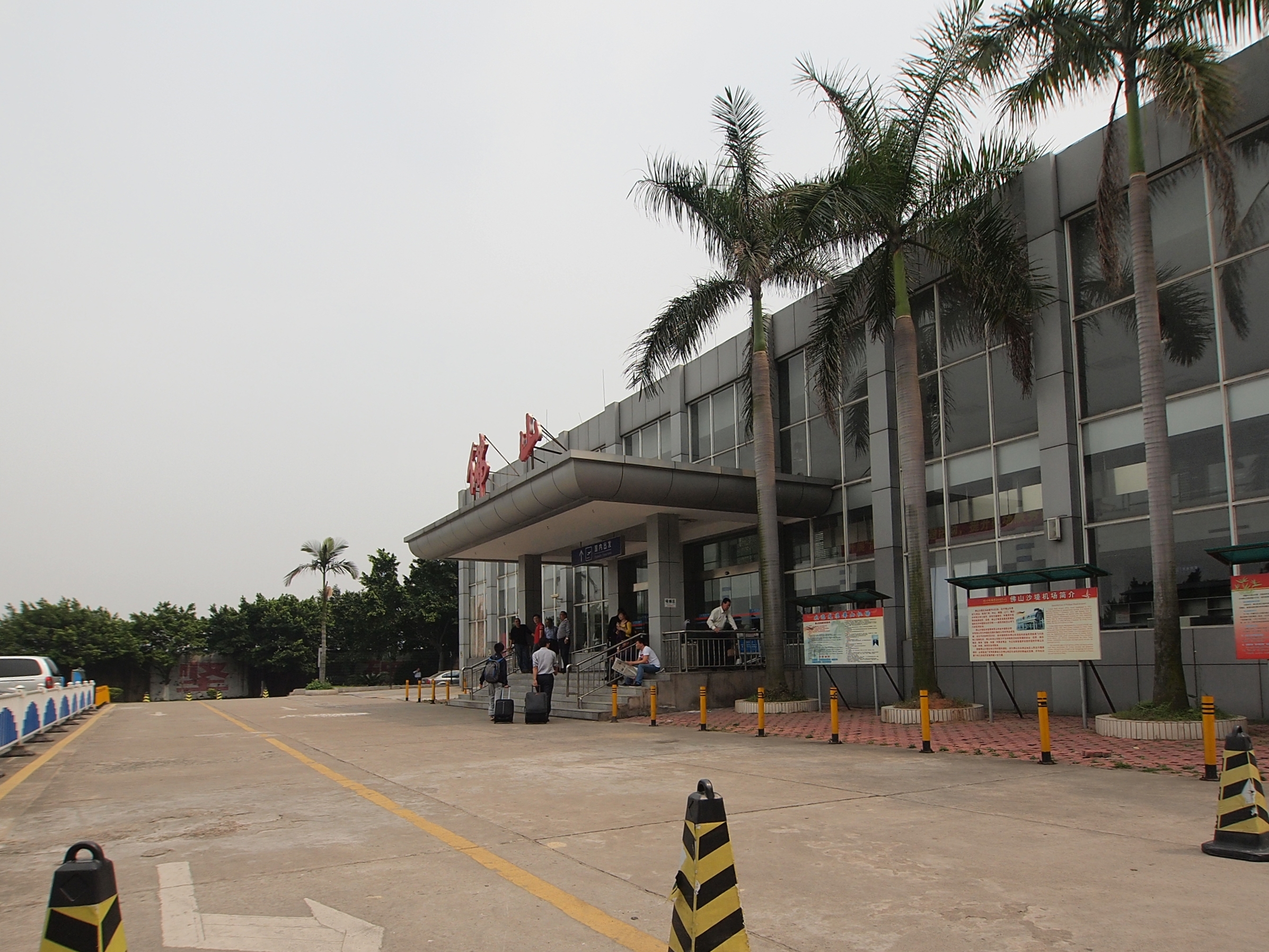
- IATA: FUO; ICAO: ZGFS

Summary
- Airport type: Public / military
- Owner: People's Liberation Army Air Force
- Serves: Pearl River Delta
- Location: Nanhai, Foshan, Guangdong, China
- Opened: Part 1: 1985; 41 years ago; Part 2: 18 November 2009; 17 years ago
- Passenger services ceased: Part 1: 31 October 2002
- Operating base for: China United Airlines
- Built: 1954; 72 years ago
- Coordinates: 23°04′57″N 113°04′15″E

Map
- Location of airport in Guangdong

Runways
Direction	Length		Surface
Direction	m	ft	Surface
01/19	2,800	9,186

Statistics (2025)
- Passengers: 1,460,420
- Aircraft movements: 9,554
- Cargo (metric tons): 0.0
- Source: CAAC Data 2023

Foshan Shadi Airport
- Simplified Chinese: 佛山沙堤机场
- Traditional Chinese: 佛山沙堤機場
Transcriptions
Standard Mandarin
- Hanyu Pinyin: Fóshān Shādī Jīchǎng
Yue: Cantonese
- Jyutping: fat^{6}saan^{1} saa^{1}tai^{4} gei^{1}coeng^{4}

Foshan Shadi Airport (IATA: FUO, ICAO: ZGFS), or Shadi Air Base, is a dual-use military and public airport serving the city of Foshan in South Central China's Guangdong province. FUO was re-opened to serve as a relief airport for the region. Along with two other major airports, Guangzhou Baiyun International Airport and Shenzhen Bao'an International Airport, it serves the catchment area of the Pearl River Delta Economic Zone.

== History ==
Foshan Shadi Airport was initially built in 1954. In 1963, the Civil Aviation Administration of China decided to expand Guangzhou Baiyun Airport to international airport standards. During the expansion of Baiyun Airport, all civil aviation passenger aircraft were transferred to the Foshan Shadi Air Force Airport for takeoff and landing.

Commercial flights started in 1985, but ceased in 2002 due to government policy. The airport was reopened to the public in 2009. Before the reopening, China United Airlines constructed a new terminal building with a total investment of approximately 100 million yuan, covering an area of 8,060 square meters and a total building area of 11,395 square meters. On November 18, 2009, Foshan Shadi Airport resumed civil aviation services. After renovation and refurbishment, the airport became a 4C-level domestic branch airport for both military and civilian use.

On October 19, 2017, Shadi Airport suspended civil aviation routes again and subsequently carried out a number of facility renovations; it reopened on October 12, 2018.

Due to the outbreak of the epidemic, the airport was closed from February 17 to March 3, 2020 and from June 12 to July 5, 2020.

In 2023, the airport exceeded 1 million annual passenger traffic for the first time.

On February 27, 2024, the new terminal project of Foshan Shadi Airport commenced. The project was funded by China United Airlines with a total investment of over 100 million yuan, covering an area of 8,060 square meters and a total building area of 11,395 square meters. It was expected to be completed and officially put into operation in the first half of 2024, and is designed to meet the passenger throughput of 2.6 million passengers by the target year of 2028.

At 11:30 on December 26, 2024, China United Airlines KN5867 flew from Beijing Daxing to Foshan, landed smoothly. The new terminal of Foshan Airport welcomed its first batch of arriving passengers, marking the official opening of the new terminal of China United Airlines at Foshan Airport.

On the morning of March 25, 2026, construction officially began on the Pearl River Delta Hub (Guangzhou New) Airport, located in Genghe Town, Gaoming District, Foshan. The new airport will directly serve more than 20 million people across Foshan, Zhaoqing, Jiangmen, Yunfu, and surrounding regions. It is intended to complement Guangzhou Baiyun International Airport and eventually replace the smaller Foshan Shadi Airport as the primary aviation facility for the area. The first phase of the project involves a total investment of 41.81 billion yuan and covers approximately 1,213 hectares. Current plans include two widely spaced parallel runways, a 260,000‑square‑meter terminal, and 94 aircraft stands. The airport is built to the 4E flight zone standard and is designed for an annual passenger throughput of 30 million, cargo and mail throughput of 500,000 tonnes, and 260,000 aircraft movements.

== Airlines and destinations ==
Airlines	Destinations
China United Airlines	Beijing–Daxing, Chengdu–Tianfu, Fuyang, Fuzhou, Hangzhou, Qingdao, Shanghai–Hongqiao, Shanghai–Pudong, Shijiazhuang, Taizhou, Wenzhou, Wuhu, Zhoushan

== See also ==
- Foshan Gaoming International Airport, a planned airport in Genghe town, Gaoming District, Foshan
- List of airports in China
- List of the busiest airports in China
- List of People's Liberation Army Air Force airbases
