= Jieyang Prison =

Prison in Guangdong, China

- Simplified Chinese: 揭阳监狱
- Traditional Chinese: 揭陽監獄
Transcriptions
Standard Mandarin
- Hanyu Pinyin: Jiēyáng Jiānyù
Yue: Cantonese
- Jyutping: kit3 joeng4 gaam1 juk6

Jieyang Prison (Chinese: 揭阳监狱; pinyin: Jiēyáng jiānyù) is a prison in Guangdong province, China. It was formerly named Dongjing Labor Reform Detachment. The prison is governed by the Guangdong Prison Administrative Bureau. In 1982 the prison housed around 700 inmates, and in late 1995 the number of inmates was approximately 3,900.

== Website ==
Jieyang Prison has a unique website that was the "first of its kind" in China, which provides information for the public, inmates and the families of inmates. In October 2014, the website received over 30,000 requests for inmate information and 270,000 page views. Family members of inmates can access the site using a username and password, and can obtain information about inmate health, prison terms, paroling, sentence reductions and how personal funds are spent in the prison. Reservations for visiting inmates can also be placed using the website.

In April 2014, the prison implemented a video conferencing meeting system that is used for inmates to communicate with relatives who live far from the area or who are too ill to visit in person. The meeting system is coordinated through the prisons website. It is the first such system in China, and was initiated at Jieyang Prison as a pilot program. The meeting system was implemented in part to increase transparency and openness using such technology.

== Labor ==
In 1996, it was reported in the publication "Prison Work Newsletter" published by the Chinese government that garments had been produced at Jieyang Prison for the prior 12 years. The work performed has been described as forced labor, because the inmates are required to do it. The garments are sold on the international market. Additional products produced at the prison include watchbands, artificial Christmas trees, mineral water, rosary beads and chinaware. Labor has been subcontracted at the prison from the Jixiang Knitting Garment Factory. It was reported in 1997 that approximately 80% of prison inmates perform the labor.

== See also ==
- List of prisons
- Penal system in China
