= Shilong, Guangdong =

Town in China

Shilong 石龙镇 Sheklung; Shihlung
- Town
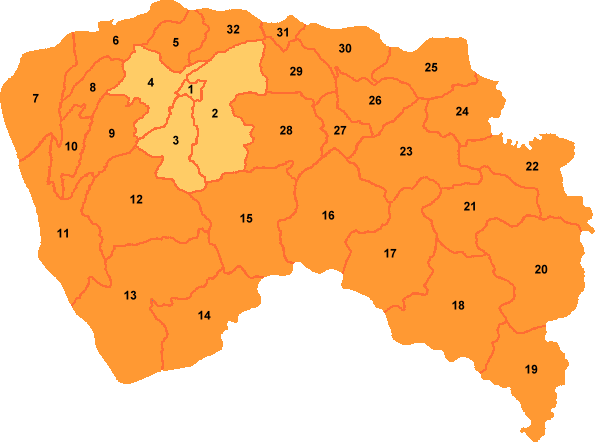
- Shilong is labelled '31' on this map of Dongguan

- Location in Guangdong
- Coordinates: 23°06′21″N 113°52′28″E
- Country: People's Republic of China
- Province: Guangdong
- Prefecture-level city: Dongguan
- Time zone: UTC+8 (China Standard)

Shilong (simplified Chinese: 石龙镇; traditional Chinese: 石龍鎮; pinyin: Shílóng zhèn) is an industrial town under the direct administration of the prefecture-level city of Dongguan, Guangdong province, People's Republic of China.

Shilong Town is located at the lower reaches of the Dong River at the convergence of the northern stem and southern branch of the Dongjiang River forming one river with three wharfs. The town covers a total land area of 13.83 km^{2} (5.34 sq mi), with the registered permanent residents of up to 67,900, and the migrant population totaling 77,500.

== History ==
During the Song dynasty (800 years ago), the first inhabitants settled down in Shilong town. Due to the waterway of Dongjian river, Shilong become a major hub for food supply and wood in southern China since the late Ming dynasty to the early Qing dynasty.

After the opening of the Kowloon-Canton railway (KCR) at 1910, which passed through Shilong, its status as a traffic and commercial center was strengthened and its economy grew. Shilong became one of the 'Four Big Town in Guangdong'.

Its famous weightlifting world record breaker - Chen Jin-Kai (陈镜开) has also won Shilong's reputation as the 'Home Town of Weight Lifting' ((in Chinese)).

== Location ==
Shilong town is located within the north part of Dongguan prefecture-level city. It is situated at the central point of the Pearl River Delta, in conjunction with Zengcheng District and Boluo County, 69 km to Guangzhou city and 78 km to Shenzhen city. The town lies on the shore of the Dongjiang River and the Guangshen Railway passes by.

== Transport ==
Shilong serves as a regional industrial and commercial hub due to its advantageous railway and water transportation connectivity. The town's transportation infrastructure is well-developed, with a high level of accessibility. With 20 buses available for every 10 thousand residents and 27 bus lines connecting to surrounding cities, transportation within and beyond the town is efficient. Additionally, there are 83 pairs of electrified express intercity passenger buses running between Guangzhou and Shenzhen daily, facilitating easy movement between these major cities.

There is a bus service from Shilong to Shenzhen Bao'an International Airport in Shenzhen.

== Economy ==
In 2004, Shilong's GDP amounted to 3.66 billion RMB and export income grew to $1.14 billion. Shilong is very strong in the IT industry. 2.4 million cameras, 3 million computers, 750 thousand photocopiers and 1.8 million digital laser printers were manufactured in Shilong in 2004, most of which were exported.

Dongguan Prison is located in Shilong.

== Ecology ==
In 2008, Shilong was designated by the State as a "renowned historical and cultural town in China." The town is home to 27 ancient trees, with one tree exceeding 300 years in age and 16 trees surpassing 100 years. To preserve these ancient trees systematically, the Town Government has created electronic archives and name cards for each tree, enabling scientific and efficient management. Shilong also boasts 28 sites of historical and cultural significance, with five designated as key cultural relic protection units at the municipal level.

== Culture ==
In order to protect intangible cultural heritage, the Government set up a development fund for Cantonese Opera. Presently, five folk ballad singers' associations take turns hosting free performances every Saturday evening in Yat-sen Park. Various museums and exhibition centers have also been established as cultural and educational hubs in the area.

In 2005, Shilong was listed as the Dragon Boat Champion Center in China by the National General Administration of Sports. Each year, there are more than 90 cultural and artistic evening parties of all kinds and more than 30 art shows.

== See also ==
- Shilong railway station
