= Pingshi (text) =

Treatise on flower arrangement

Pingshi (Chinese: 瓶史), translated into English as History of the Art of Floral Composition, History of Flower Arranging, or History of the Vase, is a treatise by Ming dynasty scholar Yuan Hongdao on flower arrangement.

== Contents ==
In Pingshi, he writes positively about the obsessive pursuit of flower arrangement, referred to in Chinese as huapi (花癖) and huachi (花痴). (Note: Both terms are translated into English as "flower worship".) By the Ming dynasty, obsession had become popularly accepted as a "means of self-expression" or, as Yuan writes, "self loving the self". Although he identifies as someone who practises flower arrangement, Yuan is quick to disassociate himself from the "truly obsessed". The text also offers practical advice on flower arrangement and discusses tangential topics like the value of antique porcelain vases. In total, Pingshi contains thirteen sections.

== Background ==
According to Duncan Campbell, Pingshi "is an important early example of the burgeoning late Ming literature of connoisseurship" and it "was to prove influential in the development of the Japanese art of flower arrangement".

Described by Yuan Hongdao as "a record of flower nomenclature and the traditions associated with various flowers", Pingshi was written while he was in Beijing. According to a letter that Yuan wrote to his friend Tao Wangling, the work was completed in the spring of the 27th year of the Wanli Emperor's reign (1599). In an earlier letter to his brother-in-law Li Xueyuan (李學元), Yuan compared Pingshi to The Classic of Tea by Lu Yu.

Pingshi was collected in Yuan's Pinghuazhai ji (瓶花齋集), or Vase Studio Collection, whose earliest surviving edition dates to 1606. A partial English translation by Lin Yutang, titled Vase Flowers, was published in 1938, whereas a French translation titled L’arrangement de fleurs en Chine was published in 1964. A full English translation by Duncan Campbell was published in 2003.
