= Gaoming, Foshan =

Gaoming 高明区
- District
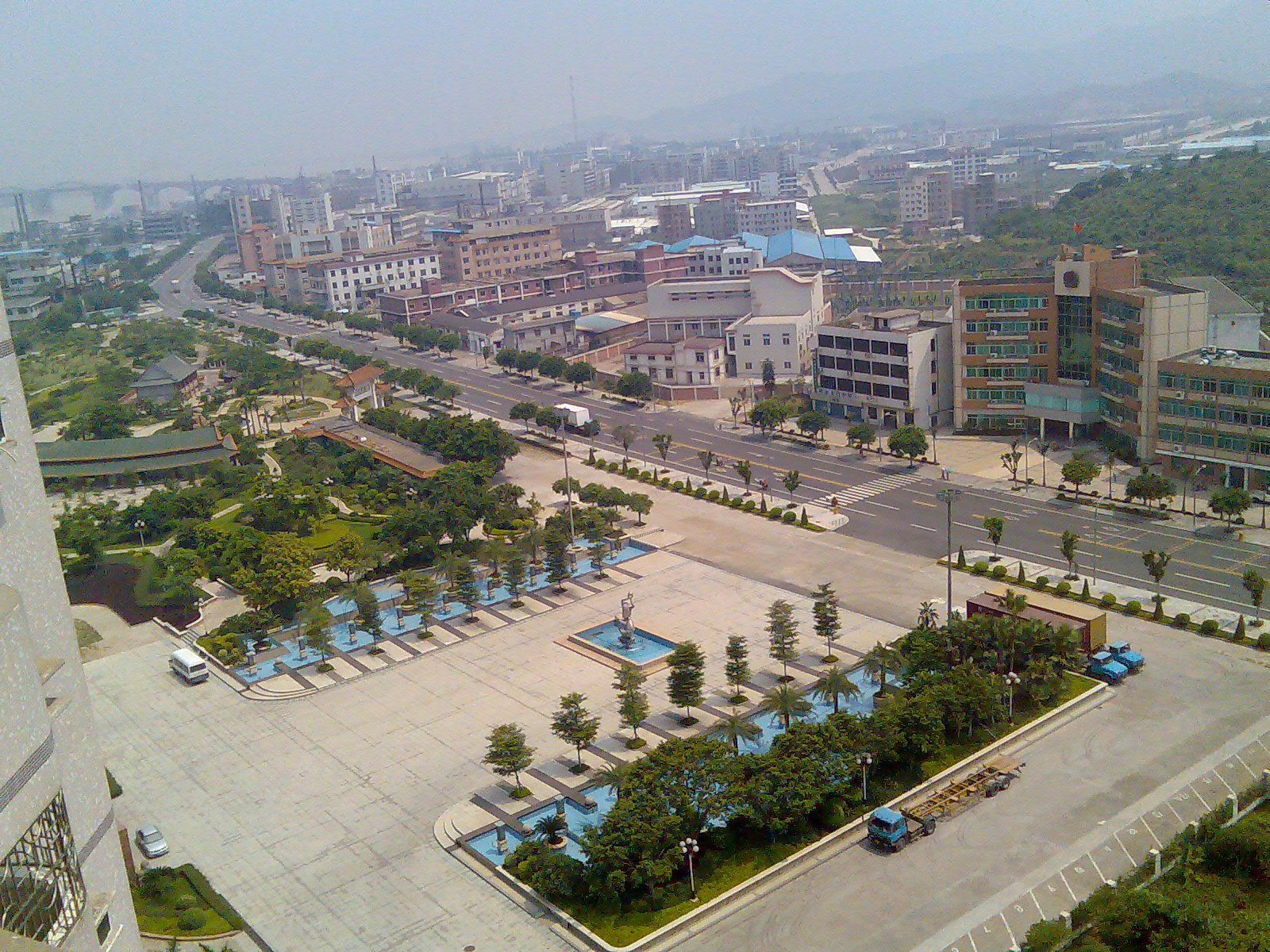
- Gaoming District, seen from a high rise apartment

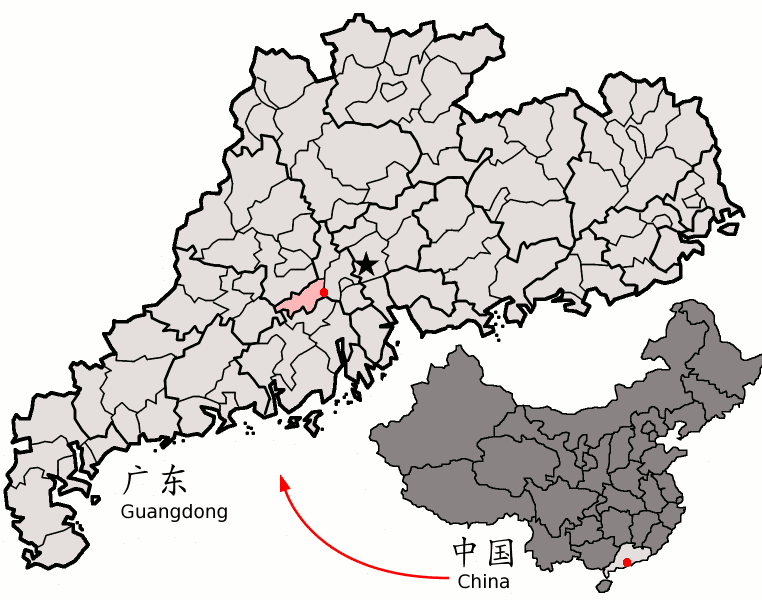
- Location of Gaoming District in Foshan and Guangdong
- Interactive map of Gaoming
- Country: People's Republic of China
- Province: Guangdong
- Prefecture-level city: Foshan

Area
  - Total: 967.4 km^{2} (373.5 sq mi)

Population (2020 Census)
  - Total: 469,038
  - Density: 484.8/km^{2} (1,256/sq mi)
- Time zone: UTC+8 (China Standard)
- Postal code: 528500
- Website: www.gaoming.gov.cn

Gaoming
- Chinese: 高明
- Jyutping: Gou1-ming4
- Cantonese Yale: Gōumìhng
- Hanyu Pinyin: Gāomíng
- Postal: Koming
- Literal meaning: High-&-Bright; Brilliant; Glorious
Transcriptions
Standard Mandarin
- Hanyu Pinyin: Gāomíng
Yue: Cantonese
- Yale Romanization: Gōumìhng
- Jyutping: Gou1-ming4

Gaoming, (Note: Gaoming has also been romanized as Kaou Ming.) formerly officially romanized as Koming from Cantonese, is an urban district of Foshan, Guangdong, China. Gaoming is located west of downtown Foshan and had a population of 469,038 during the 2020 census. It covers an area of 967.4 km^{2} (373.5 sq mi).

== History ==
There were inhabitants settled in the region around four thousand years. Under the Qing, Gaoming County was administered as part of the commandery of Zhaoqing.

== Administration divisions ==
Gaoming District is located within Foshan of Pearl River Delta region. Neighboring county-level cities, districts, and counties are Gaoyao to the North, Xinxing County to the West, Heshan to the South, Nanhai District and Sanshui District to the East, respectively. The district is divided into one subdistrict and three towns.

Name	Chinese (S)	Hanyu Pinyin	Population (2020)	Area (km^{2})
Hecheng Subdistrict	荷城街道	Héchéng Jiēdào	319,388	178.58
Yanghe town	杨和镇	Yánghé Zhèn	54,772	246.27
Genghe town	更合镇	Gènghé Zhèn	50,516	365.00
Mingcheng town	明城镇	Míngchéng Zhèn	44,362	186.50

== Economy ==
Gaoming has resources of gold, copper, tungsten and other minerals. Gaoming county is an important producer of foodstuffs within Guangdong, as well as food and textiles.

McDonald's and KFC both feature along Wenchang Rd. alongside other Western clothes retail outlets and Watson's pharmacy stores. Otherwise, Western shops are rare. Nonetheless, shopping facilities cater well for day-to-day needs. The primary shopping streets are Canjiang Lu, Wenchang Lu and Wenhau Lu. Markets are also numerous and can be found simply by turning off the primary streets into nearby side-roads.

This CRRC facility in Gaoming Industrial Park manufactures metro trains and light rail vehicles with an annual capacity of 300 vehicles. Using automated production and smart systems, it supplies vehicles for Foshan Metro Line 2 and other Greater Bay Area transit projects.

== Transport ==
Gaoming is not particularly well integrated into transport systems. The railway from Guangzhou to Maoming as well as the Guangzhou-Foshan-Kaiping highway do not reach this area of the District. Gaoming has a river port on the Xi River.

Gaoming has a sizeable long-distance bus station located on Hexiang Lu. It provides transport to a number of locations including Guangzhou, Foshan, Kaiping and Zhuhai in mainland China, and Hong Kong. Buses to Guangzhou terminate at Fangcun Bus Station (adjoined to Ximenkou Metro) and the Central Bus Station (adjoined to Guangzhou Train Station). Both buses take just over an hour and cost around Y33.

Buses to Chancheng cost either 8 or 10 yuan, depending on whether you take the slower or faster bus.

The future Foshan Gaoming International Airport is currently being built in Genghe town, which will replace the Foshan Shadi Airport in Nanhai District.

The 23.5 km extension of Foshan Metro Line 2 connects Nanzhuang station to Gaoming Station with 10 stations. Key points include Gaoming Hub Station (future intercity rail connection) and Xijiang New City Station. Construction began in 2023, with completion expected in 2028. This project will provide Gaoming District with its first metro access.

== Activities ==
Gaoming is famous for its Lai Fen, a type of rice noodles, a local food only found here.

Gaoming has plenty of entertainment for its size. There are two cinemas, an old one on Canjiang Lu and another one within the newly opened Walmart. There are also several places where you can play pool or snooker, gyms, and some bars. One of the most popular places to go in Gaoming is the Century Square, a large flat open space by the river. Many people gather here in the evening to go dancing (many different styles), go rollerskating, play with kites, or simply to have a walk.
