= China United Airlines =

Low-cost airline of China

China United Airlines 中国联合航空

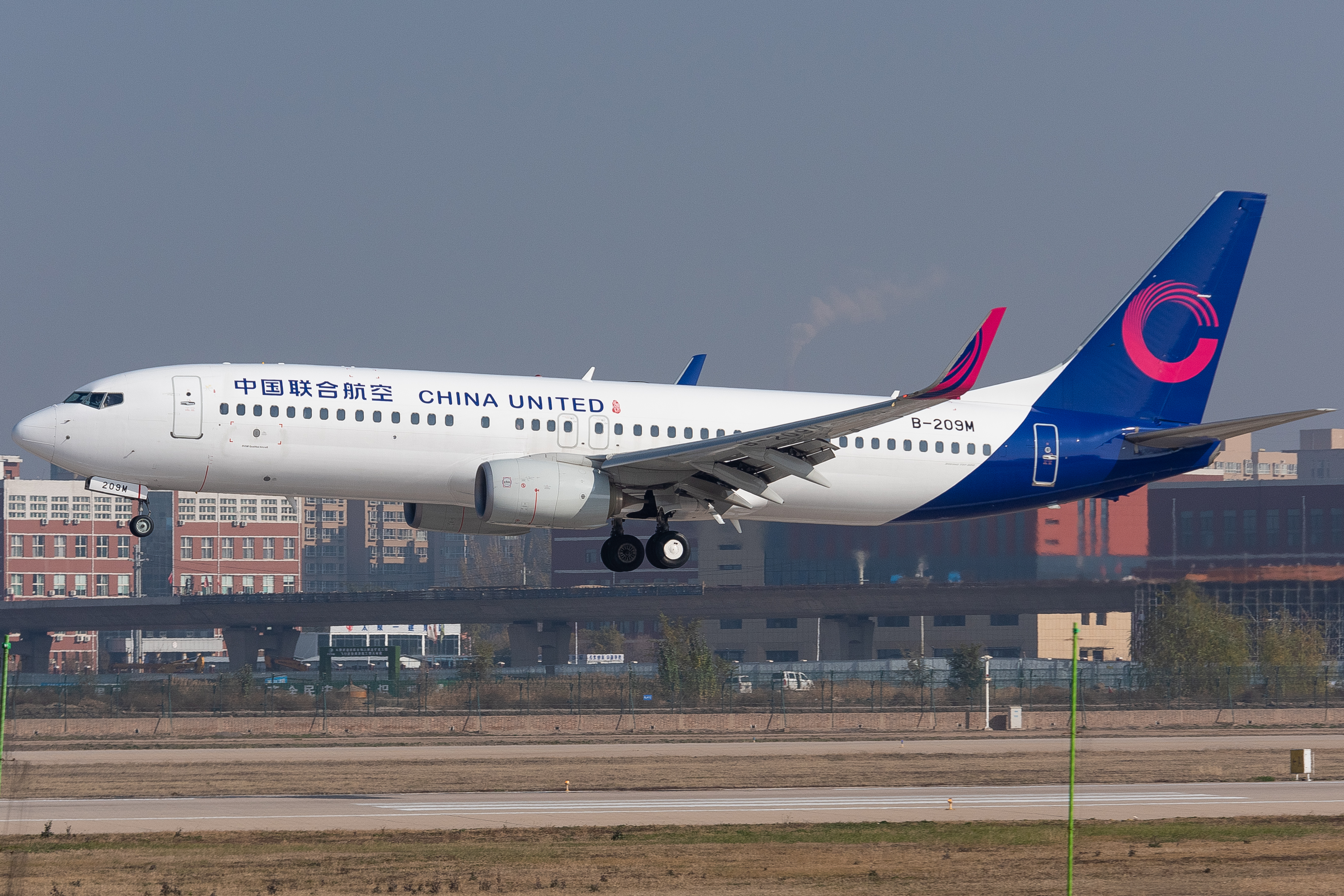
| IATA | ICAO | Call sign |
|---|---|---|
| KN | CUA | LIANHANG |
- Founded: 25 December 1986; 39 years ago
- Operating bases: Beijing–Daxing; Chengdu–Tianfu; Foshan; Shijiazhuang; Wenzhou
- Fleet size: 56
- Destinations: 87
- Parent company: China Eastern Airlines
- Headquarters: Beijing Daxing International Airport, Daxing, Beijing
- Website: www.flycua.com

China United Airlines
- Simplified Chinese: 中国联合航空
- Traditional Chinese: 中國聯合航空
Transcriptions
Standard Mandarin
- Hanyu Pinyin: Zhōngguó liánhé hángkōng
Yue: Cantonese
- Jyutping: zung^{1}gwok^{3} lyun^{4}hap^{6} hong^{4}hung^{1}

China United Airlines (Note: simplified Chinese: 中国联合航空; traditional Chinese: 中國聯合航空; pinyin: Zhōngguó liánhé hángkōng) is a low-cost airline headquartered at Beijing Daxing International Airport. It is a subsidiary of China Eastern Airlines.

== History ==
China United Airlines was established in 1986 as an arm of the civil transport division of the People's Liberation Army Air Force. In 2000, China United Airlines spent US$120 million to buy a Boeing 767-300ER, which was previously ordered by Delta Air Lines, as Jiang Zemin's private jet. Several days before its first flight, covert listening devices were found installed in the toilet, corridor, and even in Jiang's headboard. The devices were believed to be controlled and monitored by satellite. The Central Intelligence Agency, the United States Embassy in China, and China United Airlines refused to comment on this incident. The specific aircraft was sold to Air China and then Sunday Airlines of Kazakhstan in 2014 after its retirement.

In November 2002, all scheduled services were ceased, followed by a full suspension of flight operations in 2003 due to a Chinese governmental regulation prohibiting the Army from being directly involved in commercial activities. On 4 June 2005, the Civil Aviation Administration of China approved the relaunch of the airline, with Shanghai Airlines holding 80 percent of the stake, as well as China Aviation Supplies Holding Company as a secondary shareholder. Even though China United Airlines has since then lost its military status, it is uniquely still permitted to use military air bases as destinations, in contrast to other Chinese airlines and other airlines in general.

China United Airlines was acquired by China Eastern Airlines in 2010 as the result of China Eastern's merger with its parent company, Shanghai Airlines. While Shanghai Airlines website has been integrated into the China Eastern website, China United Airlines continues to have its own website though it only use Chinese language.

With the opening of Beijing Daxing International Airport on 26 September 2019, China United Airlines began service from the new airport as its main hub and ceased service from Beijing Nanyuan Airport, which was its main operating base since its foundation.

== Corporate ==
The headquarters is on the grounds of Beijing Daxing International Airport in Daxing, Beijing. Previously, the headquarters were in Fengtai. The customer service center is in Xinhua, Shijiazhuang, Hebei.

== Destinations ==
As of April 2026, the airline flies to 87 destinations in China, Russia and Laos.

== Fleet ==
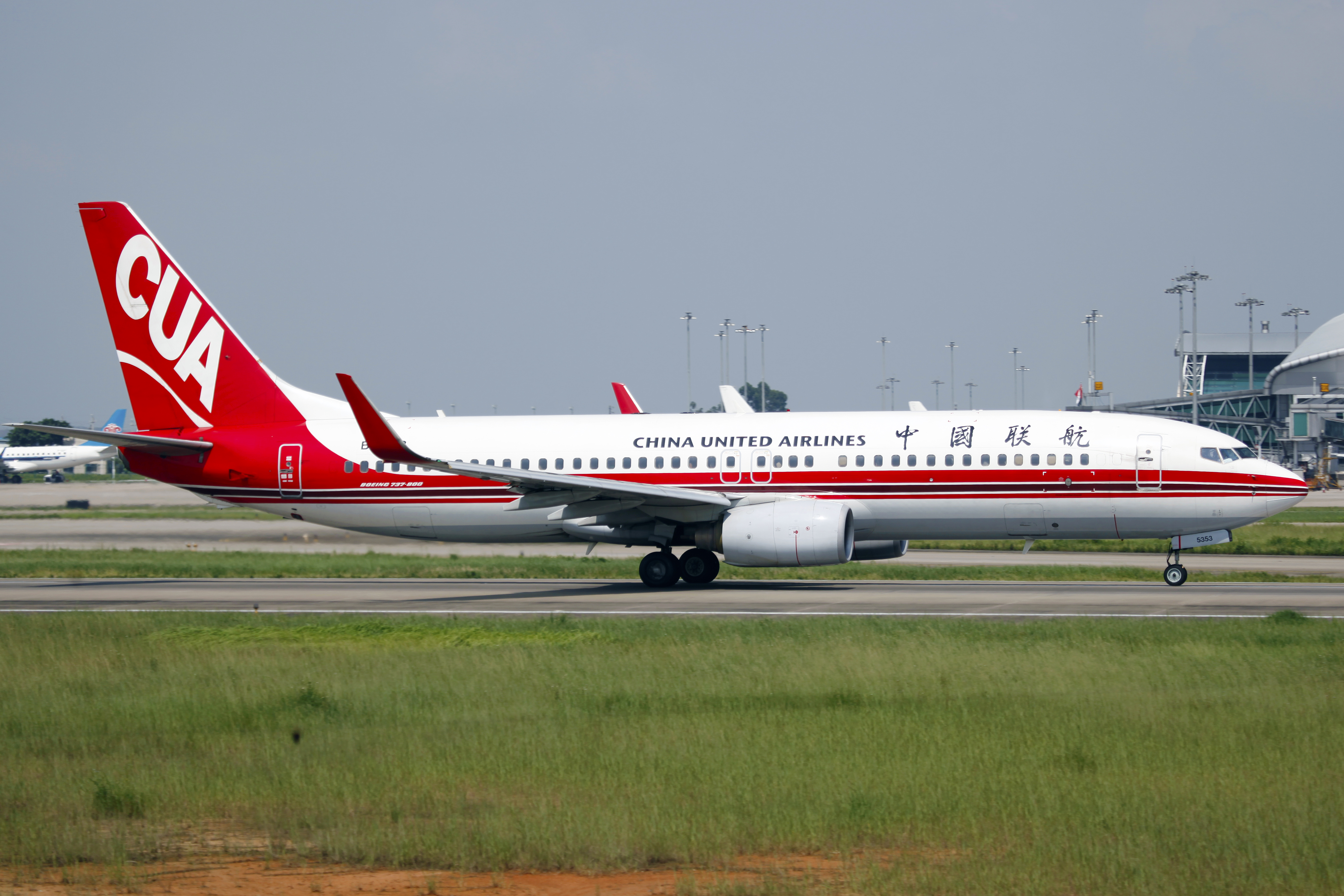
China United Airlines Boeing 737-800 at Guangzhou Baiyun International Airport

As of August 2025, China United Airlines operates the following aircraft:

China United Airlines fleet
| Aircraft | In service | Orders | Passengers | Notes |
|---|---|---|---|---|
| Boeing 737-700 | 5 | — | 144 | |
| Boeing 737-800 | 55 | — | 186 | 2 aircraft transferred from China Eastern 737-800s replaced 2 others that were retired in December 2025. |
| Total | 60 | — | | |

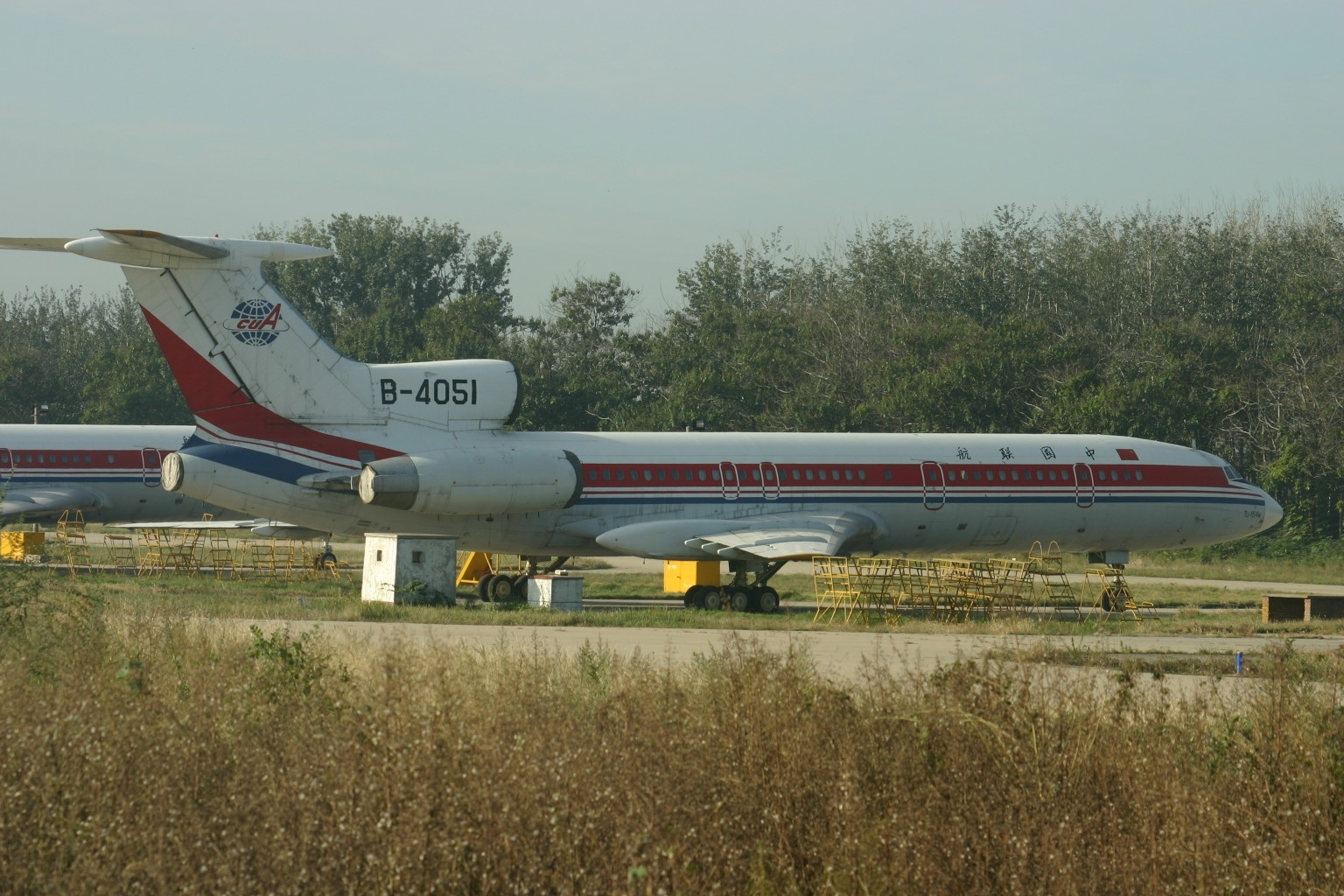
China United Airlines Tupolev Tu-154M

== Special liveries ==
China United Airlines has a total of 7 special livery aircraft in service, all of which are named after cities in China:

- B-5448 (Boeing 737-800) – named and decorated after Huangguoshu Waterfall, Anshun, Guizhou
- B-5665 (Boeing 737-800) – named and decorated after Baotou, Inner Mongolia
- B-5470 (Boeing 737-800) – named and decorated after Rizhao, Shandong
- B-7561 (Boeing 737-800) – named and decorated after Xingyi, Guizhou
- B-5471 (Boeing 737-800) – named and decorated after Qingyang, Gansu
- B-1750 (Boeing 737-800) – named and decorated after Lianyungang, Jiangsu
- B-7371 (Boeing 737-800) – named and decorated after Wuhu, Anhui
China United Airlines Special Liveries

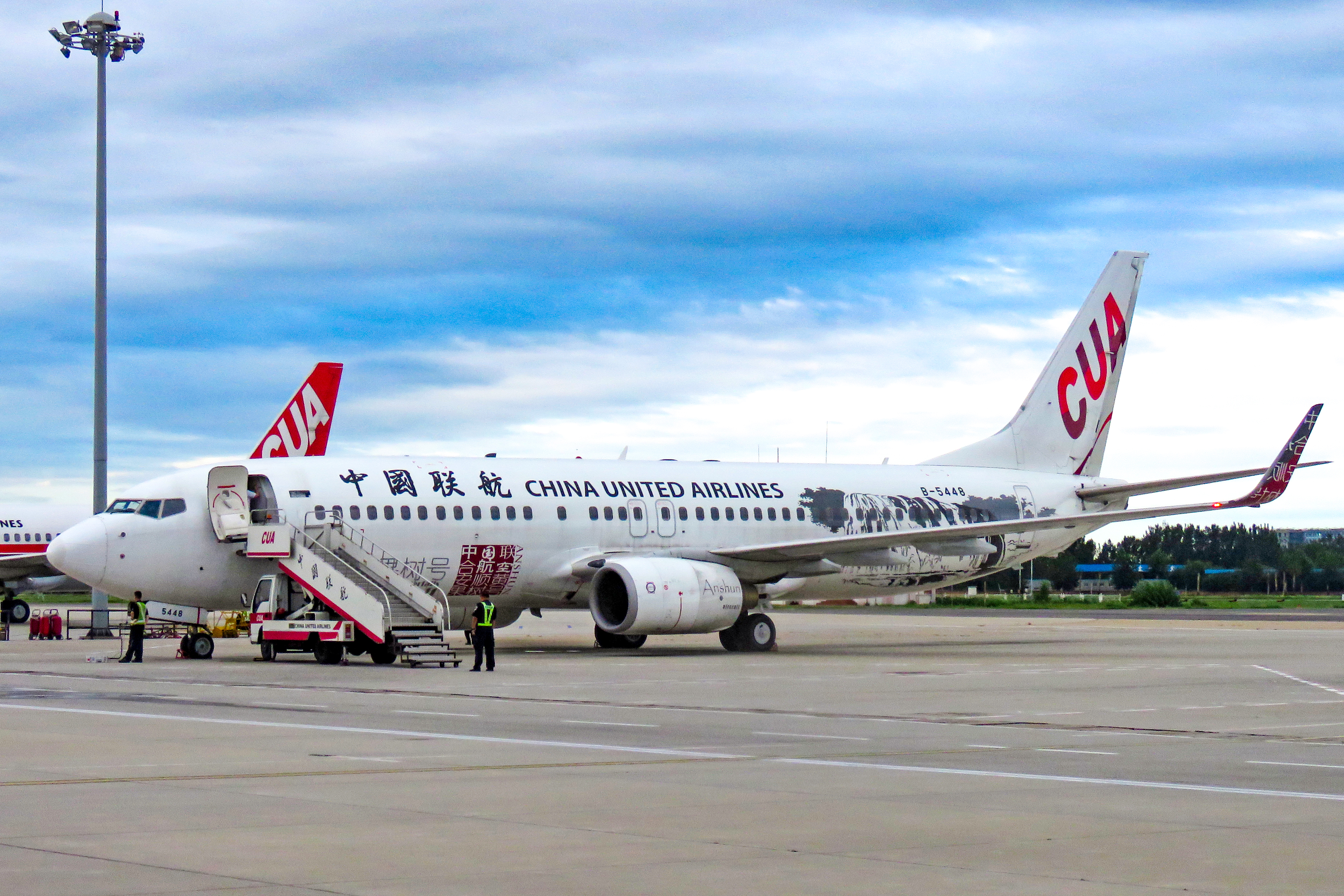
A Boeing 737-800 (B-5448) in Anshun Huangguoshu Waterfalls livery.

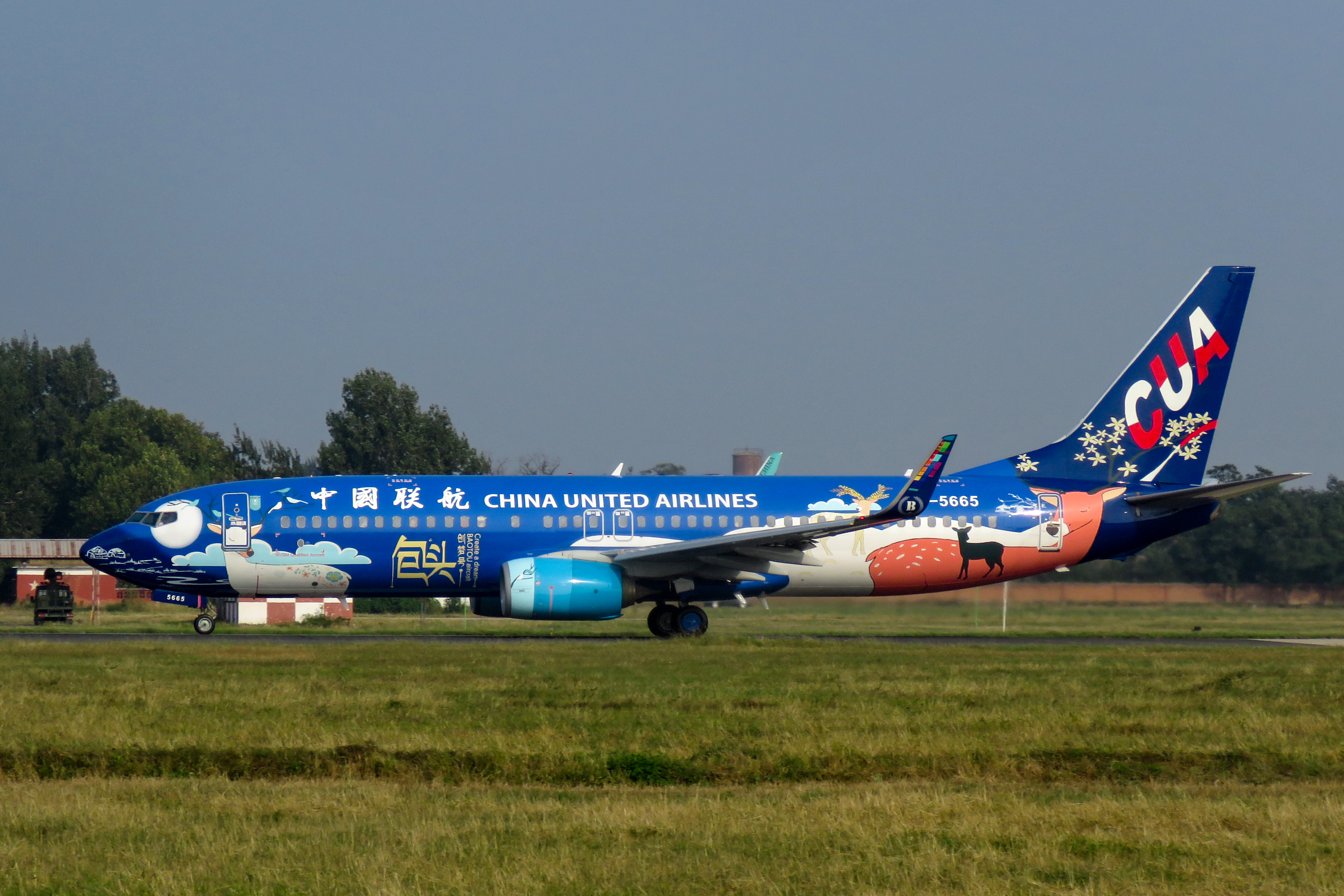
A Boeing 737-800 (B-5665) in Create a Dream - Baotou livery.

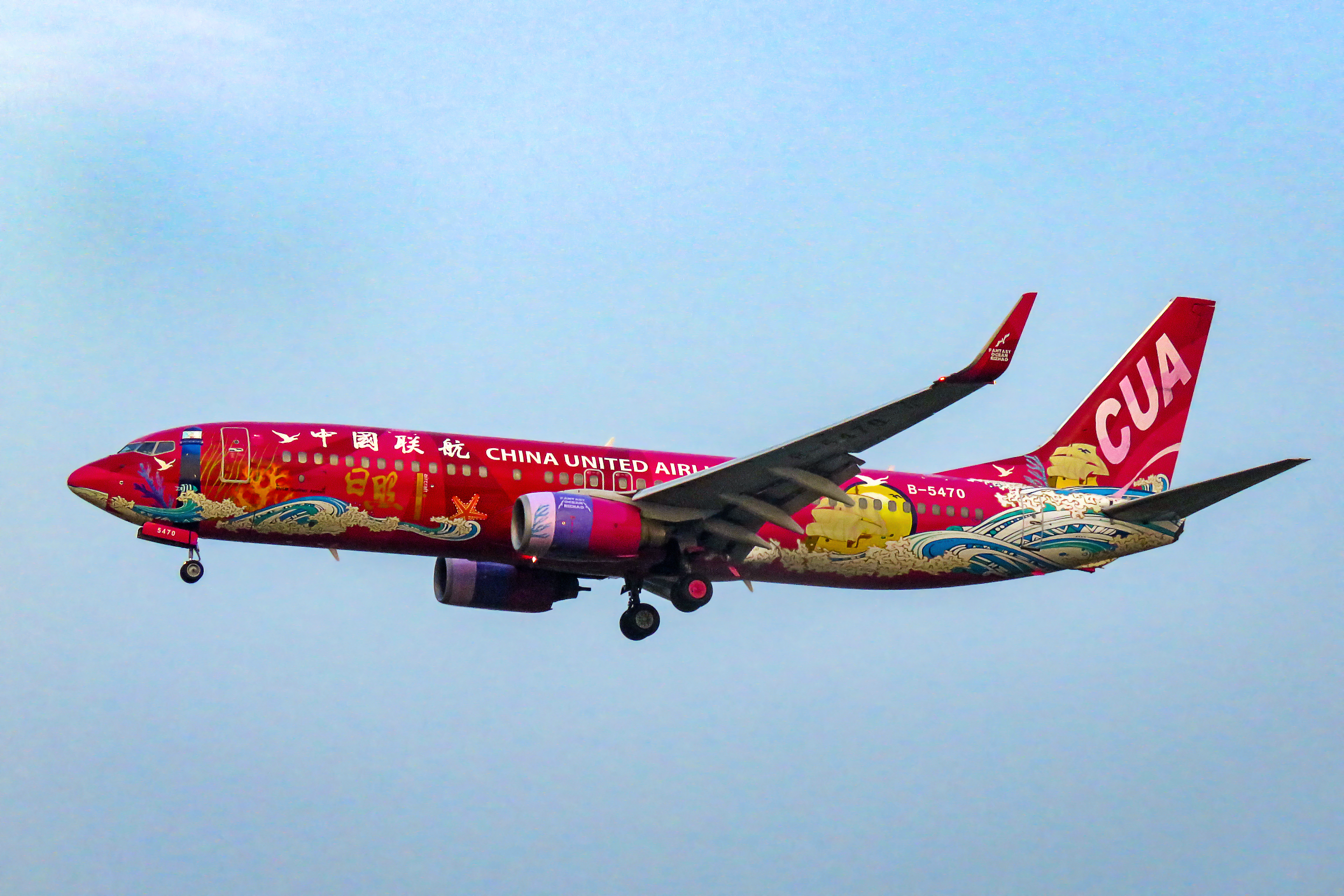
A Boeing 737-800 (B-5470) in Fantasy Ocean Rizhao livery.

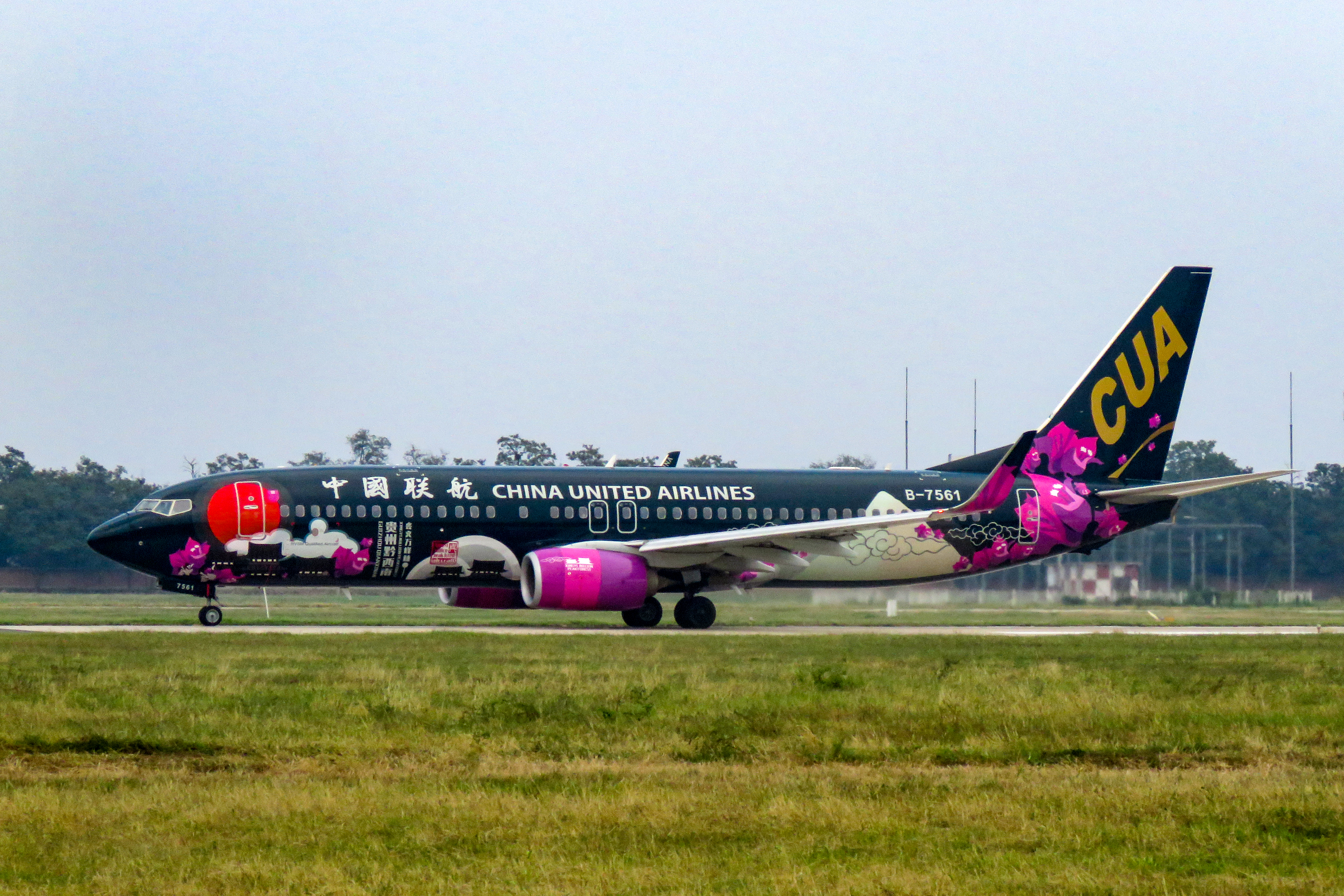
A Boeing 737-800 (B-7561) in Xingyi Million Peak Forest livery.

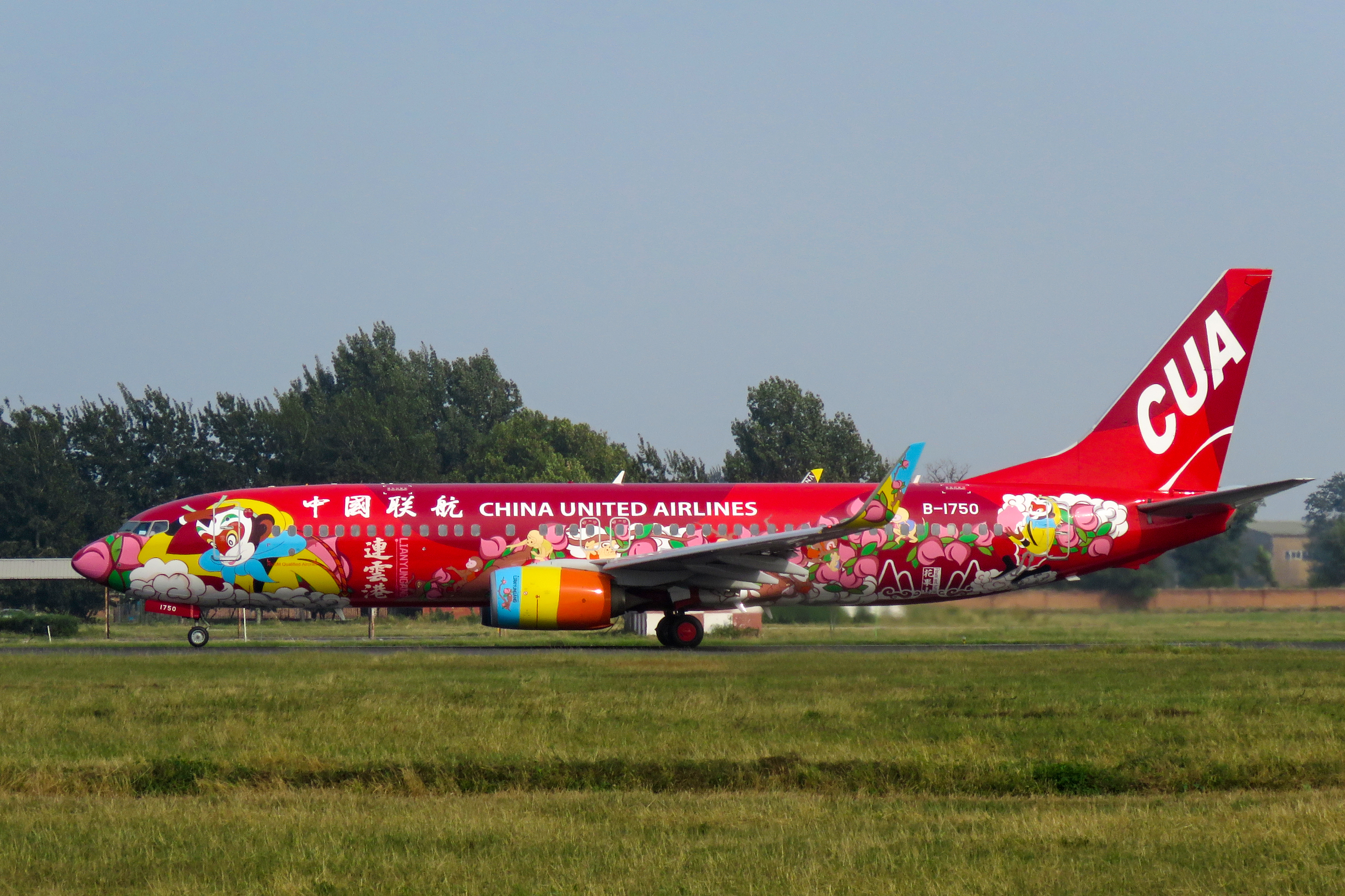
A Boeing 737-800 (B-1750) in Lianyungang - Flower and Fruit Hill livery.

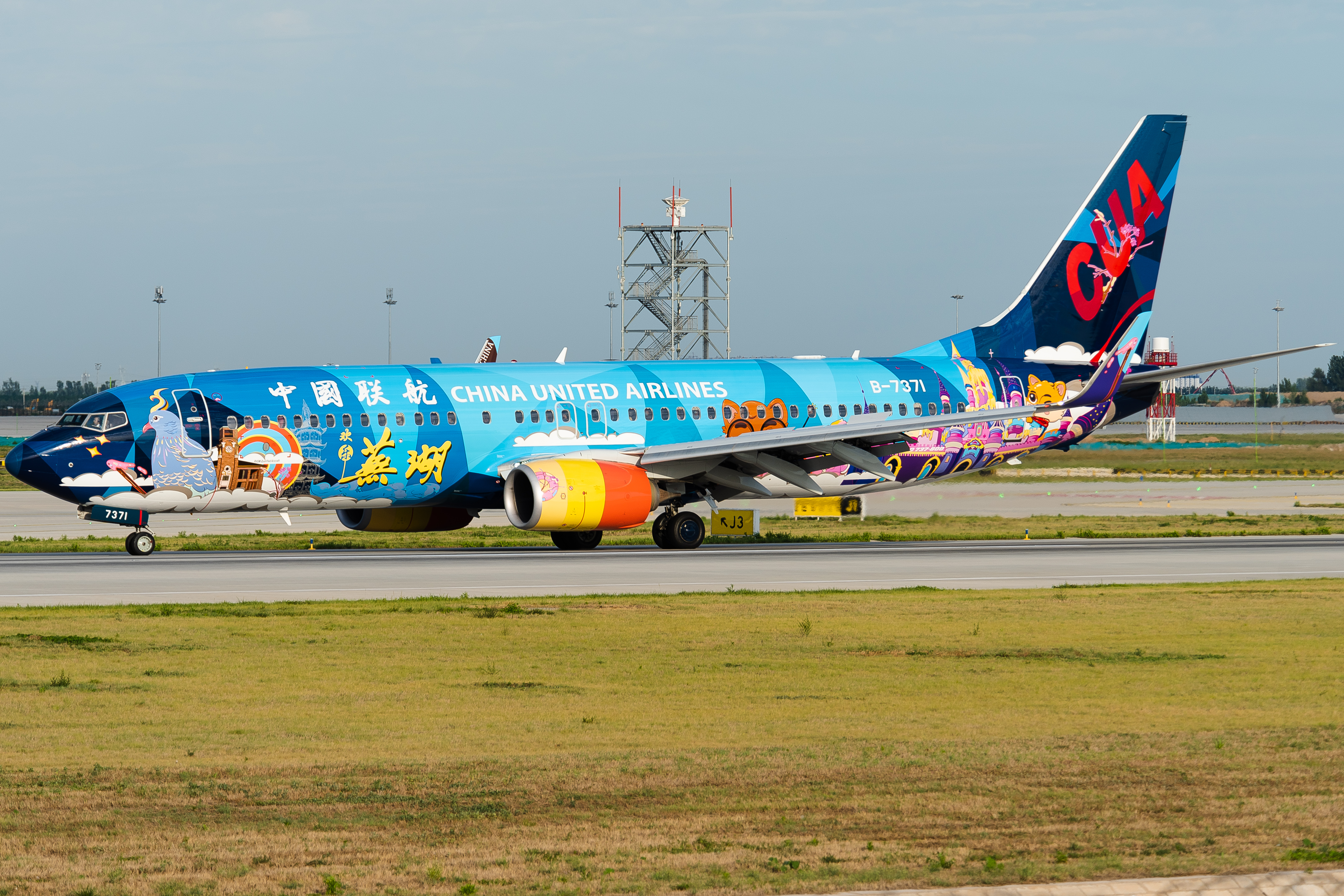
A Boeing 737-800 (B-7371) in Happy Wuhu livery.
