= Lechang =

Lechang 乐昌市 Lokchong
- County-level city
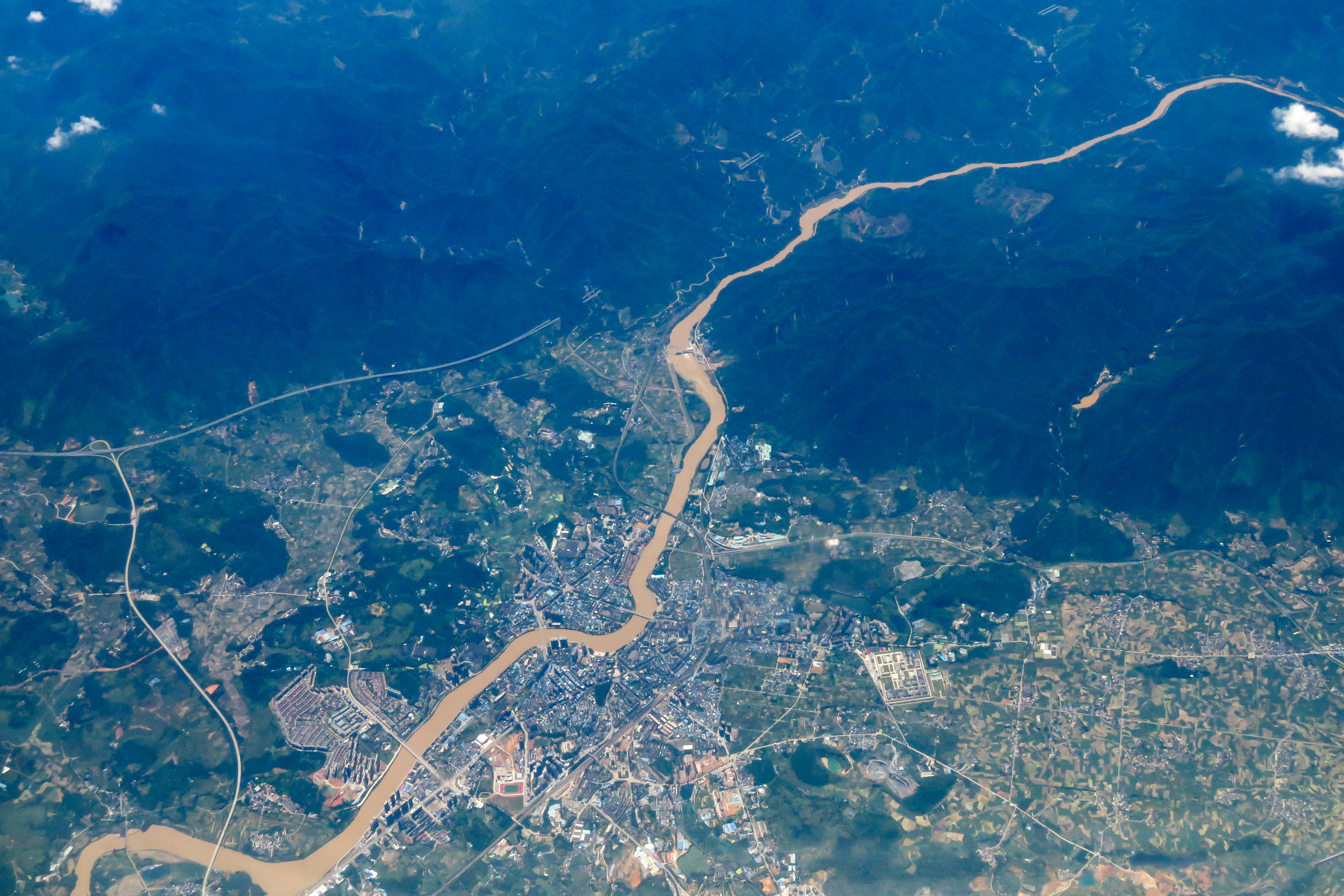

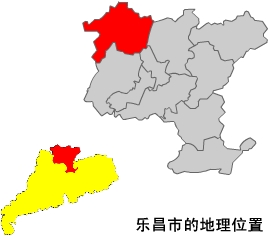
- Lechang within Shaoguan City

- Location in Guangdong
- Coordinates: 25°08′N 113°20′E
- Country: People's Republic of China
- Province: Guangdong
- Prefecture-level city: Shaoguan

Area
  - Total: 2,421 km^{2} (935 sq mi)

Population (2020)
  - Total: 383,498
  - Density: 158.4/km^{2} (410.3/sq mi)
- Time zone: UTC+8 (China Standard)

Lechang (simplified Chinese: 乐昌; traditional Chinese: 樂昌; pinyin: Lèchāng; historically Lokchong) is a county-level city in the northern Guangdong province, People's Republic of China, bordering Hunan province to the north. It is under the administration of Shaoguan prefecture-level city.

== History ==
In the year 508, south cantilever beam of Qujiang County, the county set 598 years (Sui Kai Huang eighteen years) renamed Lechang County, Guangdong Province, to submit "on the Lechang County, county to city to consult on August 30, 1993" 1994 official county to city. It is a historic city.

In 2014, Lechang municipal bodies of nine people including members of Lechang party secretary Li, Mo Janus Lechang COMMITTEE Discipline Committee is being investigated for accepting red envelopes.

== Administrative division ==
- Lecheng Subdistrict (Lechang's main urban area)
- Pingshi Town
- Meihua Town
- Changlai Town
- Shaping Town
- Qingyun Town
- (the list is incomplete)

== Climate ==
Climate data for Lechang, elevation 143 m (469 ft), (1991–2020 normals, extremes 1967–2010)
Month	Jan	Feb	Mar	Apr	May	Jun	Jul	Aug	Sep	Oct	Nov	Dec	Year
Record high °C (°F)	26.2 (79.2)	30.5 (86.9)	33.0 (91.4)	34.0 (93.2)	35.3 (95.5)	37.9 (100.2)	41.0 (105.8)	39.7 (103.5)	38.5 (101.3)	36.5 (97.7)	32.8 (91.0)	27.5 (81.5)	41.0 (105.8)
Mean daily maximum °C (°F)	14.3 (57.7)	16.7 (62.1)	19.2 (66.6)	24.7 (76.5)	28.6 (83.5)	31.2 (88.2)	33.3 (91.9)	33.4 (92.1)	31.3 (88.3)	27.7 (81.9)	22.6 (72.7)	17.1 (62.8)	25.0 (77.0)
Daily mean °C (°F)	9.7 (49.5)	12.0 (53.6)	15.0 (59.0)	20.4 (68.7)	24.3 (75.7)	26.8 (80.2)	28.3 (82.9)	28.2 (82.8)	26.1 (79.0)	22.0 (71.6)	16.7 (62.1)	11.4 (52.5)	20.1 (68.1)
Mean daily minimum °C (°F)	6.8 (44.2)	8.9 (48.0)	12.2 (54.0)	17.3 (63.1)	21.2 (70.2)	23.9 (75.0)	24.9 (76.8)	24.8 (76.6)	22.7 (72.9)	18.0 (64.4)	12.7 (54.9)	7.7 (45.9)	16.8 (62.2)
Record low °C (°F)	−4.6 (23.7)	−1.4 (29.5)	−0.5 (31.1)	5.5 (41.9)	11.1 (52.0)	14.6 (58.3)	20.6 (69.1)	20.8 (69.4)	13.7 (56.7)	6.1 (43.0)	1.5 (34.7)	−4.1 (24.6)	−4.6 (23.7)
Average precipitation mm (inches)	63.4 (2.50)	76.6 (3.02)	138.6 (5.46)	151.9 (5.98)	219.8 (8.65)	264.7 (10.42)	176.2 (6.94)	187.2 (7.37)	96.4 (3.80)	54.1 (2.13)	53.7 (2.11)	40.0 (1.57)	1,522.6 (59.95)
Average precipitation days (≥ 0.1 mm)	11.4	12.5	17.7	16.9	18.7	19.3	15.8	15.3	11.7	5.9	7.4	7.8	160.4
Average snowy days	0.2	0.1	0	0	0	0	0	0	0	0	0	0.3	0.6
Average relative humidity (%)	77	78	81	81	81	83	80	78	76	73	75	74	78
Mean monthly sunshine hours	79.0	65.0	57.5	72.0	93.7	101.8	168.7	174.0	157.8	155.7	131.3	119.9	1,376.4
Percentage possible sunshine	24	20	15	19	23	25	40	44	43	44	40	37	31
Source: China Meteorological Administrationall-time record low
