= Guangdong Prison Administrative Bureau =

Correctional agency of Guangdong Province, China

- Simplified Chinese: 广东省监狱管理局
- Traditional Chinese: 廣東省監獄管理局
Transcriptions
Standard Mandarin
- Hanyu Pinyin: Guǎngdōngshěng jiānyù guǎnlǐ jú
Yue: Cantonese
- Jyutping: Gwong2 Dung1 Saang2 gaam1 juk6 gun2 lei5 guk6

Guangdong Prison Administrative Bureau is the correctional agency of Guangdong Province, China. It is headquartered in Baiyun District, Guangzhou. As of September 2014, Liu Fang is the head of the bureau.

As of 2015, the province has 127 prisons and detention houses.

== History ==
From the beginning of 2014 until 2015 there were a series of incidents involving illegal sentence commutations and escapes from the Guangdong prison system.

The prison in Jieyang created an online inmate information system in April 2014; this is the first such program in mainland China. In September 2014 the bureau announced that it was going to begin publishing inmate information online by the end of 2014.

== Prisons ==
Guangdong province has over 24 prisons.

- Dongguan Prison
- Guangdong Women's Prison
- Jieyang Prison
- Panyu Prison
- Shaoguan Prison

== Line of duty deaths ==
Name and rank	Chinese name	End of watch	Unit	City of incident	Cause of death
Li Ruishu	李瑞书	2010-04-16	Sihui Prison (Now known as Zhaoqing Prison)	Zhaoqing	Heart attack

== See also ==
- List of prisons in Guangdong
