= Panyu Prison =

Prison in Guangdong, China

- Location within Guangdong Province
- Location: Panyu District, Guangzhou, Guangdong Province; 23.0078°N 113.2818°E
- Status: Operational
- Opened: 1997
- Managed by: Guangdong Prison Administrative Bureau

Panyu Prison
- Simplified Chinese: 番禺监狱
- Traditional Chinese: 番禺監獄
Transcriptions
Standard Mandarin
- Hanyu Pinyin: Pānyú Jiānyù
Yue: Cantonese
- Jyutping: pun1 jyu4 gaam1 juk6

Panyu Prison (Chinese: 番禺监狱; pinyin: Pānyú Jiānyù) is a prison in Huijiang Village (会江村), Dashi Subdistrict, Panyu District, Guangzhou, Guangdong Province, China.

== History ==
The prison began accepting inmates in 1997.

== Inmate population ==
The prison reportedly began taking foreign inmates in 2009, and by 2013 housed "more than 100 foreign inmates".

== Prison SWAT ==
Panyu prison operates the Guangdong Panyu prison SWAT team (广东省番禺监狱特警队), a police tactical unit which is in charge of armed patrols in the prison perimeter, responding to high risk incidents and security. It was established in January 10, 2017 and consists of 9 full-time members and 12 part time members as of 2018. The team achieved first place in the Guangdong Prison Administrative Bureau's shooting contest.

== Transport ==
Panyu Prison is located a short walk south of Huijiang station, served by Line 2 of the Guangzhou Metro.

== See also ==
- List of prisons in Guangdong
