= ISD =

ISD may refer to:

== Schools ==
=== United States ===
- Independent school district, a type of school district
- Illinois School for the Deaf, Jacksonville, Illinois
- Independence Public School District, headquartered in Independence, Missouri
- Indiana School for the Deaf, Indianapolis, Indiana
- Interboro School District, a school district headquartered in Prospect Park, Pennsylvania, in the Philadelphia area
- Issaquah School District, a school district headquartered in Issaquah, Washington

=== Elsewhere ===
- International School of Dakar, Senegal
- International School Dhaka, Bangladesh
- International School of Düsseldorf, Germany
- International School of Dongguan, Guangdong, China
- International School of Design, Valenciennes, France

== Organizations ==
- Industrial Union of Donbas, Ukrainian corporation
- Information Services Department of the Hong Kong Government
- Information Services Division of NHS National Services Scotland
- Institute for Strategic Dialogue, London-based international affairs think tank
- Internal Security Department (Singapore) of the Republic of Singapore
- Internal Security Department (Brunei) of Brunei
- Team ISD, professional cycling team

== Other ==
- Inhibited sexual desire, old name for hypoactive sexual desire disorder
- In-school detention
- Instructional systems design, also known as instructional design
- International Subscriber Dialling, also known as International Direct Dialling
- Integrated Surface Database, global surface weather observations
