= Xiping West railway station =

Intercity railway station in Dongguan, Guangdong, China

Xipingxi 西平西
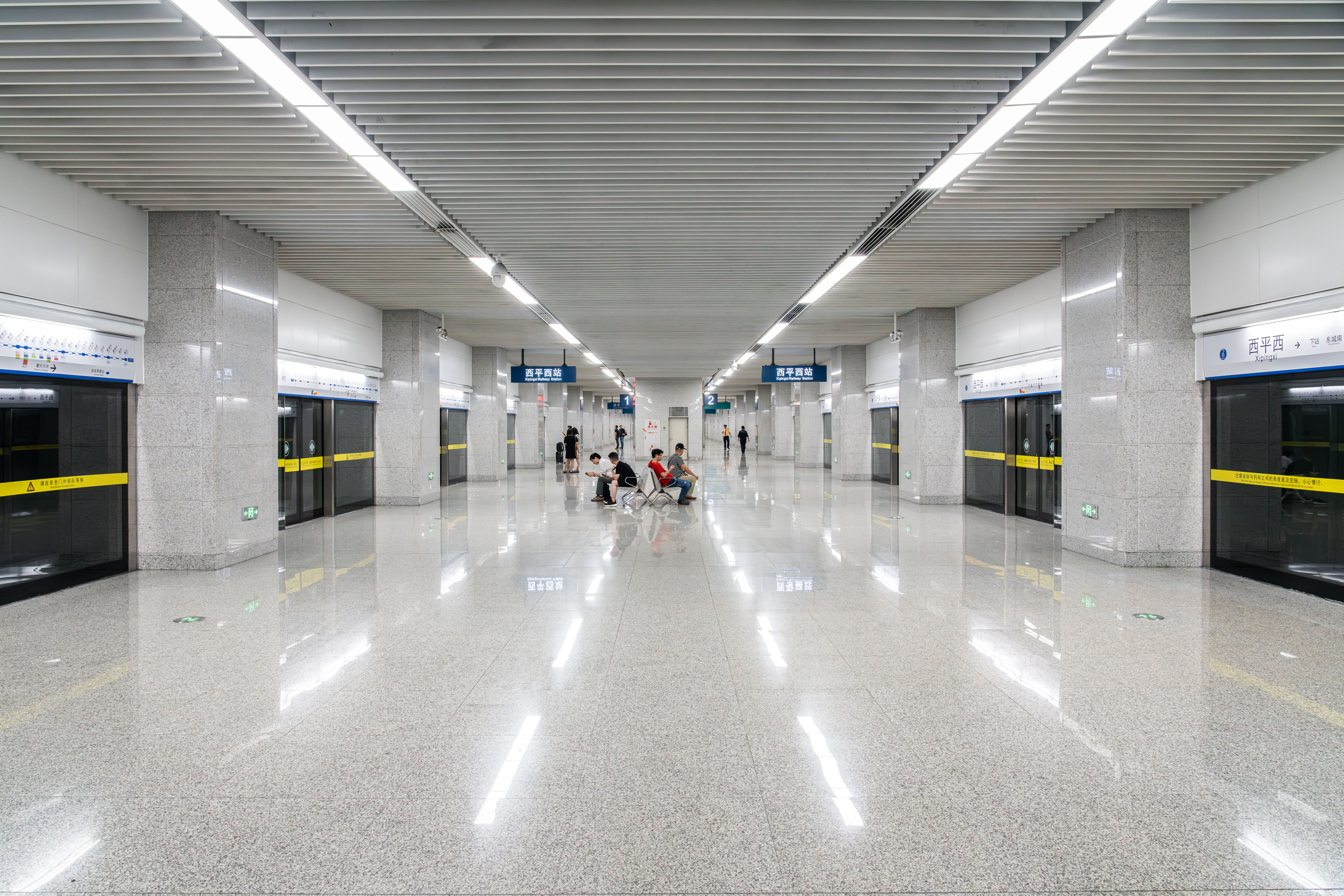
- Platform

Chinese name
- Chinese: 西平西站
Transcriptions
Standard Mandarin
- Hanyu Pinyin: Xīpíng Xī Zhàn
Yue: Cantonese
- Yale Romanization: Sāipìng Sāi Jaahm
- Jyutping: Sai^{1}ping^{4} Sai^{1} Zaam^{6}

General information
- Location: Intersection of Dongguan Boulevard (东莞大道) and Dongqi Road (东启路), Nancheng Subdistrict, Dongguan, Guangdong; China
- Coordinates: 23°0′5″N 113°44′18″E
- Owner: Pearl River Delta Metropolitan Region intercity railway
- Operator: Guangdong Intercity
- Line: Guangzhou–Huizhou intercity railway
- Platforms: 2 (1 island platform)
- Tracks: 2
- Connections: 2 Xiping

Construction
- Structure type: Underground
- Accessible: Yes

Other information
- Station code: EGQ (Pinyin: XPX)

History
- Opened: 28 December 2017 (8 years ago)

Services
Preceding station	Pearl River Delta Metropolitan Region Intercity Railway	Following station
Daojiao towards Panyu	Guangzhou–Huizhou intercity railway	Dongcheng South towards Huizhou North
Transfer at Xiping
Preceding station	Dongguan Rail Transit	Following station
Gedi towards Humen Railway Station	Line 2 transfer at Xiping	Hongfu Road towards Dongguan Railway Station
Location

Xiping West railway station (Chinese: 西平西站; pinyin: Xīpíng Xī Zhàn; Cantonese Yale: Sāipìng Sāi Jaahm) is a railway station in Nancheng Subdistrict, Dongguan, Guangdong, China. It opened on 28 December 2017.

== Station structure and entrances/exits ==
The station has 3 points of entry/exit, lettered A-C. Currently only Exit B is open, and it is accessible via elevator.

There is a reservation for a direct transfer with the platform of Xiping station of Dongguan Rail Transit Line 2 at the end of the station platform in the future, but it is currently sealed by a false wall, which means the current means of transfer is via the concourse transfer passageway.

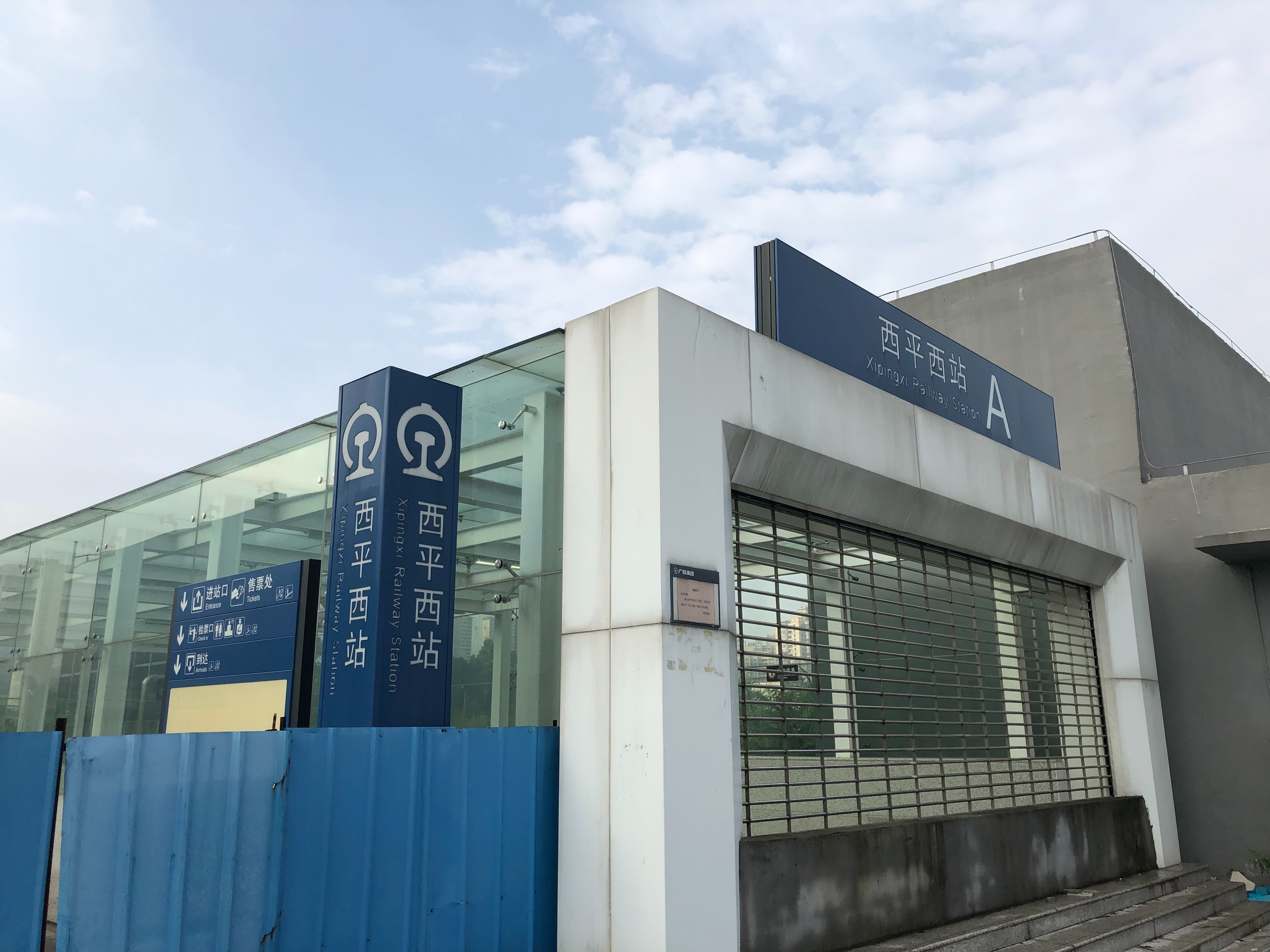
Entrance A (not open)

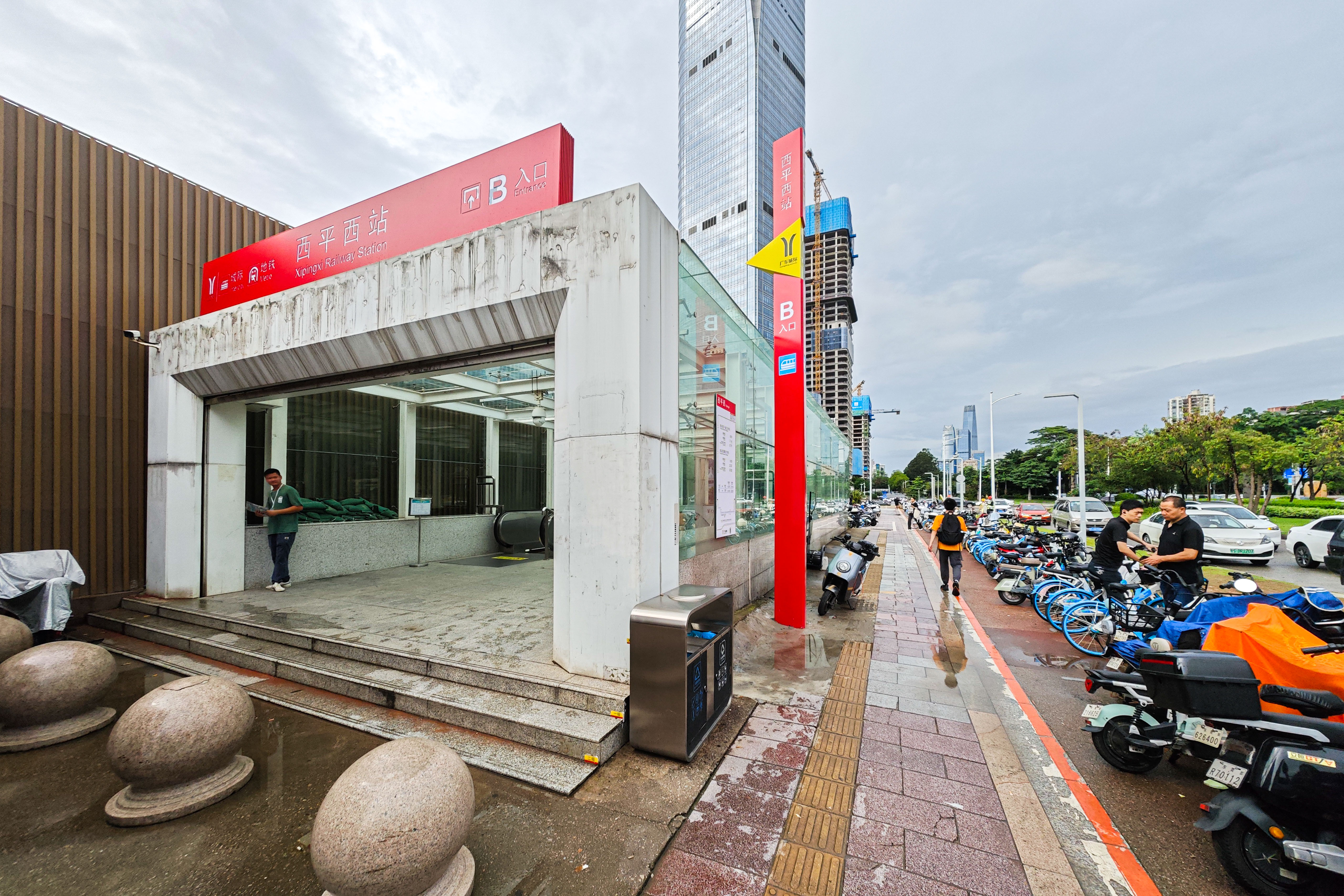
Entrance B

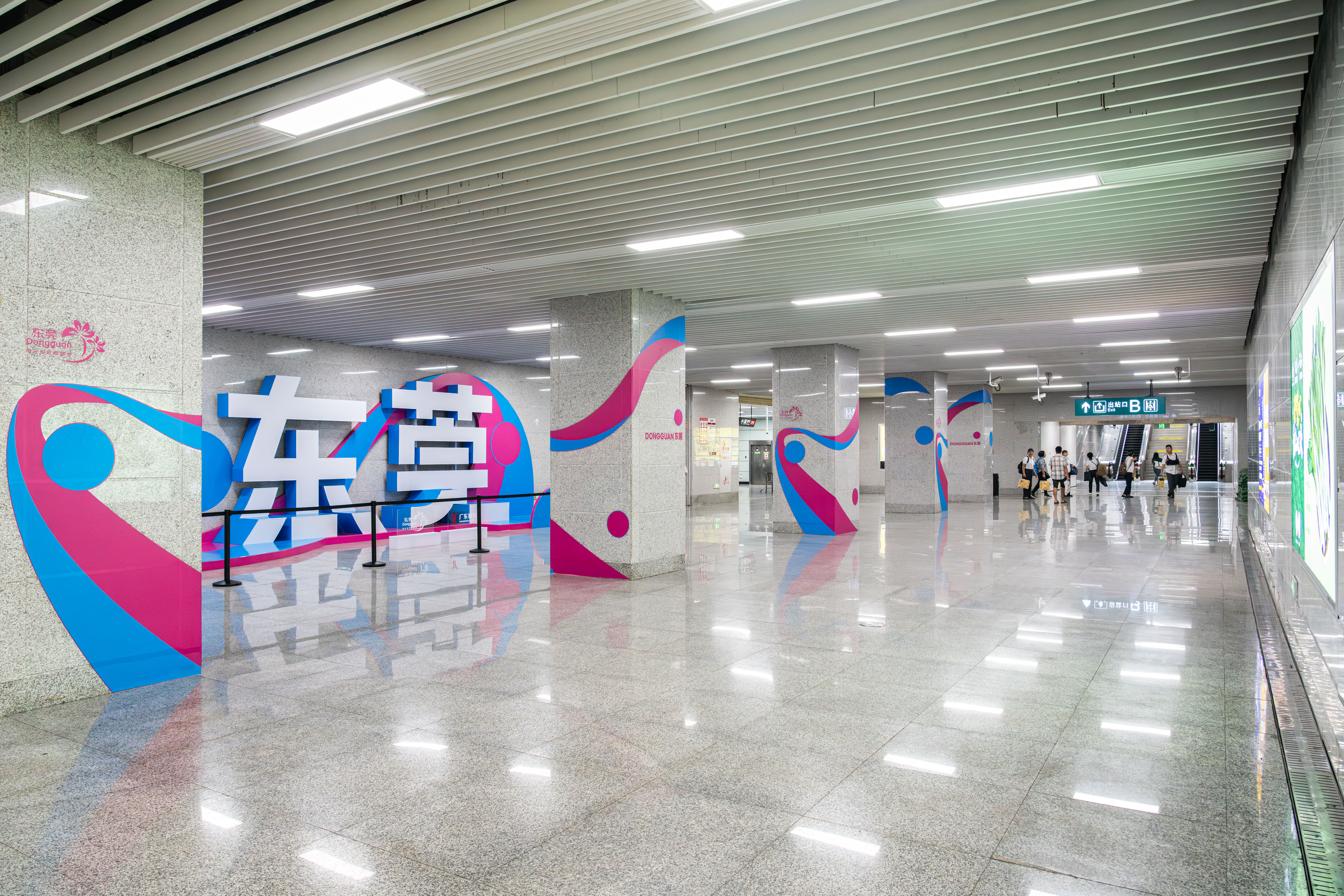
Transfer passage

== Transfer ==
There is a transfer passageway connecting to Dongguan Rail Transit Xiping station, and passengers can easily transfer from the concourse, but security checks will need to be conducted.

== Gallery ==
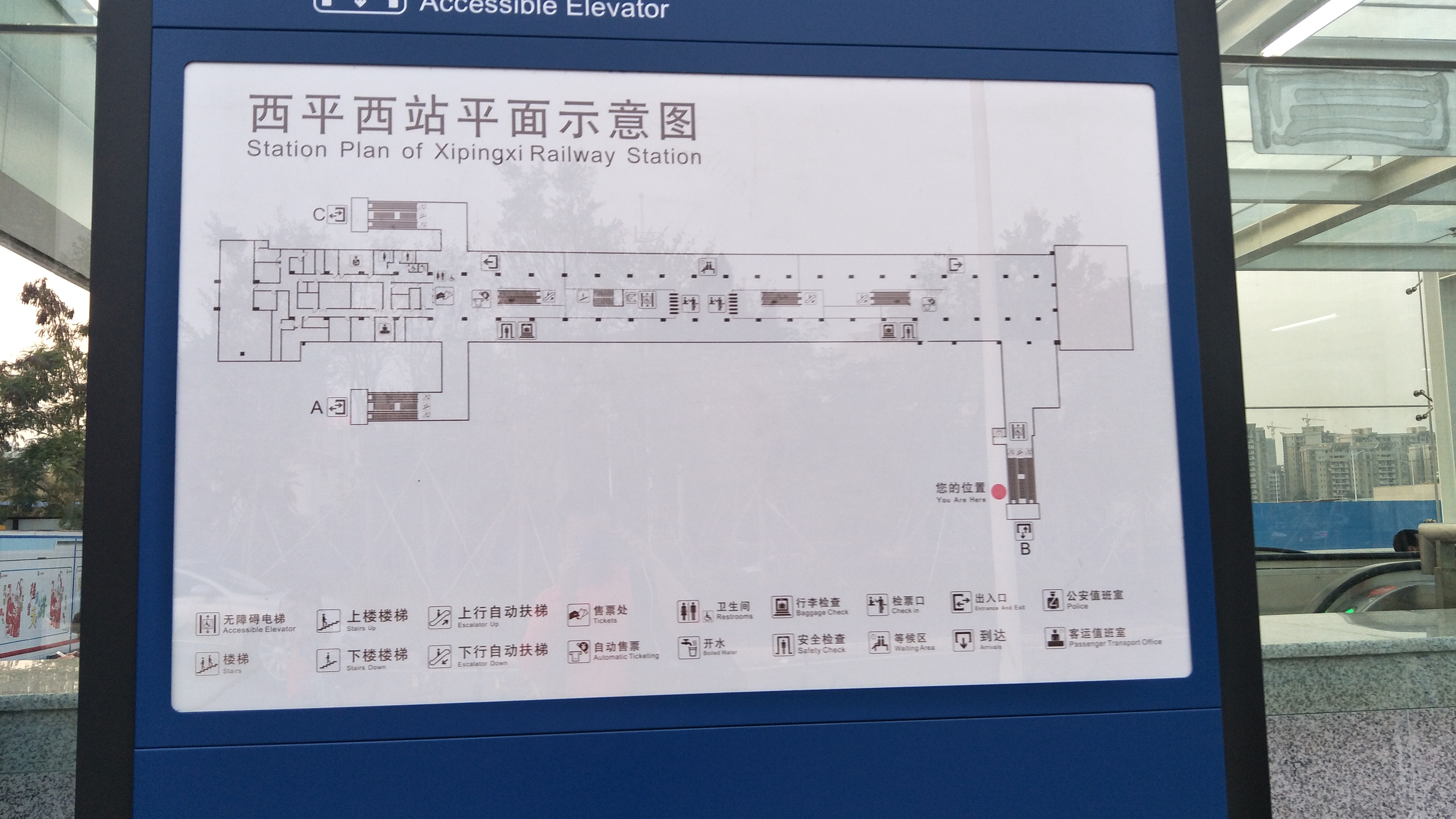
Station diagram

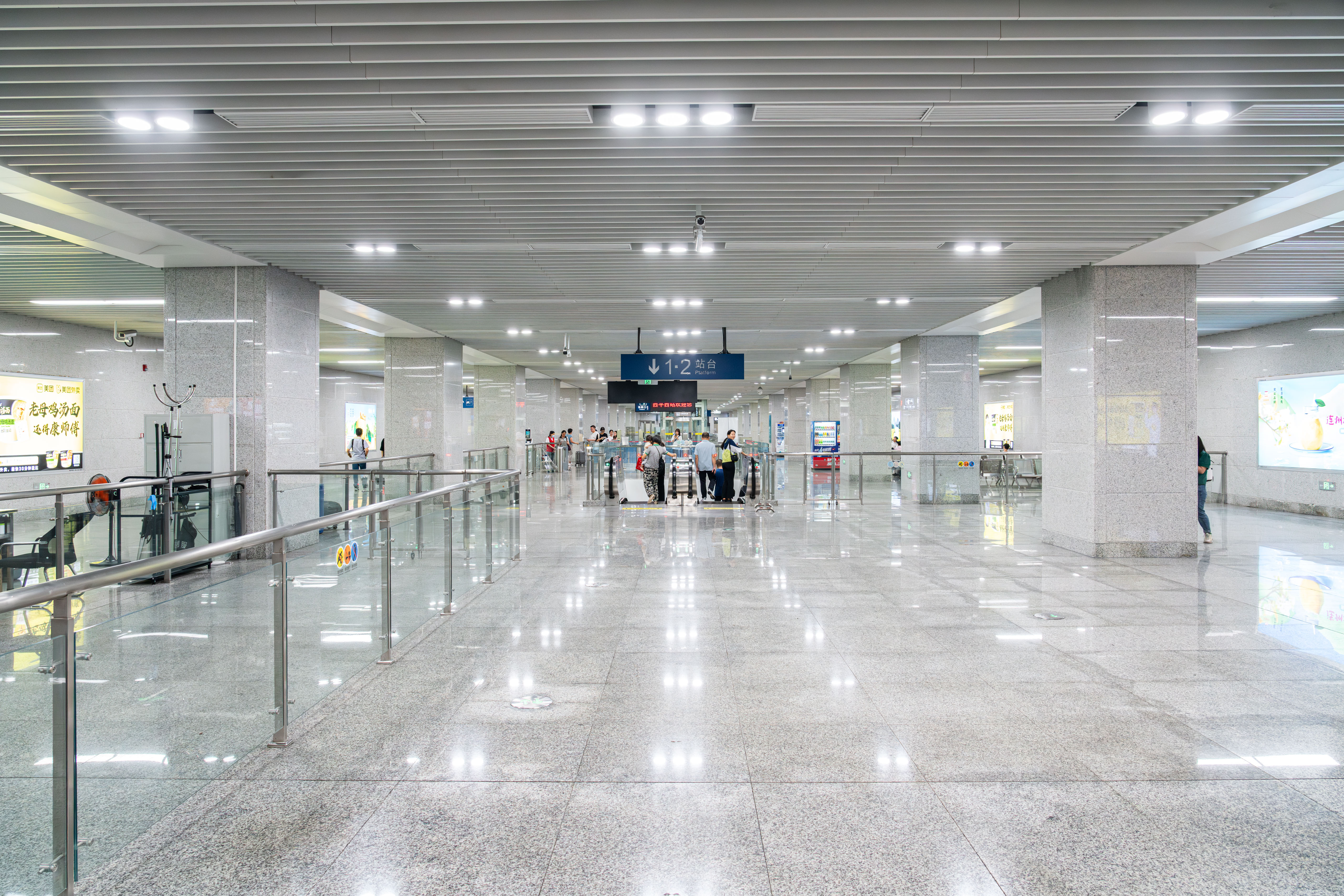
Concourse

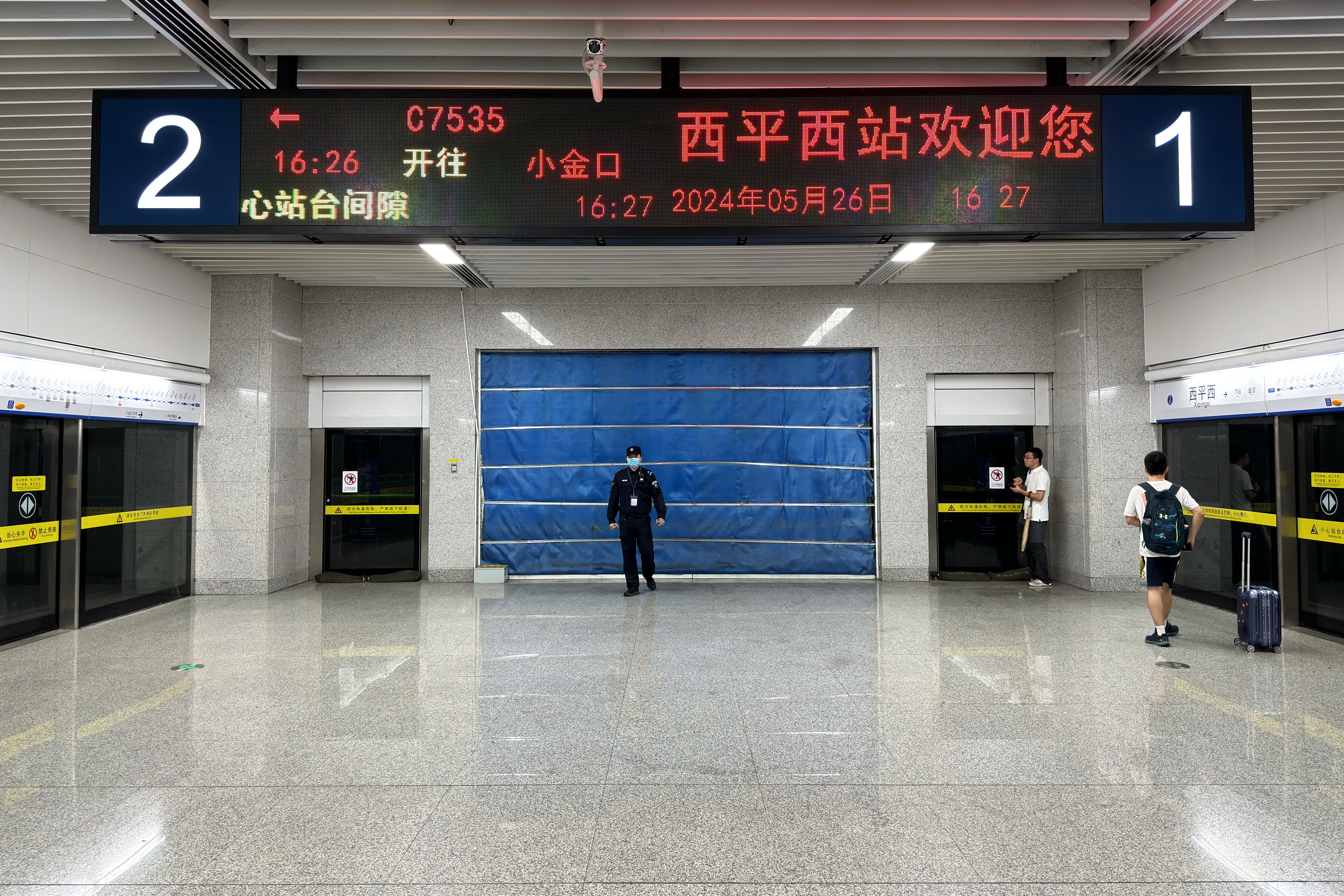
Closed-off platform transfer passageway at the end of platform

== History ==
In the early stage of Guangzhou–Huizhou intercity railway planning, there was an elevated station called Dongguan Boulevard on the northwest side of Shuilianshan Reservoir. In 2010, after the Ministry of Railways intervened in the construction of the Pearl River Delta Metropolitan Region intercity railway, the line scheme was redesigned. Finally, at the suggestion of Dongguan City and the towns and streets along the line, in order to avoid cutting the urban planning and avoid ecologically sensitive points such as Shuilian Mountain Forest Park and Tongsha Forest Park, the Dongguan urban area, Liaobu and Changping sections were changed from elevated to underground, so the station was adjusted to the underground Xincheng Center Station (also known as Dongguan Xincheng Station) and shifted northeast to the current site. In February 2012, the site was officially excavated.

Since the name of the project "Xincheng Center Station" is superimposed and does not conform to the railway naming rules, and "Nancheng Station" and "Xiping Station" have been occupied by other stations, the station was named Xiping West at the end of 2015. On 28 December 2017, the station was opened with the opening of the southern section of Dongguan–Huizhou Intercity (now Guangzhou–Huizhou Intercity Railway) between Daojiao and Changping South.

The station was operated by China Railway Guangzhou Group when it was opened, and was transferred to Guangdong Intercity on 23 January 2024.

== Usage ==
The station is located in the CBD of Dongguan New Town, and is the only station in the Dongguan–Huizhou section that can be connected to urban rail transit, and has performed well in passenger flow since its opening, and is the station with the highest passenger flow in the Dongguan–Huizhou section. In May 2024, after the Guanghui Intercity and Guangzhao Intercity lines were put into operation, it attracted a large number of cross-city passengers to take trains at this station, and this station has become the station with the highest passenger flow among the five cities spanned by the two lines.
