= Xiping station =

Metro station in Dongguan, China

Xiping 西平
- Platform to Dongguan Railway Station

General information
- Location: Dongguan Road and Dongguan Avenue Intersection, Dongguan, Guangdong; China
- Coordinates: 22.99689°N 113.74127°E
- Operator: Dongguan Rail Transit Corporation, Limited
- Line: Line 2
- Platforms: 2 (1 island platform)
- Tracks: 2
- Connections: Xiping West railway station

Construction
- Structure type: Underground
- Accessible: Yes

Other information
- Station code: 209

History
- Opened: 27 May 2016; 10 years ago

Services
| Preceding station | Dongguan Rail Transit | Following station |
|---|---|---|
| Gedi towards Humen Railway Station | Line 2 | Civic Center towards Dongguan Railway Station |
Transfer at Xiping West
| Preceding station | Pearl River Delta Metropolitan Region Intercity Railway | Following station |
| Daojiao towards Panyu | Guangzhou–Huizhou intercity railway transfer at Xiping West | Dongcheng South towards Huizhou North |
Location

Xiping Station (Chinese: 西平站) is a metro station on Line 2 of the Dongguan Rail Transit in Dongguan, China. It opened on 27 May 2016. Since 28 December 2017, it has interchanged with the Dongguan–Huizhou intercity railway at Xiping West railway station.

== Station Platform ==
G
| G | Entrance |

| L1; Concourse | Station Hall | Vending machine, Customer service |
| L2; Platforms | | 2 towards Dongguan railway station (Civic Center) |
| L2; Platforms | Island platform, doors will open on the left |
| L2; Platforms | | 2 towards Humen railway station (Gedi) |
