= Dongguan Nancheng =

Dongguan Nancheng may also refer to:

- Nancheng Subdistrict, Dongguan, a subdistrict of Dongguan, Guangdong province, China
- Dongguan Nancheng F.C., a professional Chinese football club based at Nancheng Subdistrict
