= Guancheng Subdistrict =

Guancheng 莞城街道
- Subdistrict
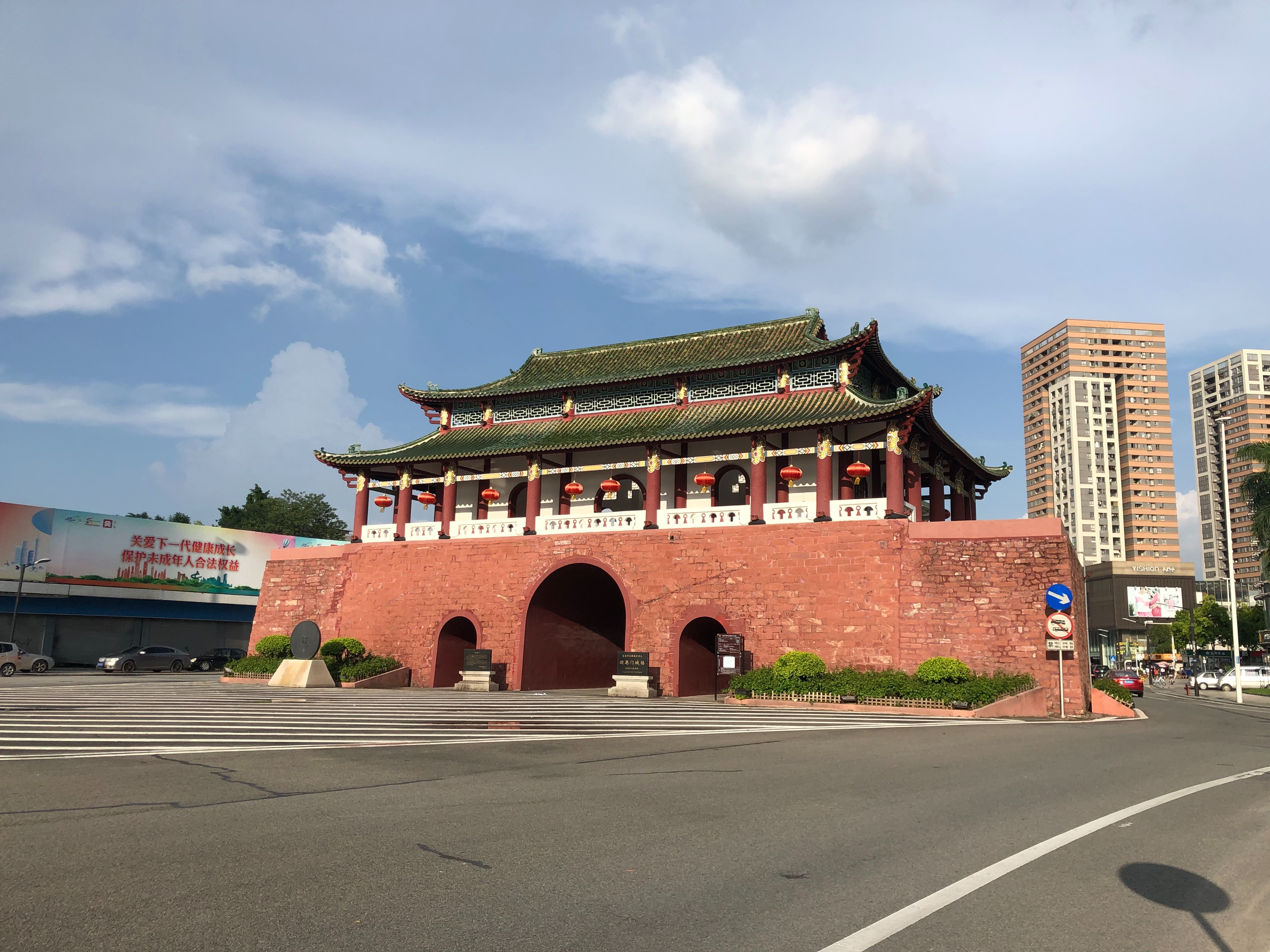
- Ying'en Gate in Guancheng Subdistrict

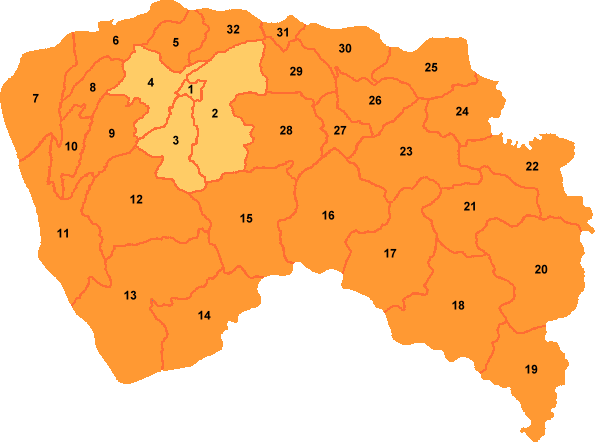
- Guancheng is labeled '1' on this map of Dongguan

- Dongguan in Guangdong
- Country: People's Republic of China
- Province: Guangdong
- Prefecture-level city: Dongguan

Area
  - Total: 11.16 km^{2} (4.31 sq mi)

Population (2013)
  - Total: 165,800
  - Density: 14,860/km^{2} (38,480/sq mi)

GDP
  - Total: ¥ 21.595 billion (2019)
- Time zone: UTC+8 (China Standard)
- Postal code: 523001, 523002, 523003, 523004, 523005, 523006, 523007, 523008
- Website: guancheng.dg.gov.cn/index.php/c.html

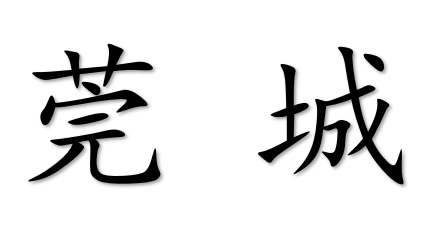
Guancheng in Chinese, above, means "City of Scirpus", a genus of sedge.

Guancheng Subdistrict (Chinese: 莞城街道; pinyin: Guǎnchéng Jiēdào; lit. 'Dongguan City's seat') is a subdistrict in Guangdong Province, China under the administration of Dongguan City. It has an area of 11.16 square kilometres (4.31 sq mi), and a residential population of 230,000, of which 152,000 are new residents.

Guancheng was the old political and cultural centre of Dongguan, before the government moved to the new centre in the Nancheng Subdistrict.

== History ==
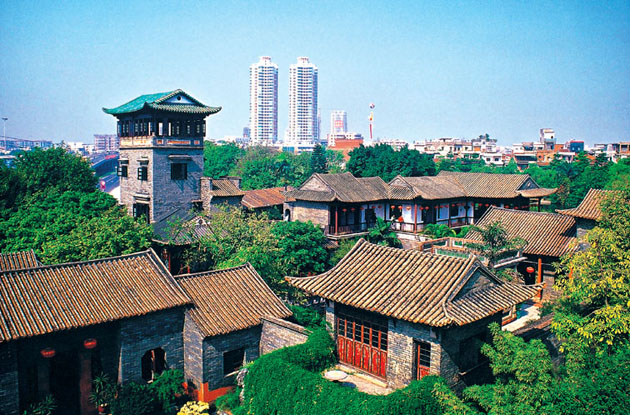
Ke Yuan (可园)

Guancheng Subdistrict has been home to the seat of Dongguan's government since the year 757, during the early Tang Dynasty.

In the late 14th century, during the reign of the Hongwu Emperor of the Ming Dynasty, the Ying'enmen Gate Tower was built within present-day Guancheng. Later in the Ming Dynasty, the Quejinting Monument was built to commemorate the city's trade with Thailand.

Upon the founding of the People's Republic of China in 1949, Guancheng was designated as a city. Guancheng was re-designated as a people's commune from 1958 to 1980.

In January 1988, Dongguan was upgraded to a prefecture-level city.

== Geography ==
Located near the center of Dongguan, the Guancheng Subdistrict encompasses the historic center of the city. The subdistrict lies 59 kilometers away from Guangzhou, 99 kilometers from Shenzhen, and 140 kilometers from Hong Kong.

Guancheng Subdistrict is bordered by Dongcheng Subdistrict, Nancheng Subdistrict, and Wanjiang Subdistrict.

== Administrative divisions ==
Guancheng Subdistrict is divided into 8 residential communities: Dongzheng Residential Community (东正社区), Shiqiao Residential Community (市桥社区), Beiyu Residential Community (北隅社区), Xiyu Residential Community (西隅社区), Luosha Residential Community (罗沙社区), Bosha Residential Community (博厦社区), Xingtang Residential Community (兴塘社区), and Chuangye Residential Community (创业社区).

== Politics ==
Guancheng Subdistrict used to be the political center of Dongguan City. The following is the list of political office-holders of Guancheng Subdistrict:

Name	Position	Division of Work
Liu Linhong (刘林宏)	Party secretary, Director of the Liaison Committee of the NPC	Total authority
Chen Huizhen (陈慧贞)	Vice party secretary, Director of the Office	Responsible for the economic work
Zhang Ruijun (张锐均)	Vice party secretary	In charge of political science, law, social security and social stability
Ma Xiaoqi (马小其)	Member of the Party Committee, Secretary of Commission for Discipline Inspection	In charge of discipline, supervision and auditing work
Wu Zhi'en (吴志恩)	Member of the Party Committee, NPC deputy director of the Liaison Committee	In charge of construction of the party, organization, personnel, Office of the NPC
Ye Haodian (叶浩钿)	Member of the Party Committee	Adjunct director of the Public Security Bureau
Zhang Junhua (张俊华)	Member of the Party Committee	In charge of business circulation and urban construction
Peng Lei (彭 雷)	Member of the Party Committee	In charge of health and family planning
Zhang Kaiqiang (张凯强)	Member of the Party Committee	In charge of finance, banking and asset management
Ye Xiaomin (叶小敏)	Member of the Party Committee	In charge of community work, social affairs and responsible for daily work and Social Work Committee
Li Hangxu (李航旭)	Member of the Party Committee	In charge of safety production, trade, science and technology
Chen Yudong (陈玉东)	Member of the Party Committee	Served as armed forces minister, in charge of environmental protection work
Liang Feng (梁 丰)	Deputy Director of the Office	In charge of urban management, utilities, three defenses and agricultural work
Yu Haihua (余海花)	Deputy Director of the Office	In charge of education and the work of the Women's Federation
Chen Haorong (陈浩荣)	Deputy Director of the Office	In charge of the construction of spiritual civilization, publicity, culture, sports and tourism
Kuang Hanqiang (邝汉强)	Deputy Director of the Office	In charge of private enterprises, Chamber of Commerce and the Food and Drug Supervision and Management Bureau
Yan Zheng (严 正)	Deputy Director of the Office	In charge of Party and government office, planning project and urban planning work
Chen Jinrong (陈金荣)	NPC deputy director of the Liaison Committee	In charge of poverty alleviation and trade union work

== Economy ==
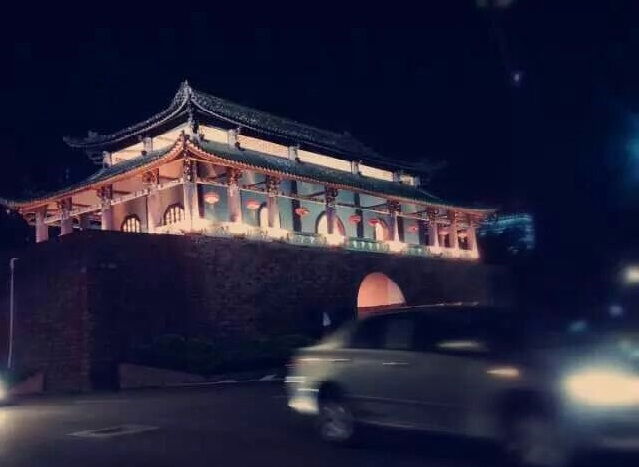
The night view of Ying'en Men in West Gate Avenue of Guancheng Subdistrict.

As of 2019, the subdistrict's GDP totaled ¥21.595 billion, fixed asset investment totaled ¥2.946 billion, retail sales totaled ¥13.440 billion, and the subdistrict's tax revenue totaled ¥4.581 billion.

Guancheng Subdistrict's three major business districts are: West Gate Avenue (西城门大街), Diwang Square (地王广场), and Yujing Square CBD (愉景广场商圈).

== Education ==
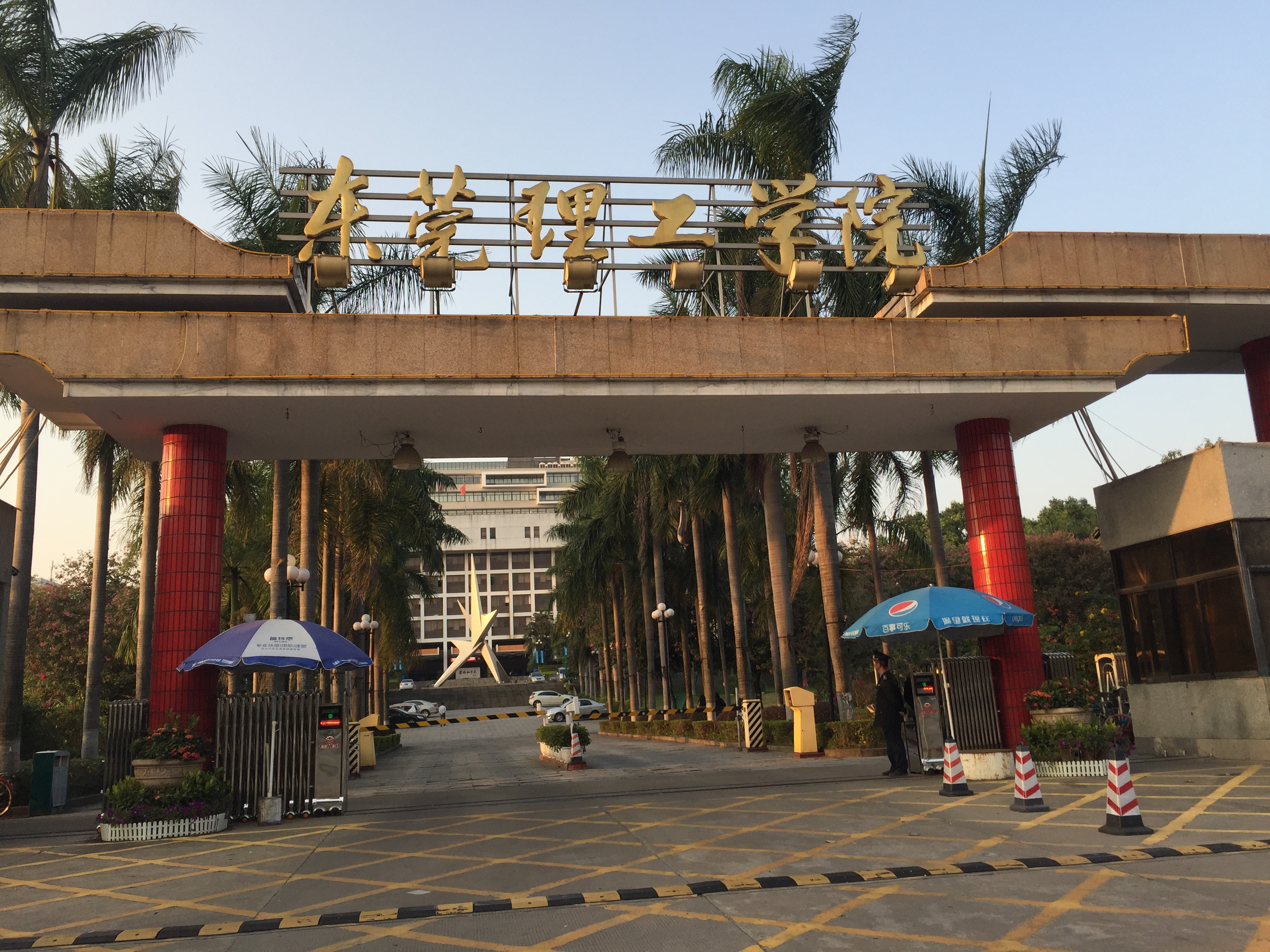
The schoolgate of DGUT.

Within Guancheng Subdistrict, there is 1 undergraduate university, 3 vocational secondary schools, 3 standard secondary schools, 1 technical vocational school, 1 special education school, 8 primary schools, 7 kindergartens, 1 sports academy, and 17 private schools.

Notable educational institutions within Guancheng Subdistrict include:

- Dongguan University of Technology's Guangcheng Campus
- Dongguan Middle School (东莞中学)
- Dongguan Experimental High School (东莞实验中学)
- Dongguan Middle School - Junior High School (东莞中学初中部)
- Dongguan Keyuan High School (东莞市可园中学)
- Dongguan Bubugao Primary School (东莞市步步高小学)
- Guancheng Construction of Primary School (莞城建设小学)
- Guancheng Experimental Primary School (莞城实验小学)
- Guancheng Central Primary School (莞城中心小学)

== Healthcare ==
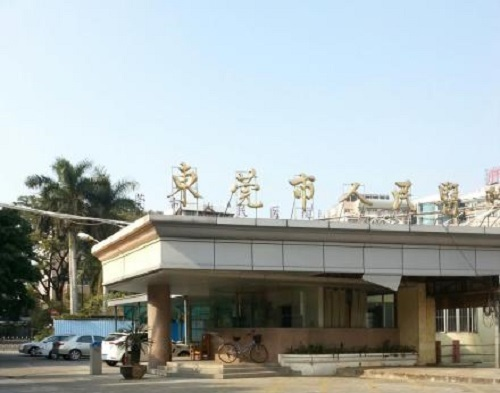
Dongguan People's Hospital in Guancheng Subdistrict (东莞人民医院莞城旧址)

Guancheng Subdistrict is the center for medical and health services in Dongguan City. There are many large integrated medical institutions, including:

- Dongguan People's Hospital (东莞市人民医院)
- Dongguan Traditional Chinese Medical Hospital (东莞市中医院)
- Dongguan People's Hospital of Guancheng Subdistrict (莞城人民医院)
- Guancheng Hospital (莞城医院)
- Dongguan Maria's Maternity Hospital (东莞玛利亚妇产医院)

== Cultural attractions ==
- Ke Yuan (可园), a famous garden in Guangdong.
- Quejinting Monument, located on the corner of Jiaochang Road and Guangming Road, is a stele which was built in 1541. The monument pays tribute to Li Kai, a local businessman and political figure who, as the county magistrate of nearby Panyu County, who became famous for good relations with Thailand. This stele was made from bluestone with a hard texture. The stele is 143 centimetres (56 in) long, 30 centimetres (12 in) wide and 20 centimetres (7.9 in) high with a red-sandstone rectangular base.

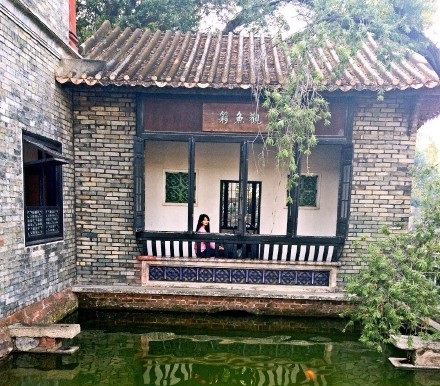
Daosheng Park (莞城道生园)

- Ouge Pavilion (讴歌亭), Established 1921, Ouge Pavilion lies on the west side of Yu Mountain in Dongguan People's Park. The arbours sitting southeast-to-northwest, 7.7 metres (25 ft) wide, 6.5 metres (21 ft) deep and 7.8 metres (26 ft) high. Ouge Arbours was in honour of Huang Chunlin, the head of Dongguan County, and was built by the local people to mark the many good works he did. In 2008, the managers of the park repaired the arbours according to its original sample and installed stone tables and stools for tourists.
- Daosheng Park (道生园)

Daosheng Park was built by Zhang Jiamo, the nephew of Ke Yuan founder Zhang Jingxiu. It stands in Daofu Alley of Guancheng Subdistrict. The whole park sat northwest-to-southeast. Ju Chao (居巢) and Ju Lian (居廉) have lived in this park for about 10 years, where they founded the Ling-nan School of painters. The original area of Daosheng Park was about 750 kilometers. However, after hundreds of years, there were only several old and shabby houses.

== Gallery ==
Guancheng Subdistrict is the Old Town of Dongguan City. Here are some of its sights:

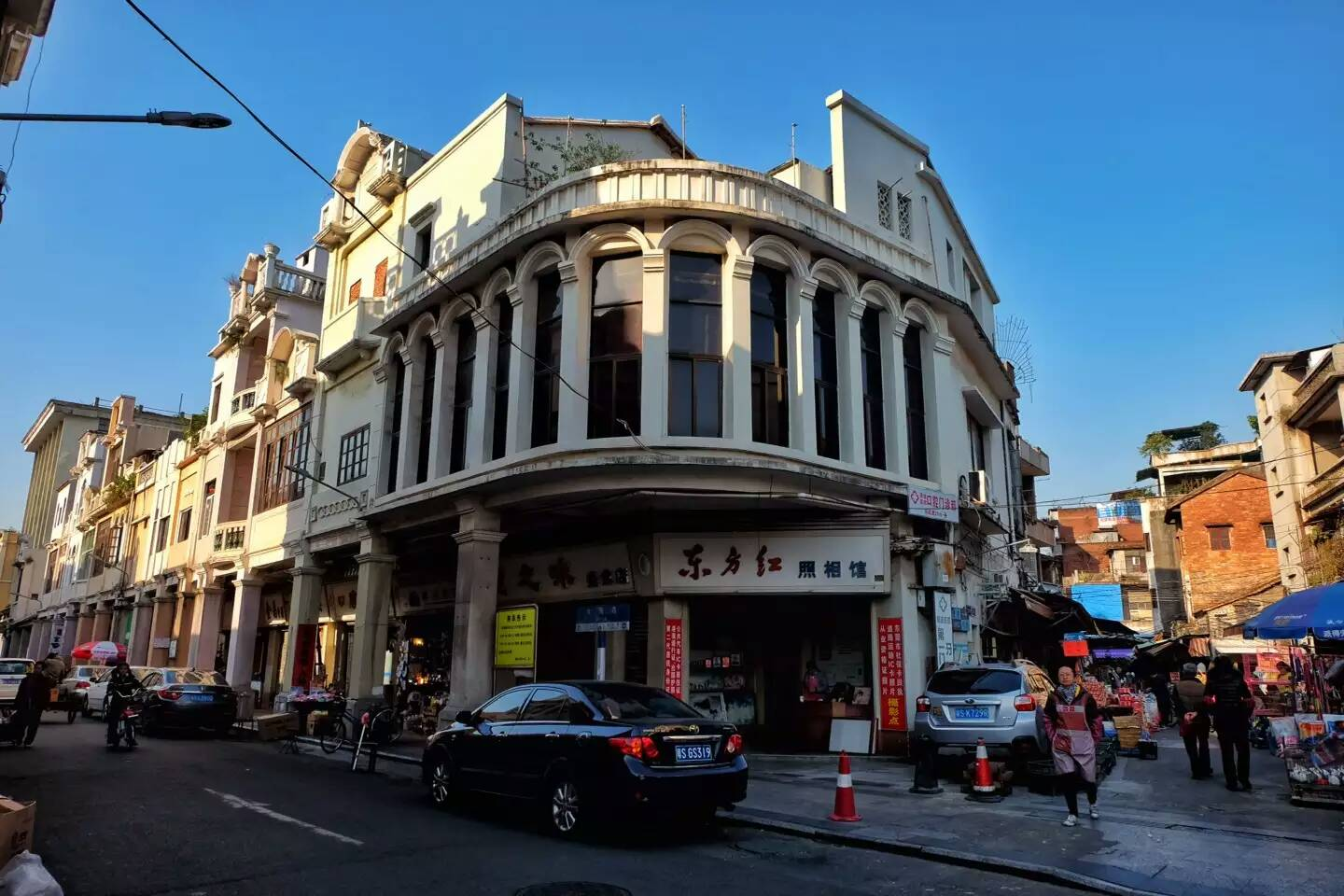
Zhenhua Road 振华路

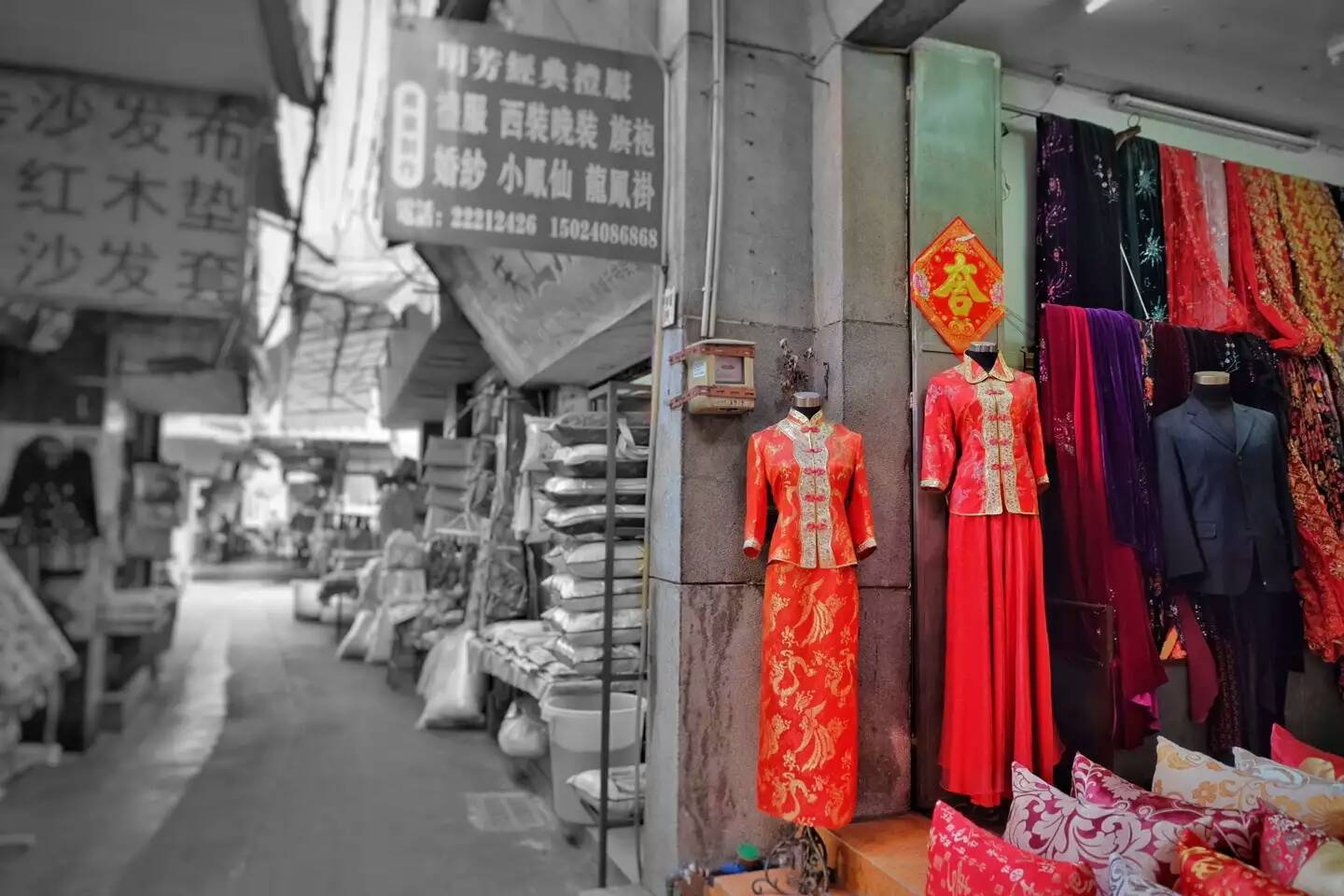
Old Business Street 莞城旧式商业街

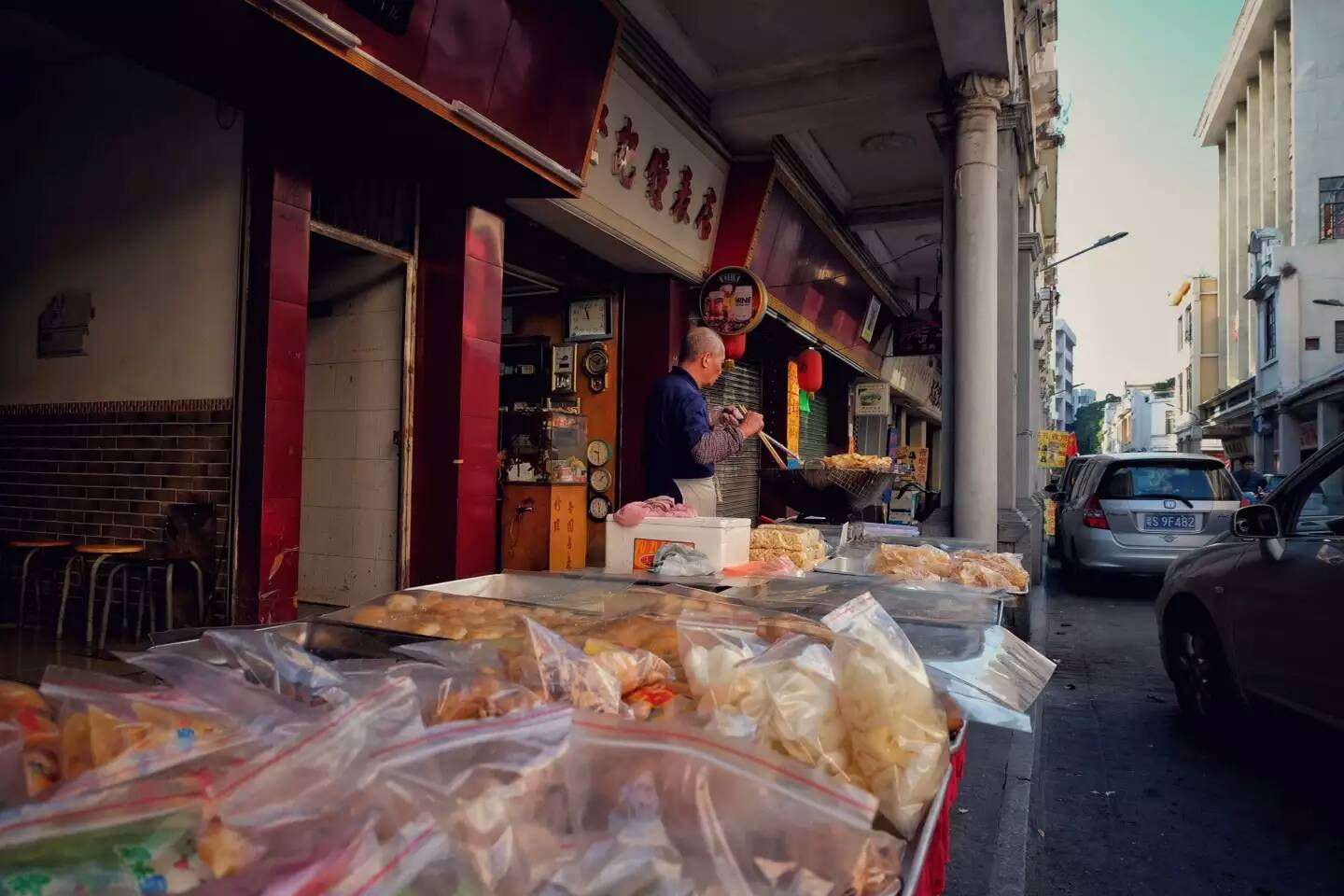
Traditional Snacks in Dongguan 东莞传统小吃

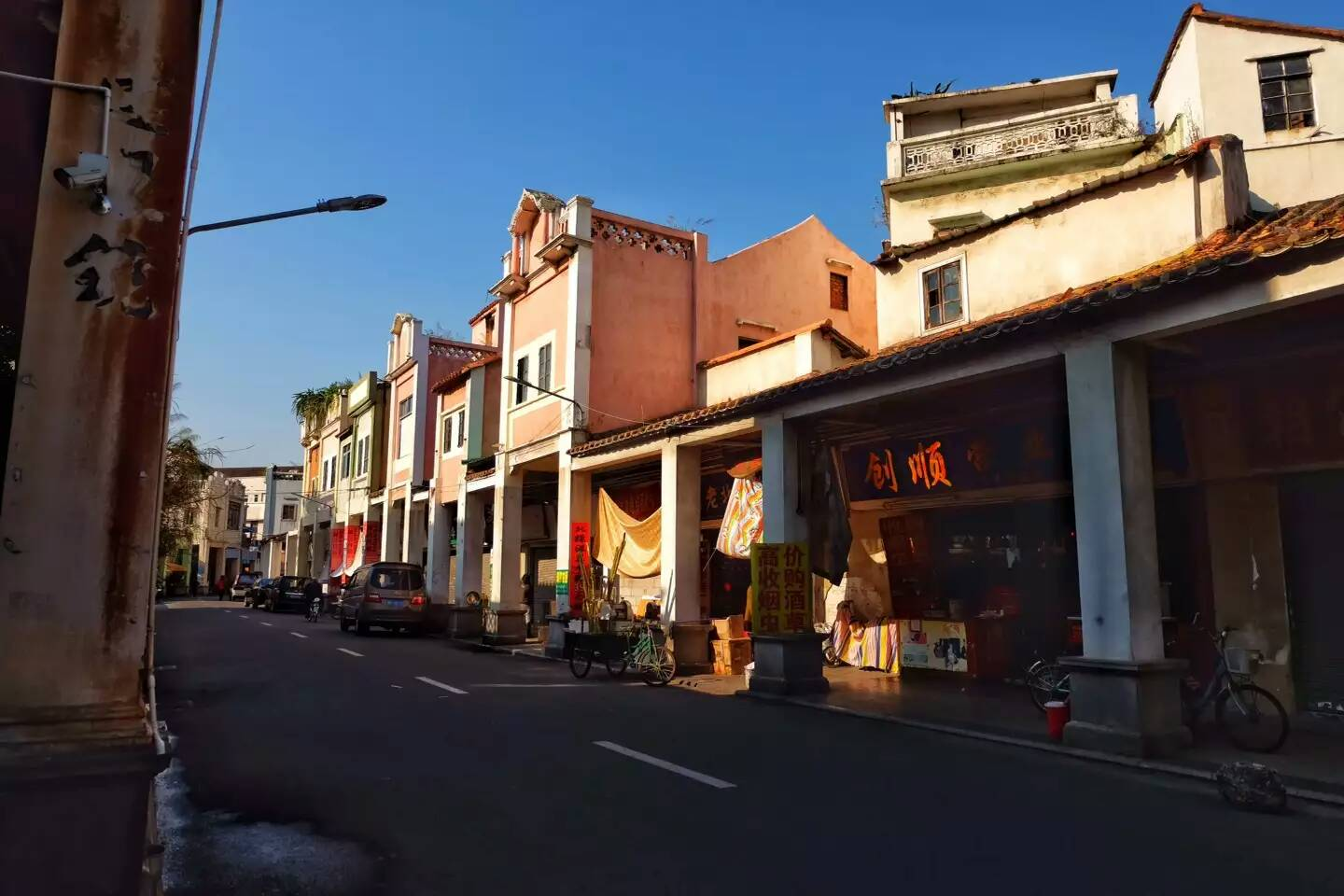
Arcades in Guancheng Subdistrict 莞城骑楼

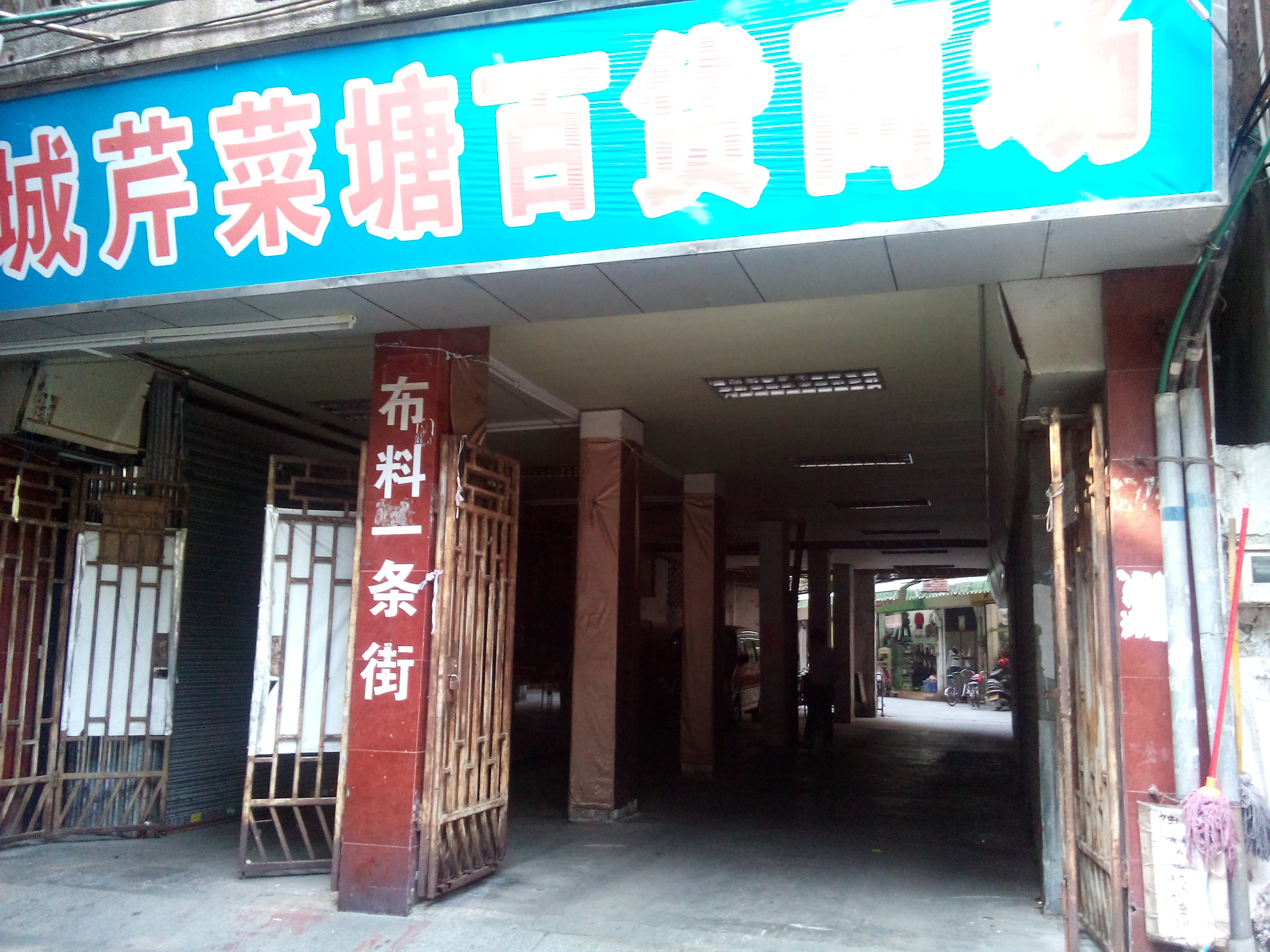
Qincai Tang Commercial Market 莞城芹菜塘商贸市场

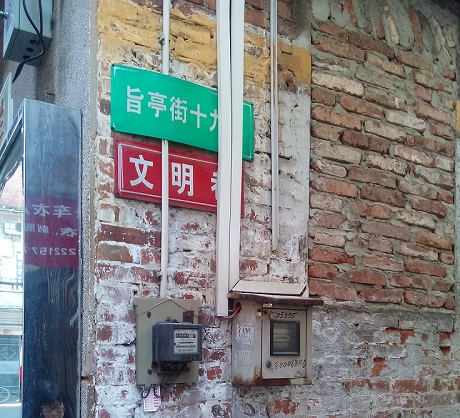
Zhiting Street 旨亭街（旨亭街排骨饭）

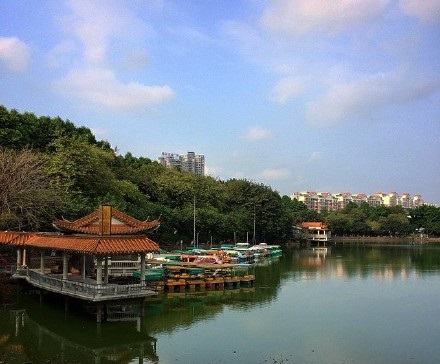
Dongguan People's Park 东莞人民公园
