= Tianbao Station =

Tianbao station may refer to:

- Tianbao station (Dongguan Rail Transit)
- Tianbao station (Nanjing Metro)
