= Dongcheng station =

Metro station in Dongguan, China

Dongcheng 东城
- Platform to Humen Railway Station

General information
- Location: Dongcheng Middle Road and Expo Square Intersection, Dongguan, Guangdong; China
- Coordinates: 23°2′8.45″N 113°46′17.9″E
- Operator: Dongguan Rail Transit Corporation, Limited
- Line: Line 2
- Platforms: Island platform

Other information
- Station code: 206

History
- Opened: 27 May 2016
Location

Dongcheng Station (Chinese: 东城站) is a metro station on Line 2 of the Dongguan Rail Transit in Dongguan, China. It opened on 27 May 2016.

== Station Platform ==
Ground level
Ground level	Entrance

(B1)	Hall	Vending machine, Customer service
(B2)		← Line 2 toward Dongguan railway station (Tianbao)
(B2)	Island platform, doors will open on the left
(B2)		→ Line 2 toward Humen railway station (Qifeng Park) →

Preceding station	Dongguan Rail Transit	Following station
Qifeng Park towards Humen Railway Station	Line 2	Tianbao towards Dongguan Railway Station
