= Keyuan =

Coordinates: 23.043035°N 113.744019°E

Keyuan (simplified Chinese: 东莞可园; traditional Chinese: 東莞可園; pinyin: Dōngguǎn kěyuán; Jyutping: Dung^{1}gun^{2} Ho^{2}jyun^{2}; lit. 'Dongguan Ke Garden'), located at Boxia (博厦), Guancheng District, West Dongguan city, is one of the Four Great Gardens of Guangdong in China. Ke Yuan represents the Lingnan garden architecture.

Keyuan was built during the Qing Dynasty by Zhang Jingxiu. Construction was completed in 1850. After that, Keyuan has been expanded and reconstructed a few times.

Zhang Jingxiu was first and second assigned as Anchashi (按察使) of the Guangxi and Jiangxi provinces by a Qing dynasty emperor. (A Qing officer rank which corresponds to a vice governor nowadays.) After he retired and returned to his home town Dongguan he lived in Keyuan. Zhang was good at and fond of Chinese writing, painting, chess, poetry, antiquing, stone collecting, etc. He invited friends, poets, scholars and painters to gather in Keyuan. And that's how Keyuan became one of the origins of Guangdong culture.

Compared with the other three gardens, the significance of Ke Yuan is far beyond just being a private own garden. Keyuan could be considered the origin of Lingnan culture, for example, the famous lingnan style painting (a major branch of Chinese painting) was originated in Keyuan.

== Image gallery ==
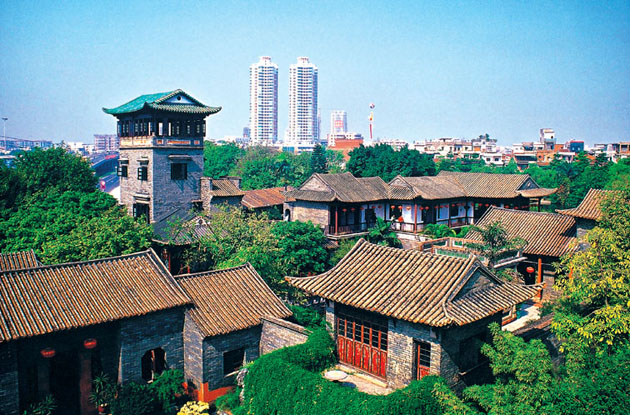
Dongguan Keyuan

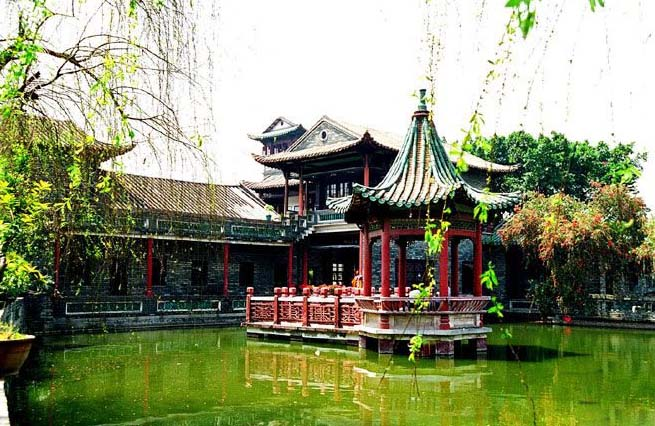
Dongguan Keyuan

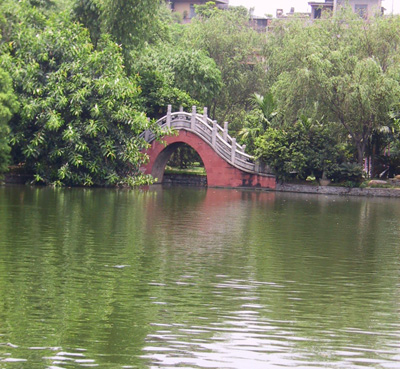
Dongguan Keyuan

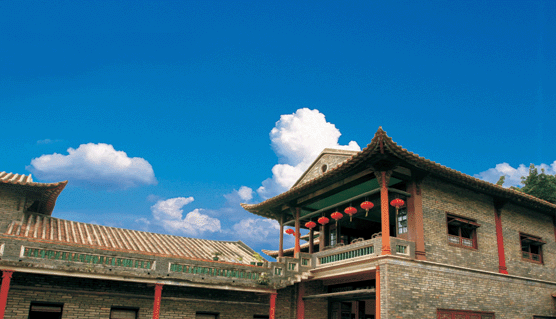
Dongguan Keyuan

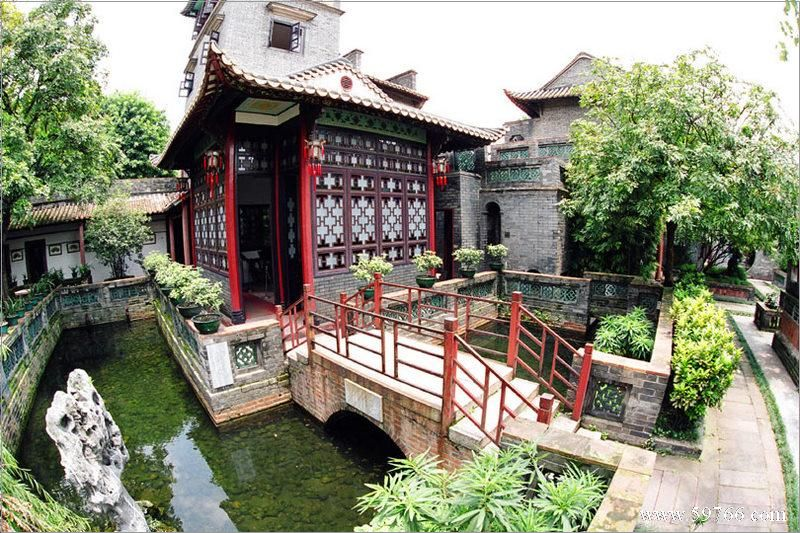
Dongguan Keyuan

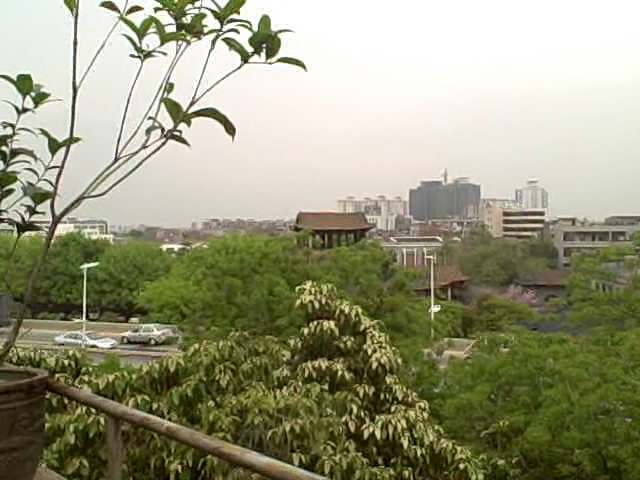
A view of Keyuan

== See also ==
- List of Chinese gardens
