= Qifeng Park station =

Metro station in Dongguan, China

Qifeng Park 旗峰公园
- Platform to Humen Railway Station

General information
- Location: Qifeng Road and Dongguan Avenue Intersection, Dongguan, China; China
- Coordinates: 23.02282°N 113.76271°E
- Operator: Dongguan Rail Transit Corporation, Limited
- Line: Line 2
- Platforms: Island platform

Other information
- Station code: 207

History
- Opened: 27 May 2016
Location

Qifeng Park Station (Chinese: 旗峰公园站) is a metro station on Line 2 of the Dongguan Rail Transit in Dongguan, China. It opened on 27 May 2016.

== Station Platform ==
Ground level
Ground level	Entrance

(B1)	Hall	Vending machine, Customer service
(B2)		← Line 2 toward Dongguan railway station (Dongcheng)
(B2)	Island platform, doors will open on the left
(B2)		→ Line 2 toward Humen railway station (Civic Center) →

Preceding station	Dongguan Rail Transit	Following station
Civic Center towards Humen Railway Station	Line 2	Dongcheng towards Dongguan Railway Station
