= Integrated Surface Database =

Integrated Surface Database (ISD) is global database compiled by the National Oceanic and Atmospheric Administration (NOAA) and the National Centers for Environmental Information (NCEI) comprising hourly and synoptic surface observations compiled globally from ~35,500 weather stations; it is updated, automatically, hourly. The data largely date back to paper records which were keyed in by hand from '60s and '70s (and in some cases, weather observations from over one hundred years ago). It was developed by the joint Federal Climate Complex project in Asheville, North Carolina.
