= International School of Dongguan =

School in Guangdong, China

- 东莞文盛国际学校
- Dongguan, Guangdong; China

Information
- School type: International School
- Established: 2012; 14 years ago
- Grades: Pre-kindergarten - Grade 12
- Website: Official website

International School of Dongguan
- Traditional Chinese: 東莞文盛國際學校
- Simplified Chinese: 东莞文盛国际学校
Transcriptions
Standard Mandarin
- Hanyu Pinyin: Dōngguǎn Wénshèng Guójì Xuéxiào
Yue: Cantonese
- Jyutping: dung1 gun1 man4 sing6 gwok3 zai3 hok6 haau6

International School of Dongguan (ISD; Chinese: 东莞文盛国际学校) is an international school in Nancheng District, Dongguan, Guangdong, China. It serves levels pre-kindergarten through grade 12.

It is the first international school authorized by the Chinese Ministry of Education in Dongguan. ISD has been providing education since 2012.

ISD is accredited by the Western Association of Schools and Colleges (WASC), making it one of only 60 WASC-accredited international schools in all of China. Besides, ISD is an authorized IB World School offering IBDP to the students. ISD is a member of two regional professional organizations for international schools: Association of China and Mongolia International Schools (ACAMIS) and East Asia Regional Council of Overseas Schools (EARCOS).

== Accreditation, memberships, and associations ==
The International School of Dongguan is accredited, a member of, or associated with the following organizations:

- Western Association of Schools and Colleges (WASC)
- The International Baccalaureate Diploma Program (IBDP)
- National Council of Curriculum and Textbook Development (NCCT)
- East Asia Regional Council of Schools (EARCOS)
- Association of China and Mongolia International Schools (ACAMIS)
- International School Services (ISS)
