= Tianbao station (Dongguan Rail Transit) =

Metro station in Dongguan, China

Tianbao 天宝
- Platform to Humen Railway Station

General information
- Location: Wennan Road and Dongcheng Middle Road Intersection, Dongguan, Guangdong; China
- Coordinates: 23°2′57.44″N 113°46′24.85″E
- Operator: Dongguan Rail Transit Corporation, Limited
- Line: Line 2
- Platforms: Island platform

Other information
- Station code: 205

History
- Opened: 27 May 2016
Location

Tianbao Station (Chinese: 天宝站) is a metro station on Line 2 of the Dongguan Rail Transit in Dongguan, China. It opened on 27 May 2016.

== Station Platform ==
Ground level
Ground level	Entrance

(B1)	Hall	Vending machine, Customer service
(B2)		← Line 2 toward Dongguan railway station (Xiaqiao)
(B2)	Island platform, doors will open on the left
(B2)		→ Line 2 toward Humen railway station (Dongcheng) →

Preceding station	Dongguan Rail Transit	Following station
Dongcheng towards Humen Railway Station	Line 2	Xiaqiao towards Dongguan Railway Station
