= Civic Center station (Dongguan Rail Transit) =

Metro station in Dongguan, China

Civic Center 市民中心
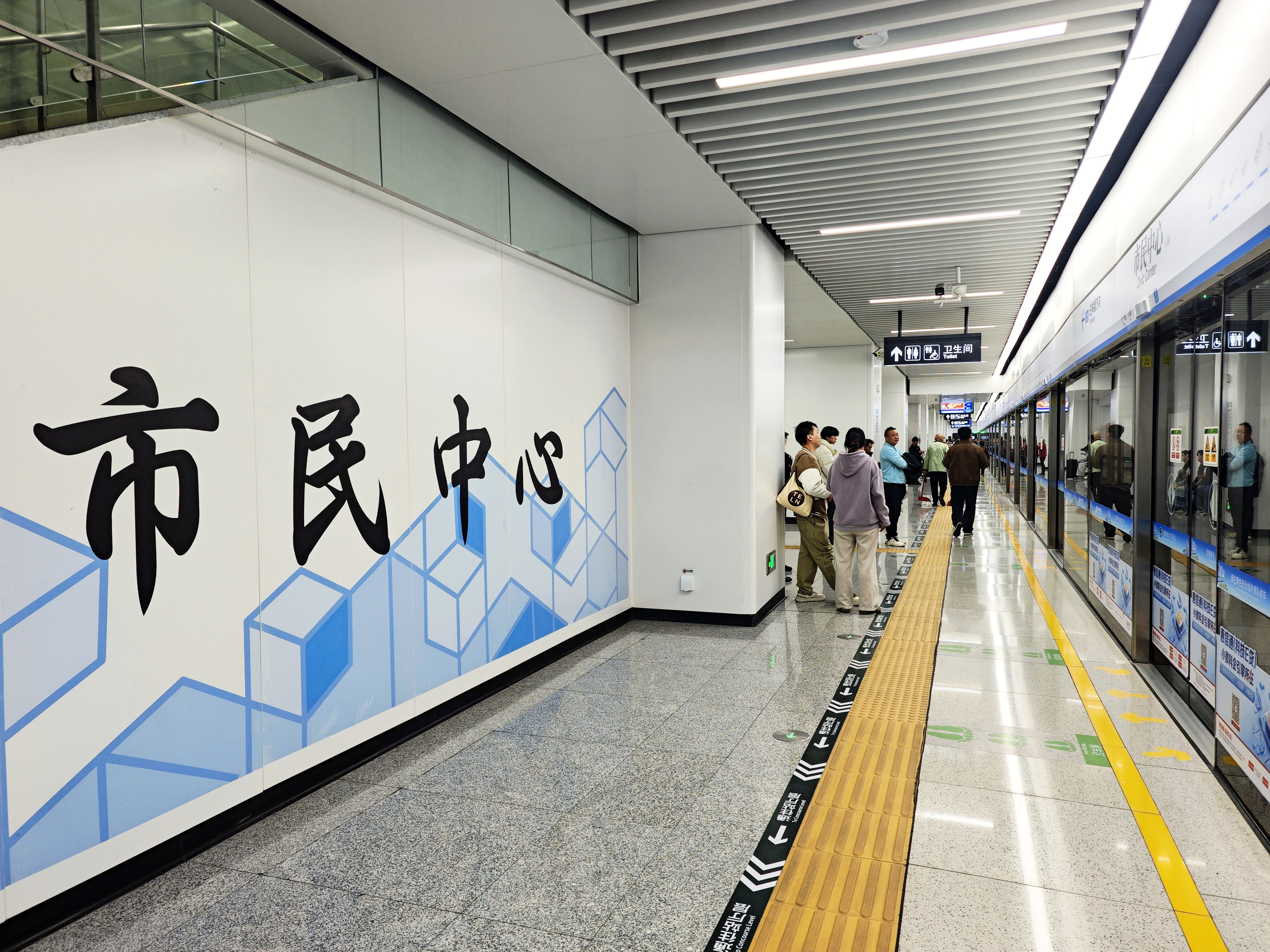
- Boarding Platform of Line 1 (towards Meitang)

General information
- Location: Hongfu Road and Dongguan Avenue Intersection, Dongguan, Guangdong; China
- Coordinates: 23°0′51.84″N 113°45′17.78″E
- Operated by: Dongguan Rail Transit Corporation, Limited
- Lines: Line 1 Line 2
- Platforms: 4 (an island platform)

Construction
- Structure type: Underground

Other information
- Station code: 109 208

History
- Opened: 27 May 2016 (Line 2); 28 November 2025 (Line 1)

Services
Preceding station	Dongguan Rail Transit	Following station
Central Square towards Dongguanxi Railway Station	Line 1	Lixin towards Meitang
Xiping towards Humen Railway Station	Line 2	Qifeng Park towards Dongguan Railway Station
Location

Civic Center Station (Chinese: 市民中心站) is an interchange station between Line 1 and Line 2 of the Dongguan Rail Transit in Dongguan, China. The Line 2 station opened on 27 May 2016, and the Line 1 station opened on 28 November 2025. The station was named Hongfu Road station (Chinese: 鸿福路) since opening on 27 May 2016 and renamed Civic Center station on 15 October 2025.

== Station Platform ==
Ground level		Entrance
(B1)	Hall	Vending machine, customer service
(B2)		← Line 2 towards Dongguan railway station (Qifeng Park)
(B2)	Island platform, doors will open on the left (Toilets, Nursery)
(B2)		Line 2 towards Humen railway station (Xiping) →
(B2)		Line 2 Equipment Area
Mezzanine	Transfer passage	Transfer passage between Line 2 and Line 1 Island Platform
(B3)	Side platform (toilet, mother and baby room), only for getting off
(B3)		← Line 1 towards Dongguanxi Railway Station (Central Square)
(B3)	Island platform (toilet), for on-cart only
(B3)		Line 1 towards Meitang (Lixin) →
	Side platform (toilet, mother and baby room), only for getting off
