= International School of Dakar =

Private school in Dakar, Senegal

- Dakar; Senegal

Information
- Established: 1983; 43 years ago
- Grades: Pre-K 3 - Grade 12
- Enrollment: 780 (2024)
- Website: https://www.isdakar.org/

The International School of Dakar (ISD) is a private school in Dakar, Senegal. ISD is based on an international school curriculum, with preschool through 12th grade. It is situated close to the Atlantic Ocean and includes three separate buildings, one each for elementary, middle and high school.

== History ==
The school was founded in 1983.

== Campus ==
ISD is situated on 8 acres (32,000 m^{2}) of land overlooking the Atlantic Ocean. The campus includes a library, three computer labs, two playgrounds, three basketball courts, three volleyball courts, a pool and a multi-purpose gymnasium, all of which are based around a soccer field and a 308 m (1,010 ft) track. There is an in-school restaurant called Delices de Kanaicha (used to be Shady Shack), that is next to the pool. The elementary part of the school was relocated to its current position, next to the gym, on November 26, 2007. Additionally, numerous elementary classrooms surround the track.

In August 2007, the school had an estimated 300 students. As of 2024, ISD has 780 students enrolled from 101 different countries. Specifically, 95 different countries for the student body and 70 different countries within faculty and staff. There around 90+ different languages spoken within the community.

Before the 2012–13 school year, the school added a building for the Upper School, which consists of both Middle and High School classes. The new building houses 33 classrooms, including 2 computer labs, a Visual and Performing Arts wing, a Maker Space, and an outdoor amphitheater.

As of December 2016, ISD is rebuilding the gym into a purpose-built PreK building that will house 7 elementary classes. It will have a new playground and a connection to the grade 1/2/3 classroom building.

== Curriculum ==
ISD follows a United States-based curriculum, and instruction is in English. French is offered for all grades, and there are four levels in which the students progress. As of 2024, Spanish is also an option for language acquisition. Middle school is partially integrated, with a daily community meeting time. Preschool is for three and four year-olds and is a half day program only.

ISD is accredited by the Middle States Association of Colleges and Schools and the Council of International Schools and it is an International Baccalaureate (IB) World School which offers the Diploma Programme, Middle Years Program, and Primary Years Program. The graduating class of 2015 was ISD's first IB cohort.
