= Daojiao railway station =

Intercity railway station in Dongguan, Guangdong, China

Daojiao 道滘
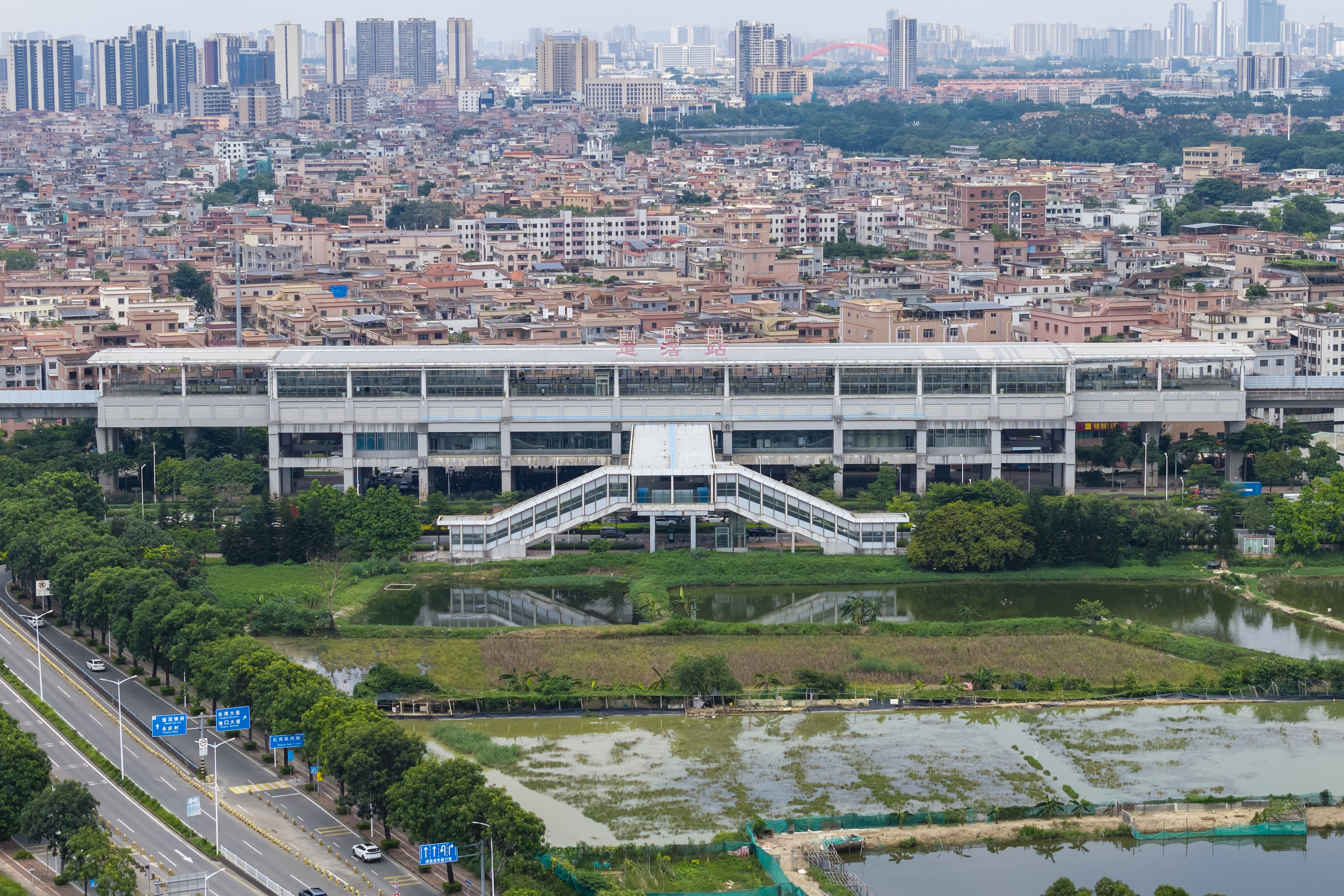
- Exterior

Chinese name
- Chinese: 道滘站
Transcriptions
Standard Mandarin
- Hanyu Pinyin: Dàojiào Zhàn
Yue: Cantonese
- Yale Romanization: Douhgaau Jaahm
- Jyutping: Dou^{6}gaau^{3} Zaam^{6}

General information
- Location: Intersection of Shuixiang Boulevard (水乡大道) and Hongnan Road (虹南路), Daojiao, Dongguan, Guangdong; China
- Coordinates: 22°59′36.96″N 113°39′13.99″E
- Owner: Pearl River Delta Metropolitan Region intercity railway
- Operator: Guangdong Intercity
- Line: Guangzhou–Huizhou intercity railway
- Platforms: 2 (2 side platforms)
- Tracks: 2

Construction
- Structure type: Elevated
- Accessible: Yes

Other information
- Station code: RRQ (Pinyin: DJI)

History
- Opened: 28 December 2017 (8 years ago)

Services
Preceding station	Pearl River Delta Metropolitan Region Intercity Railway	Following station
Dongguan West towards Panyu	Guangzhou–Huizhou intercity railway	Xiping West towards Huizhou North
Location

Daojiao railway station (Chinese: 道滘站; pinyin: Dàojiào Zhàn; Cantonese Yale: Douhgaau Jaahm) is a railway station in Daojiao, Dongguan, Guangdong, China. It opened on 28 December 2017, and was the western terminus of the Guangzhou–Huizhou intercity railway before Dongguan West opened on 15 December 2019.

== Entrances/exits ==
The station has 4 points of entry/exit, currently only Exits A and D are open. Both exits are accessible via elevators.

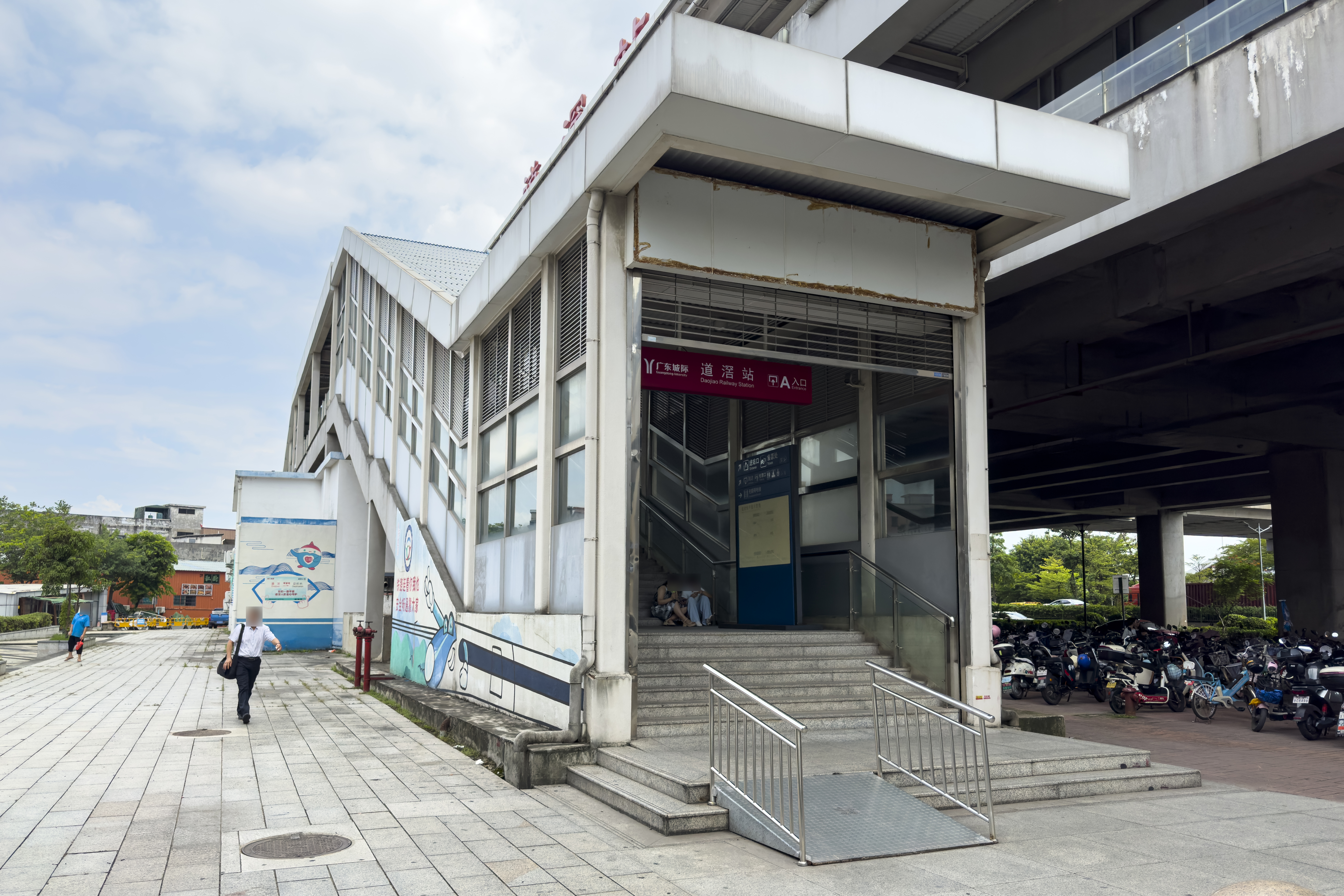
Entrance A

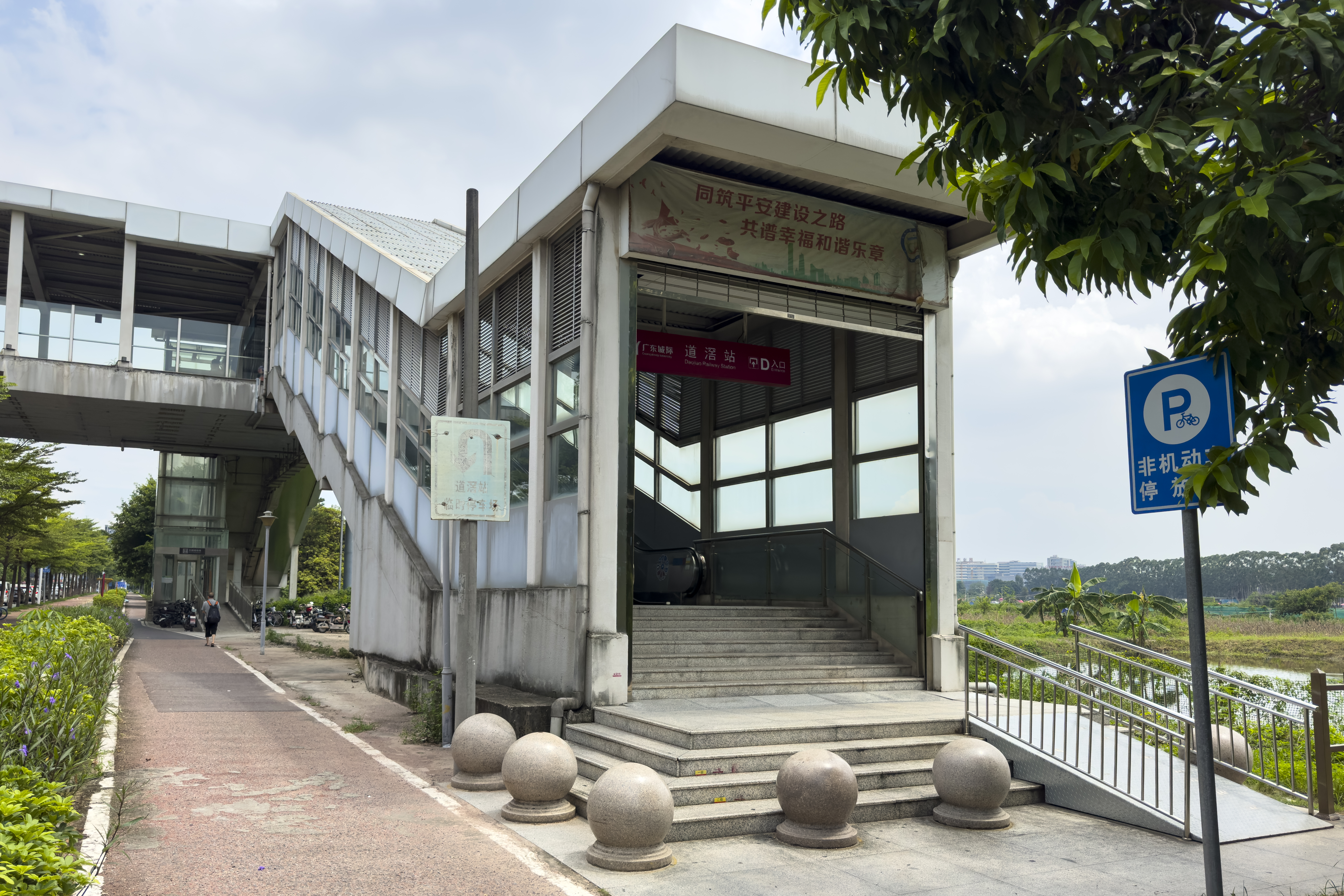
Entrance D

== History ==
In the early stage of Dongguan-Huizhou intercity planning, the station was planned to be located about 300m southeast of the current site. In 2010, after the Ministry of Railways intervened in the construction of the Pearl River Delta Metropolitan Region intercity railway, the line scheme was redesigned. In the end, due to the change of the interchange plan between the line and the Guangzhou–Shenzhen intercity railway and the need for the Dongguan urban section to go underground, the station position of this station was fine-tuned to the current location.

The station was operated by China Railway Guangzhou Group when it was opened, and was transferred to Guangdong Intercity on 23 January 2024.

== Gallery ==
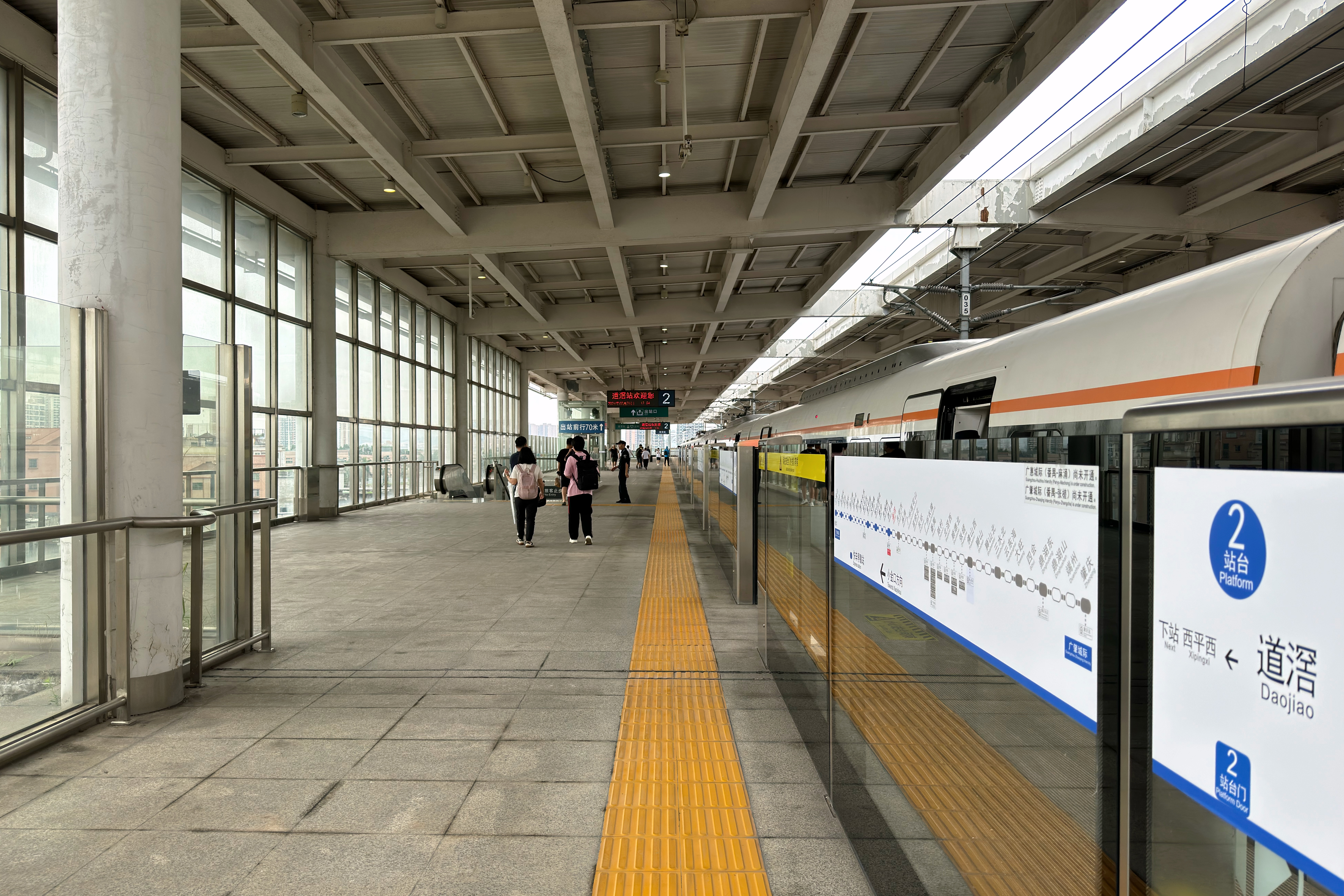
Platform 2

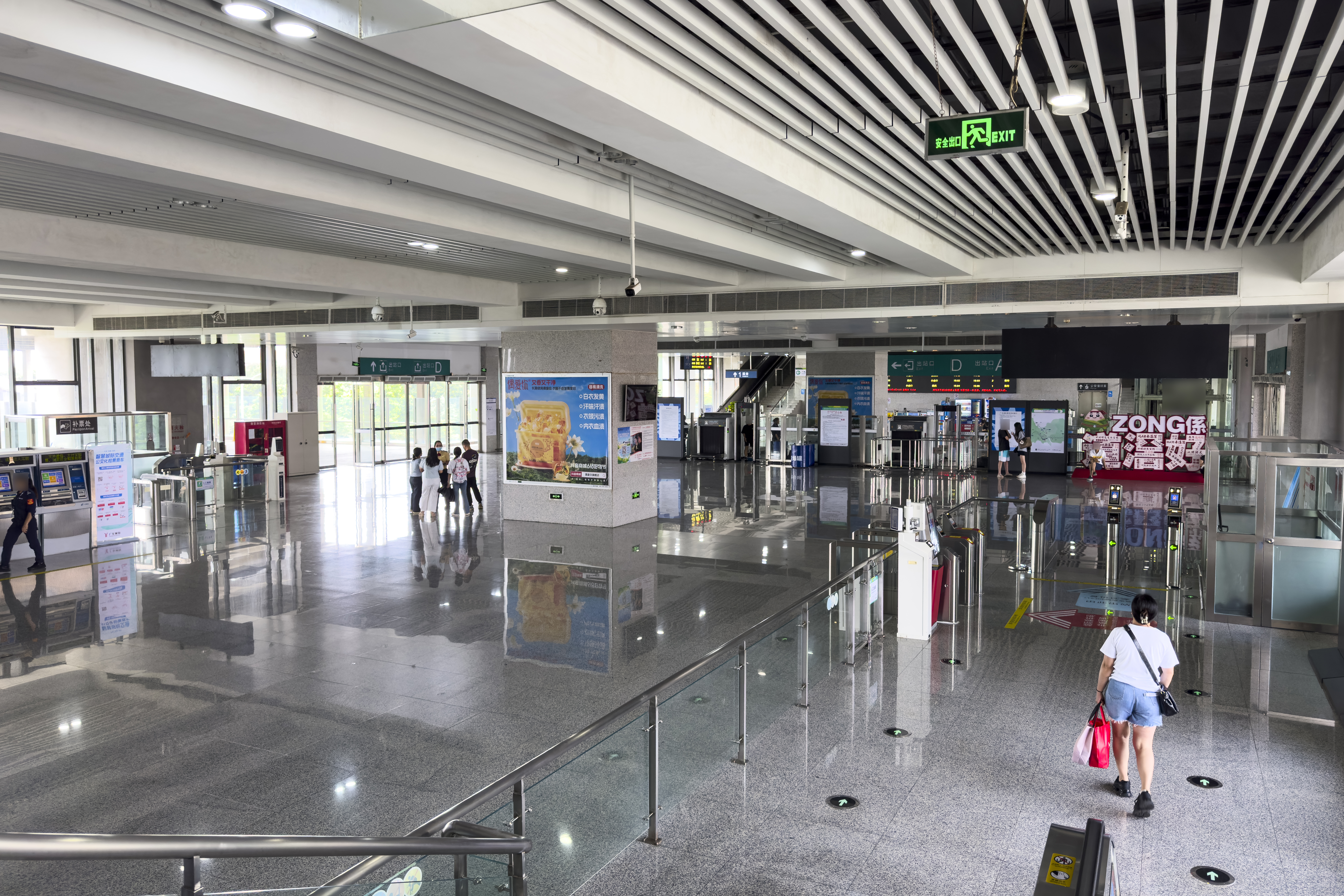
Concourse
