= Nancheng Subdistrict, Dongguan =

Coordinates: 23.02134°N 113.73811°E

Nancheng 南城街道
- Subdistrict
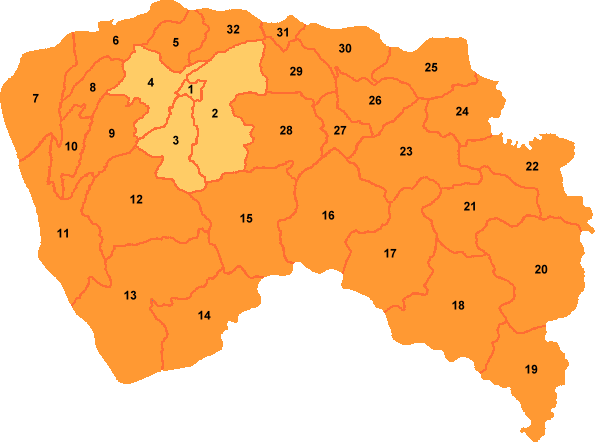
- Nancheng Subdistrict is labelled "3" on this map of Dongguan
- Country: People's Republic of China
- Province: Guangdong
- Prefecture-level city: Dongguan
- Time zone: UTC+8 (China Standard)

Nancheng Subdistrict, Dongguan
- Simplified Chinese: 南城街道
Transcriptions
Standard Mandarin
- Hanyu Pinyin: Nánchéng Jiēdào
Yue: Cantonese
- Jyutping: naam^{4}sing^{4} gaai^{1}dou^{6}

Nancheng Subdistrict is a subdistrict of Guangdong Province, China. It is under the administration of Dongguan city.

== Transportation ==
There is a bus service from Nancheng Subdistrict to Shenzhen Bao'an International Airport in Shenzhen.

== Education ==
The International School of Dongguan is located in Nancheng District.

== Economy ==
Several prominent international enterprises, including Walmart, Nokia, Nestle, have established operations in Nancheng. Among them, 12 feature in the list of the world's largest 500 enterprises.

=== Domestic Enterprises ===
Nancheng is also home to 13 national high-tech enterprises like Dongguan Anwell Digital Machinery Co., Ltd., Dongguan Land Dragon Paper Industries Co., Ltd., and Dongguan Shengyi Copper Clad laminate Co., Ltd. Additionally, there is a provincial-level innovative pilot enterprise and 26 provincial high-tech enterprises located in Nancheng, emphasizing its significance as a hub for global enterprise operations.
