= Lion Ocean Link =

Chinese fixed link

Lion Ocean Link 张靖皋长江大桥
- Shiziyang Channel
- Crosses: Shiziyang
- Locale: Guangzhou to Dongguan
- Official name: Lion Ocean Link

Characteristics
- Design: Fixed Link
- Total length: 35,089 m (115,121 ft)
- Longest span: 2,180 m (7,152 ft)

History
- Constructed by: China Communications Construction Company (CCCC)
- Fabrication by: China
- Construction start: August 2023
- Construction end: 2028 (prevision)

The Lion Ocean Link (Chinese: 獅子洋通道) is a river crossing under construction in Guangdong Province, connecting Guangzhou's Nansha District and Dongguan's Binhaiwan New Area.

== Locale ==
From Nansha, Guangzhou and Guangzhou to Humen Town and Dongguan.

== Construction ==
- In August 2023, the construction of the main tower pile foundation and anchorage diaphragm wall of Shiziyang Bridge was completed.
- In February 2024, the bottom sealing construction of the foundation pit of the east anchorage of Shiziyang Bridge was completed.
- On July 8, 2024, the bottom sealing construction of the west anchorage pit of Shiziyang Bridge was completed.
- In October 2024, the first prefabricated box girder of the Shiziyang Tunnel was successfully erected, marking the official start of the construction phase of the approach bridge superstructure.
- In December 2024, the core filling construction of the east anchorage of Shiziyang Bridge was successfully completed.
- In March 2025, the first steel beam of the Shiziyang Bridge was erected.
- On July 29, 2025, the connection section between the Shiziyang Channel and the Guangzhongjiang Expressway was officially started.

== See also ==
- List of longest suspension bridge spans - Under construction
- List of bridges in China
- Shiziyang Tunnel
- Humen Pearl River Bridge
