= Shiziyang Bridge =

Chinese suspended bridge

Shiziyang Bridge 张獅子洋橋
- Shiziyang Bridge Longitudinal Section
- Coordinates: 22.854198°N 113.565212°E
- Crosses: Pearl River
- Locale: Nansha District and Humen Town

Characteristics
- Design: Two levels suspension bridge
- Total length: 3,562 m (11,686 ft)
- Height: 340.2 m (1,116 ft)
- Longest span: 2,180 m (7,152 ft)
- No. of spans: 3
- No. of lanes: 2x8

History
- Constructed by: China Communications Construction Company (CCCC)
- Construction start: 2023
- Construction end: 2028 (prevision)

Location
- Interactive map of Shiziyang Bridge

The Shiziyang Bridge (Chinese: 獅子洋橋) is an under construction suspension bridge over the Pearl River in Humen Town, China.

== Locale ==
The bridge spans the Pearl River and is located between the cities of Nansha District and Humen Town.

== Description ==
The bridge will break five world records when completed.

1. Main span length = 2,180 m.
2. Tower height = 340.2 m.
3. Foundation diameter 130 m.
4. Cable thickness 150 cm.
5. Number of lanes 16, 8 per level.

A previous design included A-shaped towers with a height of 367 meters.

== See also ==
- List of longest suspension bridge spans - Under construction
- List of tallest bridges
- List of bridges in China
- Lion Ocean Link
- Shiziyang Tunnel
- Humen Pearl River Bridge
- Messina Bridge
