= Weiyuan Fort =

Chinese coastal defense fort in Dongguan

Coordinates: 22.7983°N 113.6207°E

- Simplified Chinese: 威远炮台
- Traditional Chinese: 威遠砲台
Transcriptions
Standard Mandarin
- Hanyu Pinyin: Wēiyuǎn Pàotái

Humen Fort
- Simplified Chinese: 虎门炮台
- Traditional Chinese: 虎門炮台
Transcriptions
Standard Mandarin
- Hanyu Pinyin: Hǔmén Pàotái

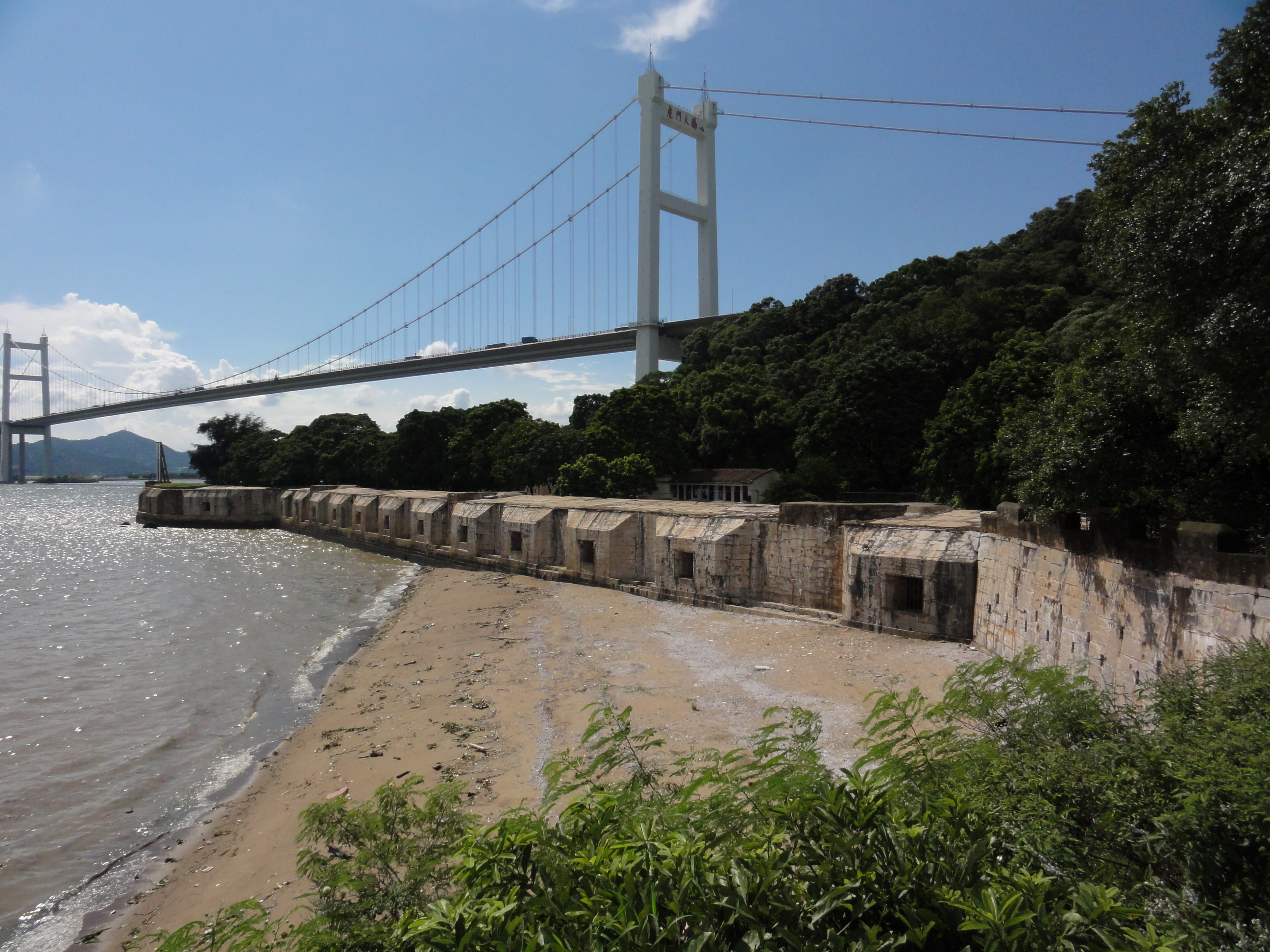
Weiyuan Fort in 2010

Weiyuan Fort (Chinese: 威远炮台) is a coastal-defense fort, now in ruins, in Humen, Dongguan city, Guangdong province, China. The fort was constructed in 1835 and was in use during the Opium Wars. The fort is situated immediately under the Humen Bridge. There were 44 cannons there to defend against the British, 40 dark artillery and four open fort. It is 360 meters in length. Admission is free, with valid documents.

== History ==
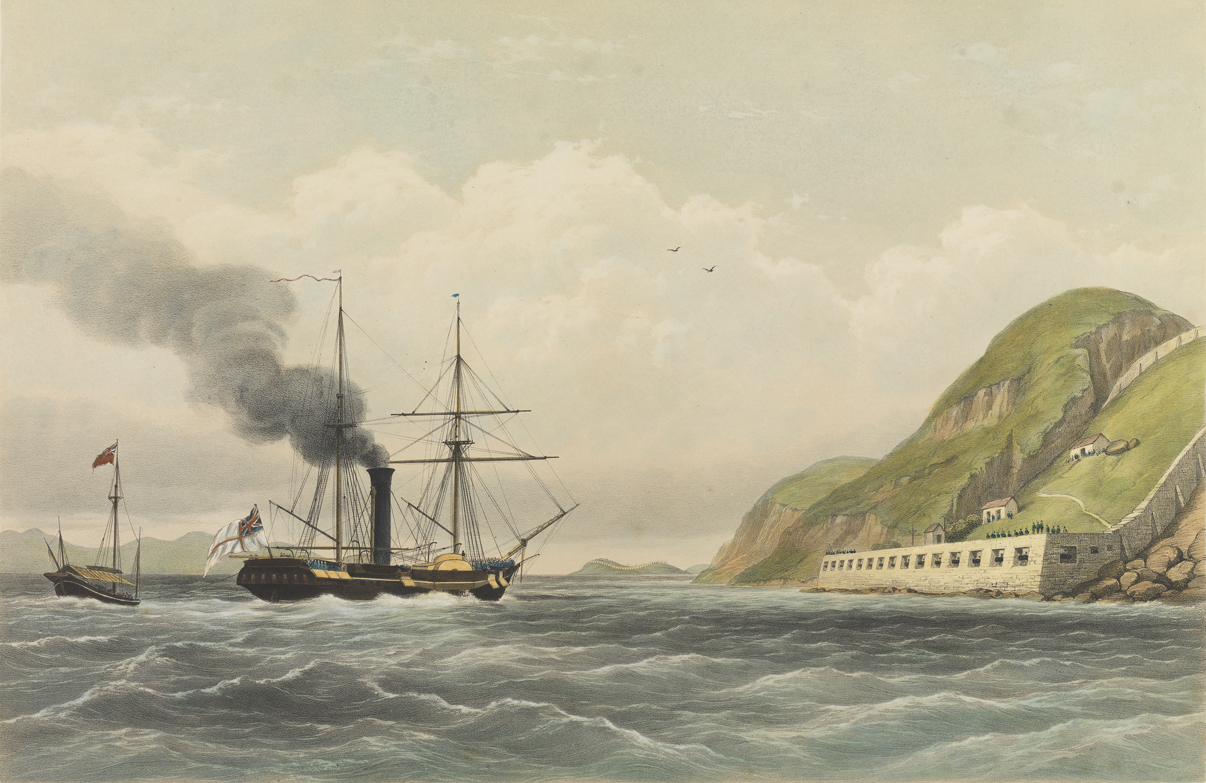
HMS Vulture passing the fort after the Expedition to Canton in 1847

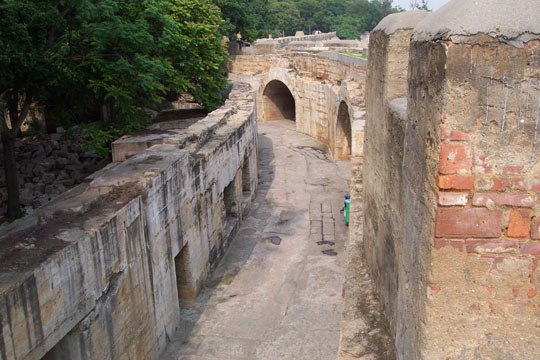
Inside view, 2006

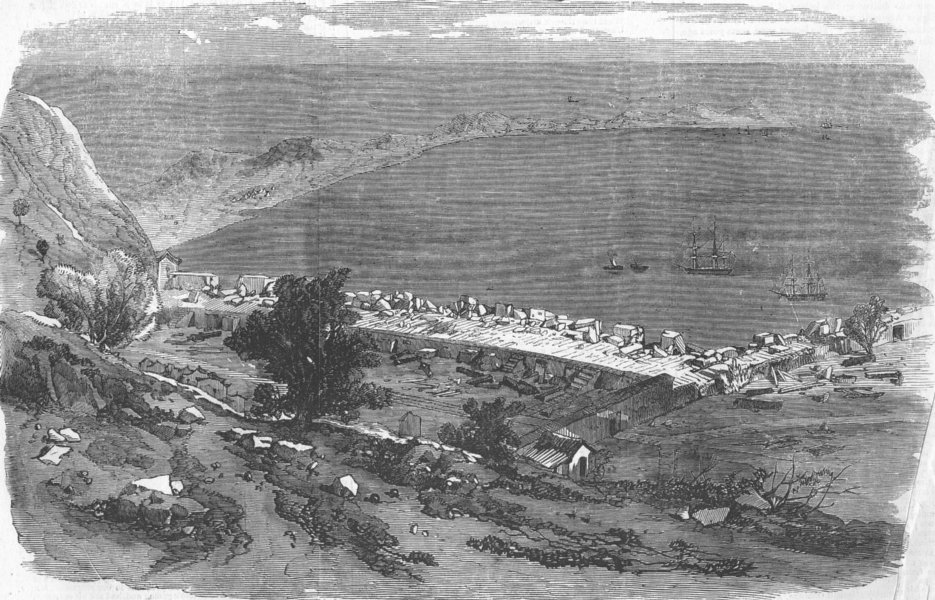
Interior of the fort in The Illustrated London News, 21 February 1857

Plans for Weiyuan Fort was drawn up in 1834 as part of efforts by the Qing government to fortify the defense of Humen strait in the Pearl River Delta. After the construction of four major forts along the straits, Lu Kun suggested that another fort be constructed in the style of a crossed platform (横档月台), which was Weiyuan Fort. At the same time, Yong'an Fort (永安炮台) was built on the western end of an island in the strait and Gonggu Fort (巩固炮台) was constructed on the opposite bank in the foothills of Luwan Mountain (芦湾山). Weiyuan Fort was captured in the 1841 Battle of the Bogue, 1847 Expedition to Canton, and 1856 Battle of the Bogue.

During Sun Yat-sen's Constitutional Protection Military Government of Guangzhou, Gong Zhenzhou served as the commander-in-chief of the Humen Fortress.

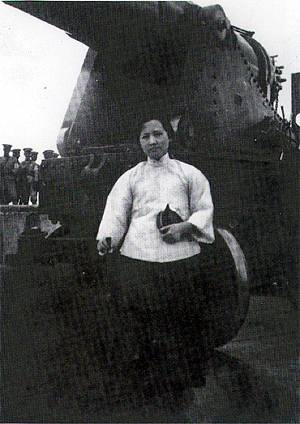
Madame Sun Yat-sen at Weiyuan Fort
