= Lianhua Pagoda =

Coordinates: 22°59′35″N 113°29′52″E

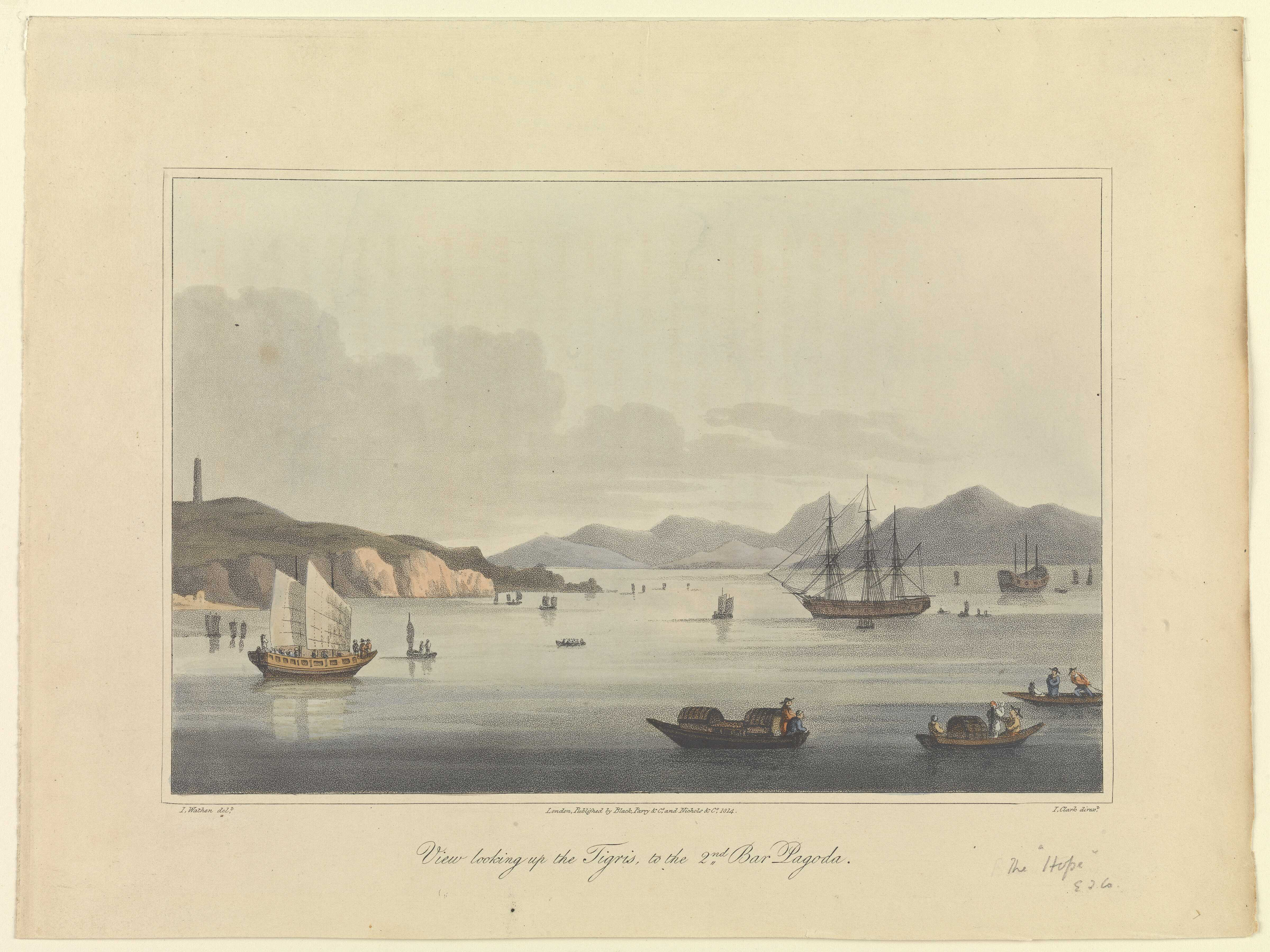
An example of a European print featuring the pagoda. View Looking up the Tigris to the 2nd Bar Pagoda, print, 215 mm x 288 mm published by Black, Parry & Co; Clark, I. Nichols & Co Wathen, James, 1814, National Maritime Museum, Greenwich.

The Lianhua Pagoda, also known as the Lotus Pagoda, is a pagoda on the shore of the Pearl River in Guangdong, China. Built during the reign of Wanli (1572–1620), it is notable as its role as a landmark for European merchants travelling to Canton (Guangzhou). Because it is visible from the Bocca Tigris, the narrow point of the Pearl River where customs checks took place, it was a frequent sight for sailors. European merchants also knew it as the "Second Bar Pagoda", and it is featured in a variety of Canton export paintings and European prints. The Lianhua Pagoda also served to inspire Chinoiserie models and replicas of pagodas in Europe. Originally situated within a quarry, today it has been restored and its surroundings turned into a park.

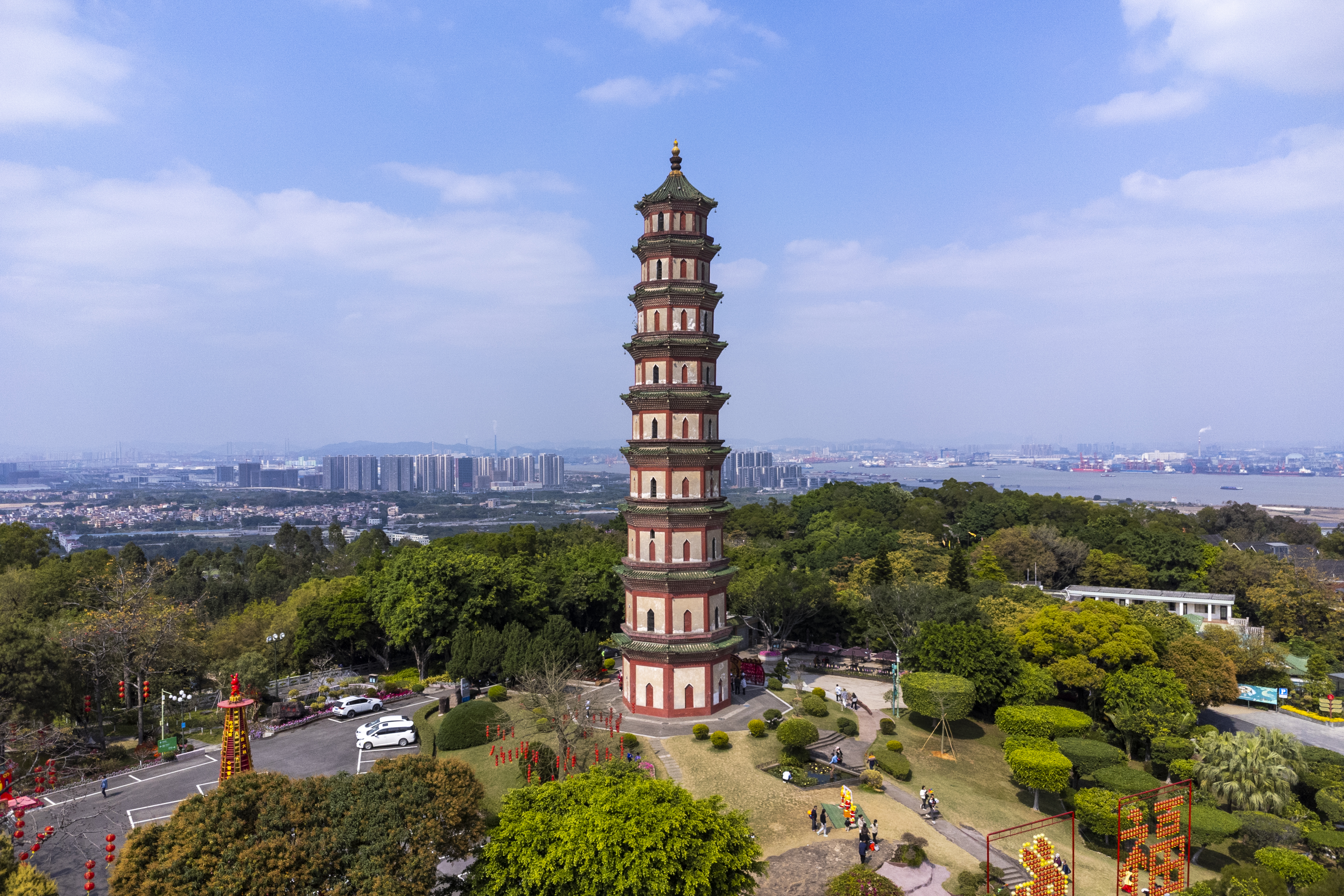
The Lianhua Pagoda today
