= Houjie railway station =

Railway station in Dongguan, Guangdong, China

Houjie 厚街
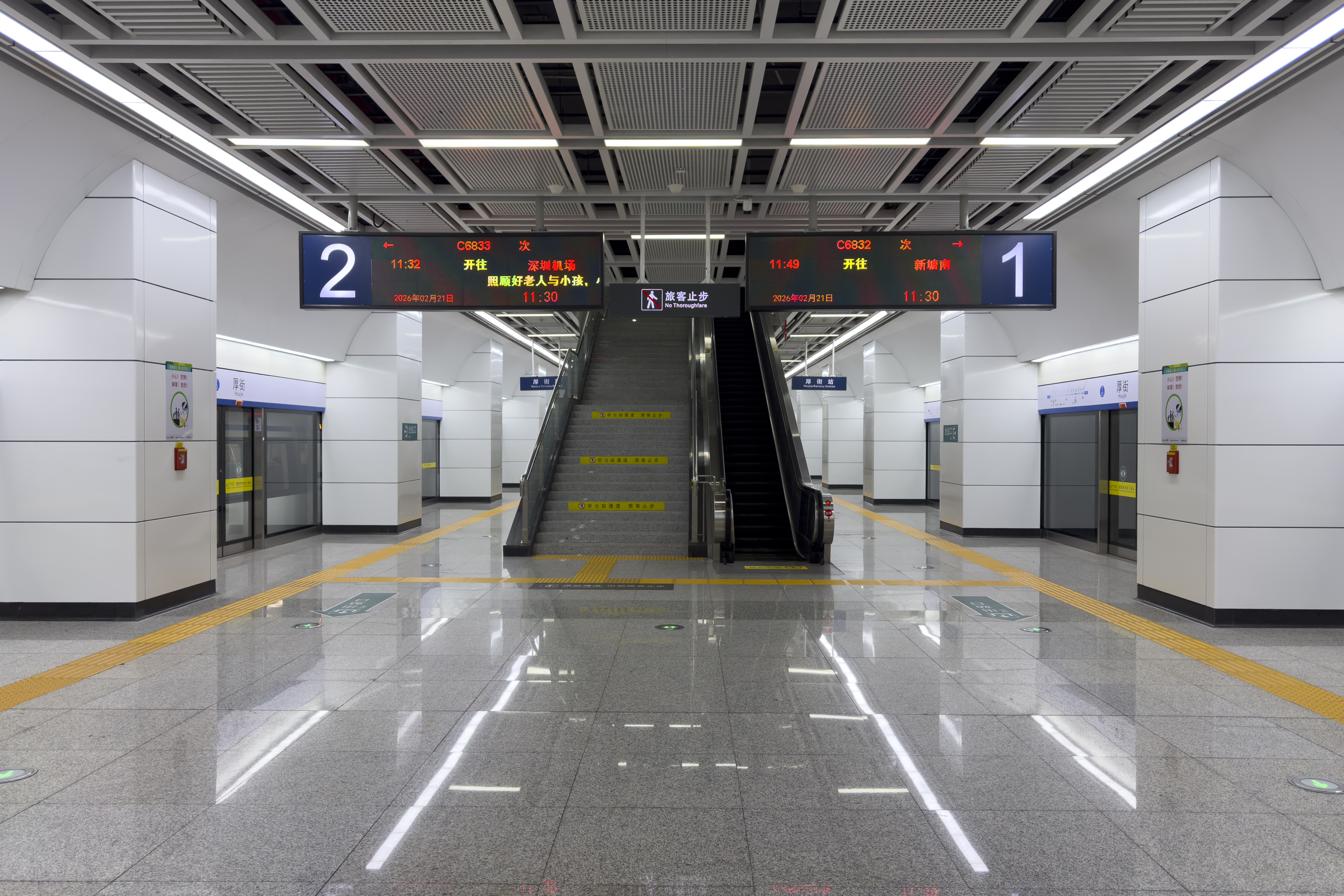
- Platform

Chinese name
- Chinese: 厚街站
Transcriptions
Standard Mandarin
- Hanyu Pinyin: Hòujiē Zhàn
Yue: Cantonese
- Yale Romanization: Hauhgāai Jaahm
- Jyutping: Hau^{5}gaai^{1} Zaam^{6}

General information
- Location: Dongxi Road, Xitou Village, Houjie, Dongguan, Guangdong; China
- Coordinates: 22°53′50″N 113°38′50″E
- Owner: Pearl River Delta Metropolitan Region intercity railway
- Operator: Guangdong Intercity
- Line: Guangzhou–Shenzhen intercity railway
- Platforms: 2 (1 island platform)
- Tracks: 4

Construction
- Structure type: Underground
- Accessible: Yes

Other information
- Station code: HJA (Pinyin: HJI)

History
- Opened: 15 December 2019 (6 years ago)

Services
| Preceding station | Pearl River Delta Metropolitan Region Intercity Railway | Following station |
|---|---|---|
| Dongguangang towards Zhuliao | Guangzhou–Shenzhen intercity railway | Humen North towards Shenzhen Airport |
Location

Houjie railway station (Chinese: 厚街站; pinyin: Hòujiē Zhàn; Cantonese Yale: Hauhgāai Jaahm) is an underground railway station in Houjie, Dongguan, Guangdong, China. It opened on 15 December 2019. The station has 4 exits, lettered A-D.

== Gallery ==
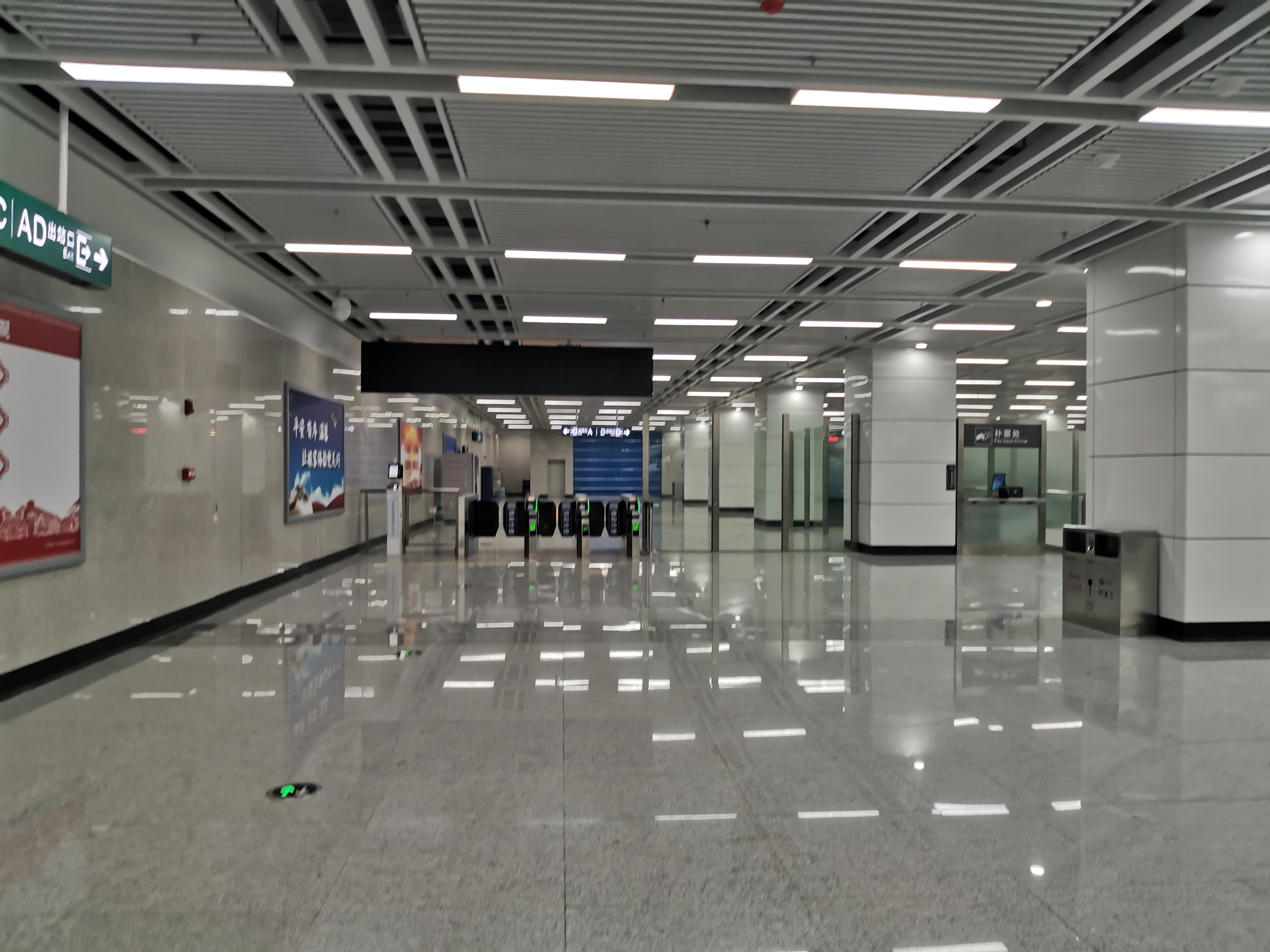
Exit gates

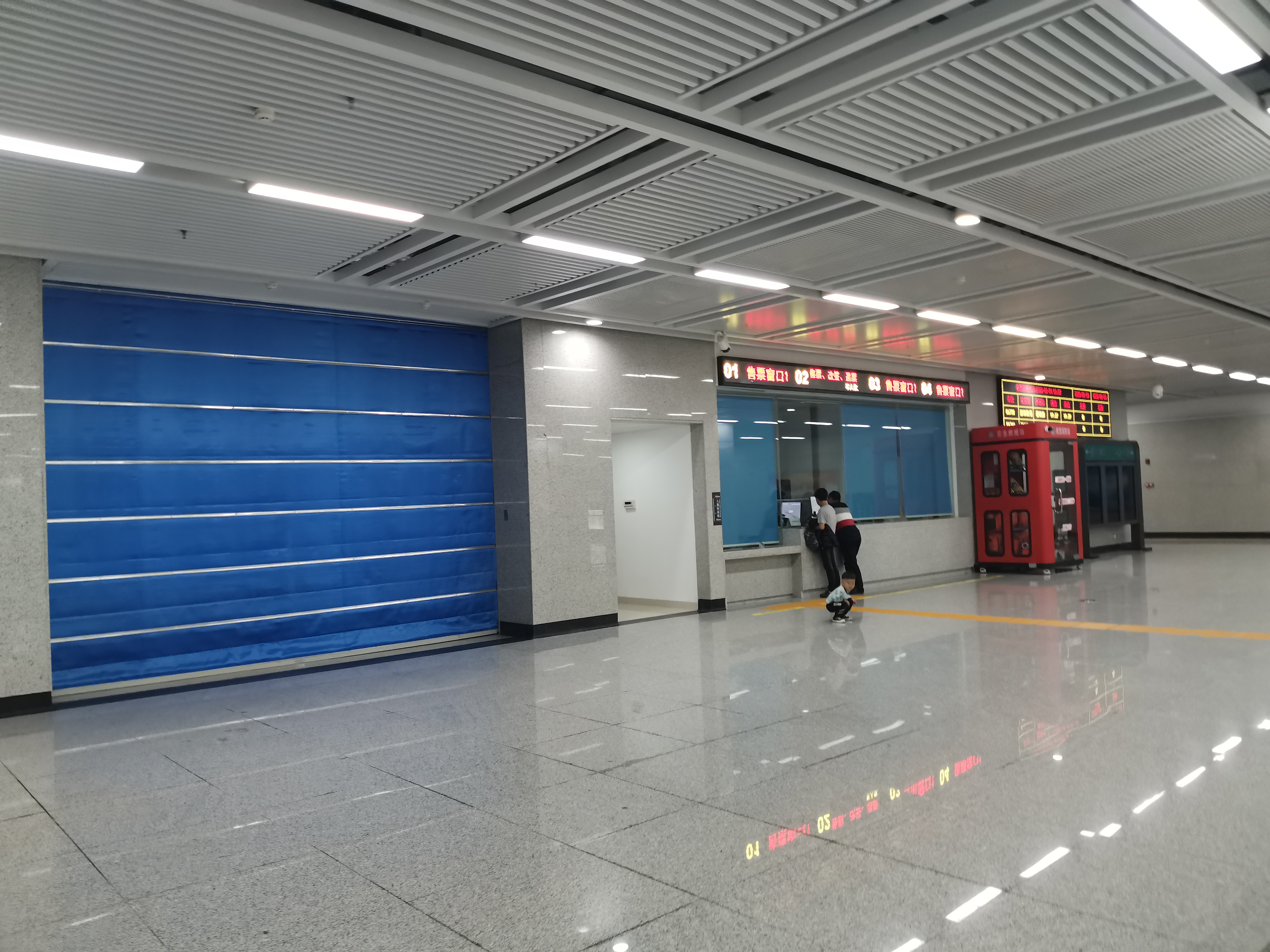
Ticket booth

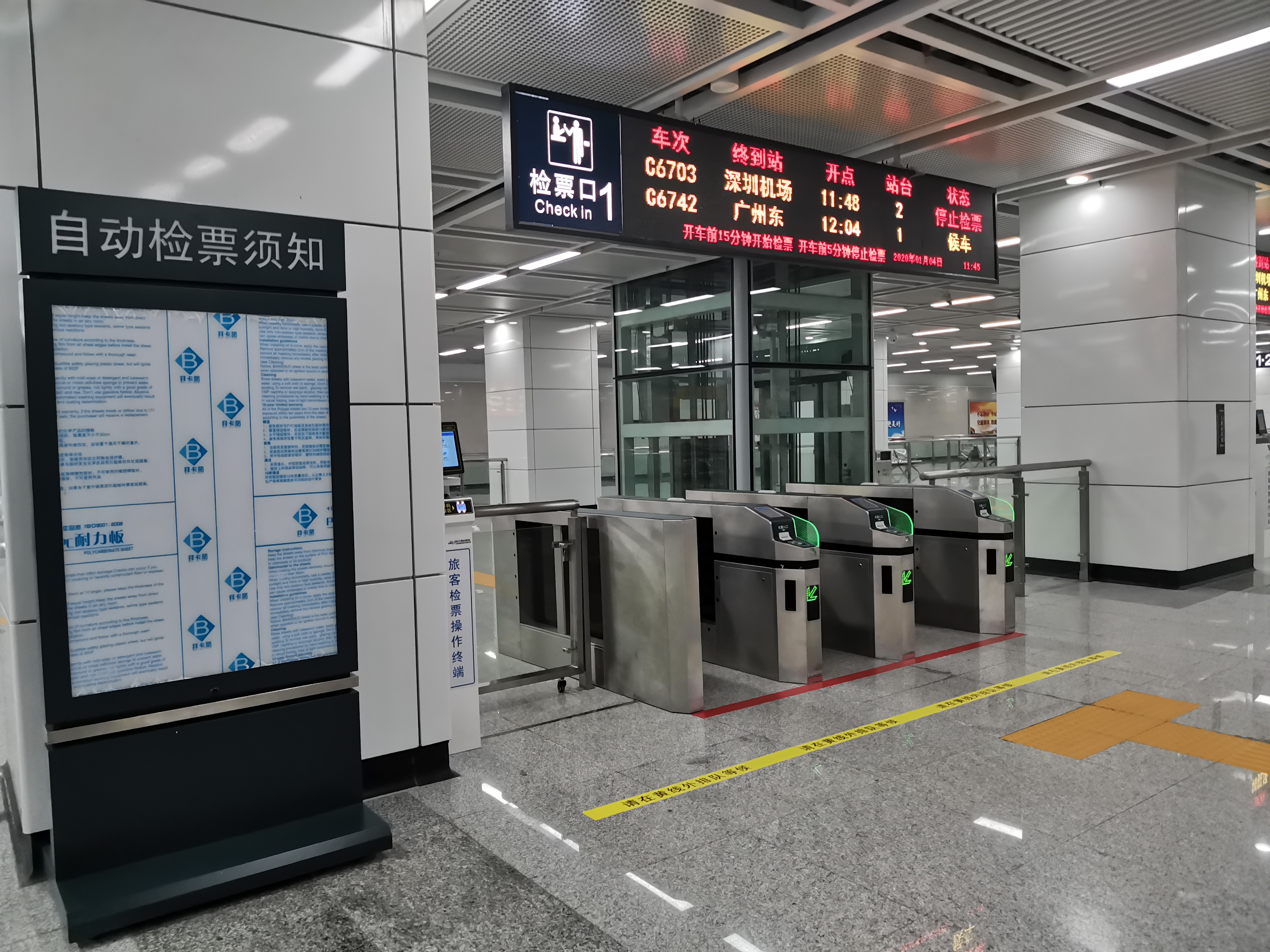
Ticket gates

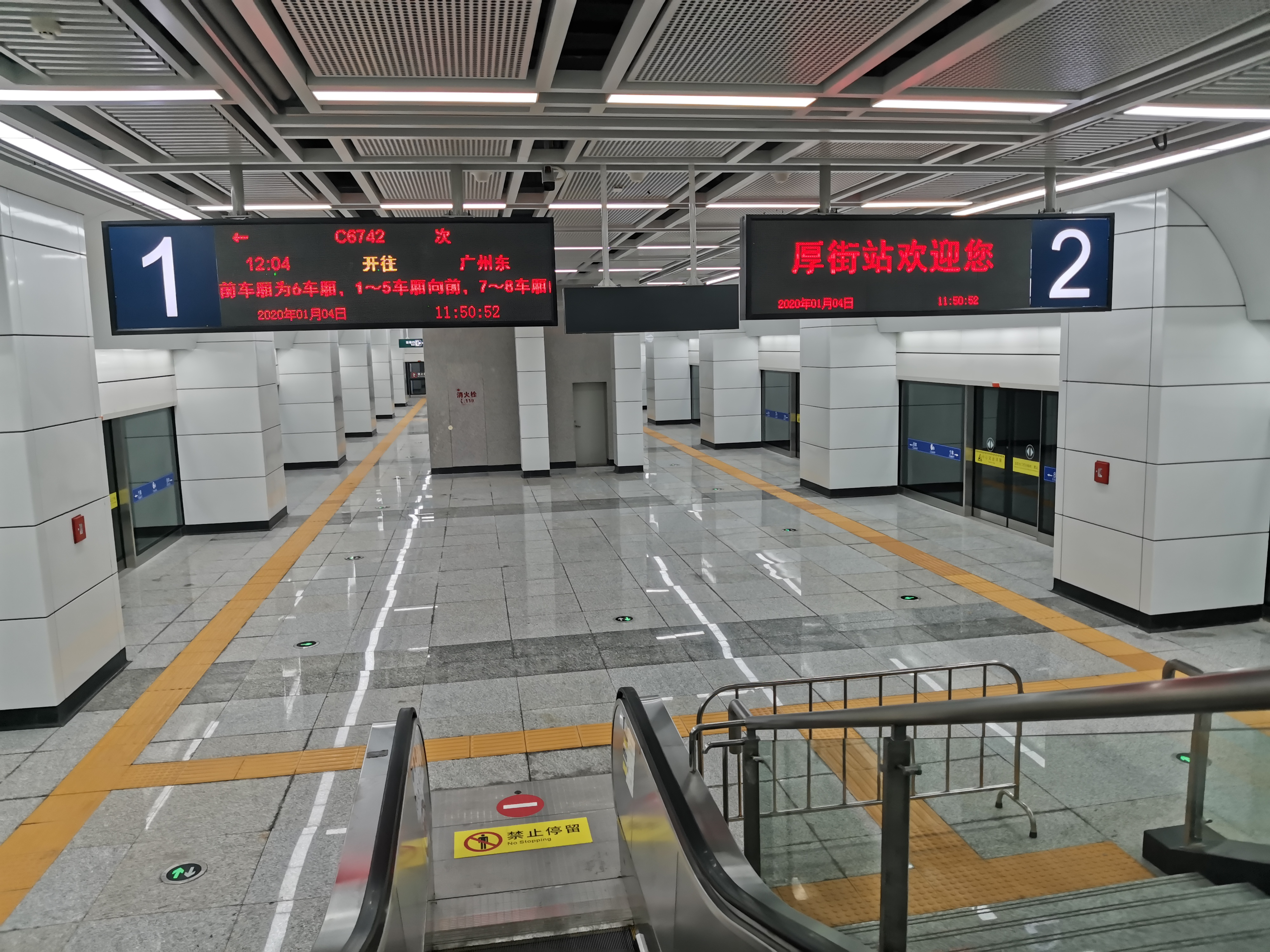
Platform and signage

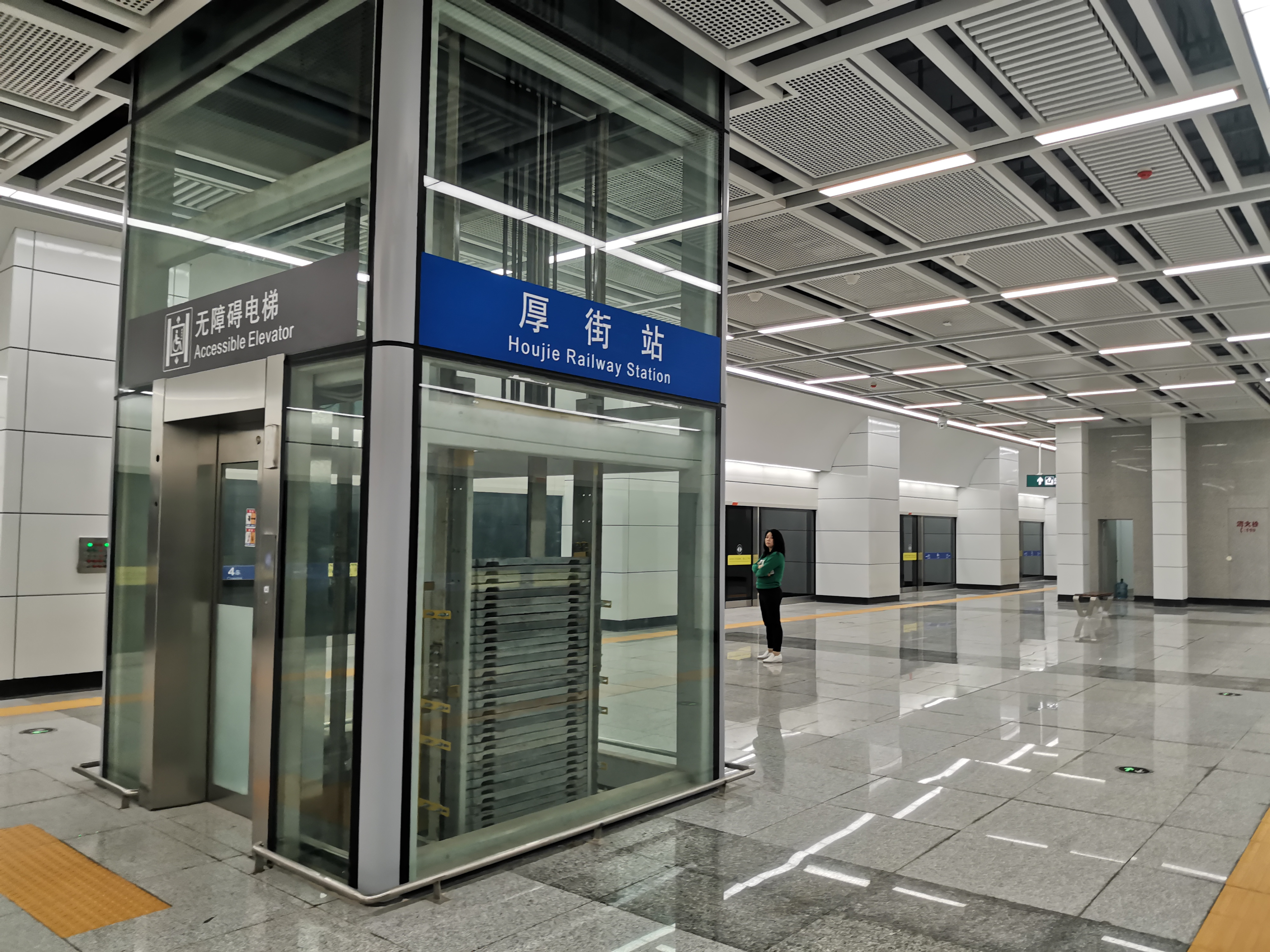
Platform station sign and elevator

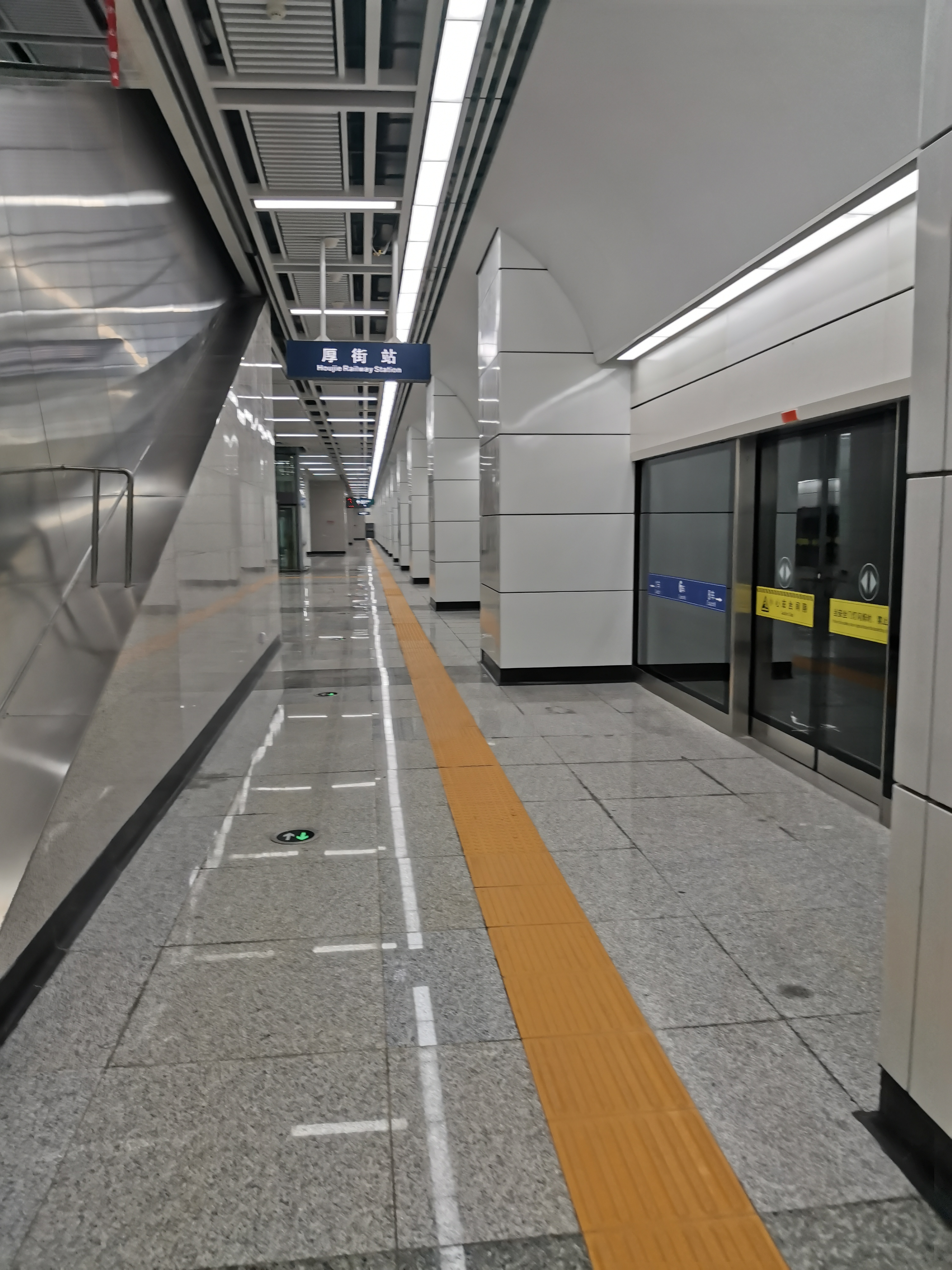
Platform

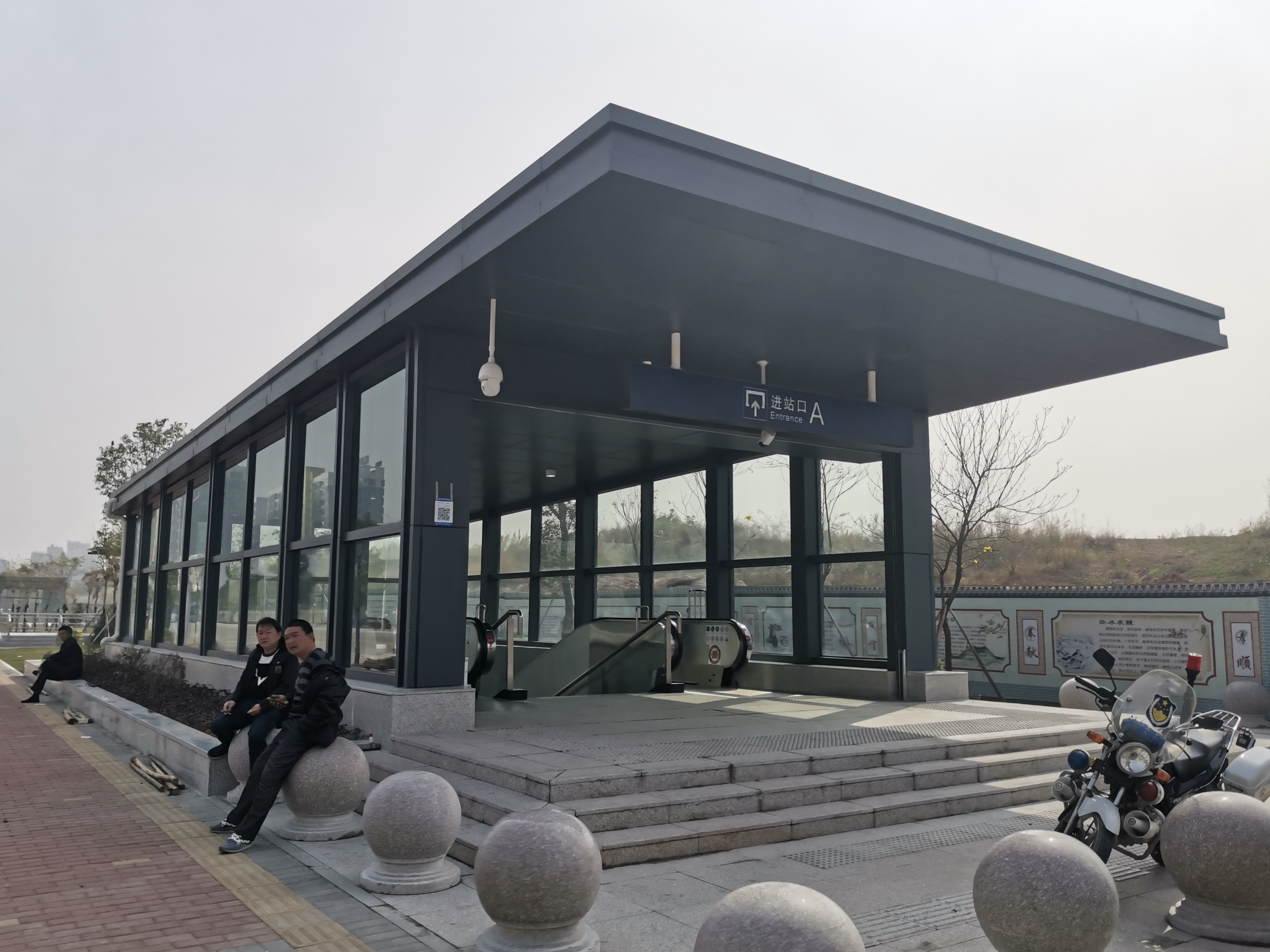
Exit A
