= Shiziyang =

Upper channel of the Pearl River estuary in China

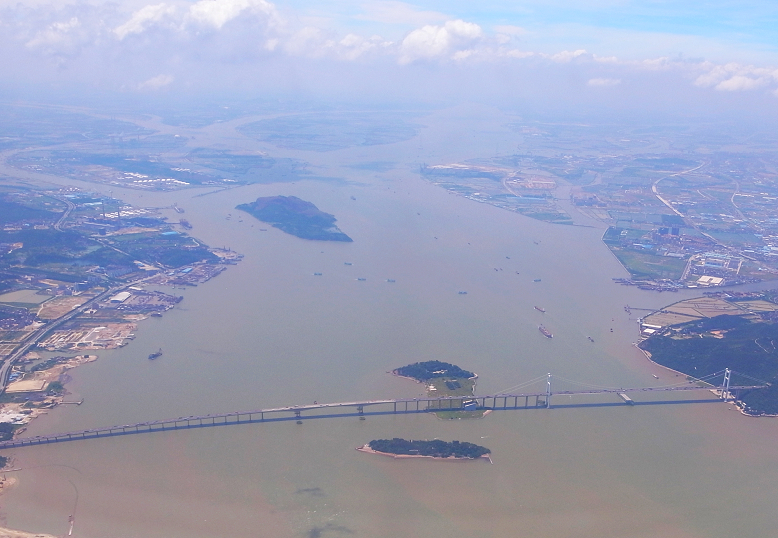
- Humen Pearl River Bridge in the front facing Shiziyang in the back.
- Traditional Chinese: 獅子洋
- Simplified Chinese: 狮子洋
- Literal meaning: lion ocean
Transcriptions
Standard Mandarin
- Hanyu Pinyin: Shīziyáng
Yue: Cantonese
- Yale Romanization: Sījí Yèuhng
- Jyutping: si1 zi2 joeng4

Shiziyang (Chinese: 狮子洋) or Shizi Channel is the upper channel of the Pearl River estuary.

== Description ==
It runs from the confluence of the Dong River and the Pearl River with parts of the Bei River to the Bocca Tigris which separate Lingdingyang the mid channel of the Pearl River Estuary in the south. It is a wide tidal strait connecting the Huangpu New Port of Guangzhou to the South China Sea.The Huangpu New Port is located at the confluence of the Dong River and the Pearl River. The Huangpu New Port is only part of the larger Port of Guangzhou. Currently there is one rail tunnel (Shiziyang Tunnel) and one bridge (Humen Pearl River Bridge) crossing the Shiziyang.

== See also ==
- Shiziyang Tunnel
- Shiziyang Link
