= Humen North railway station =

Railway station in Dongguan, Guangdong

Humenbei 虎门北
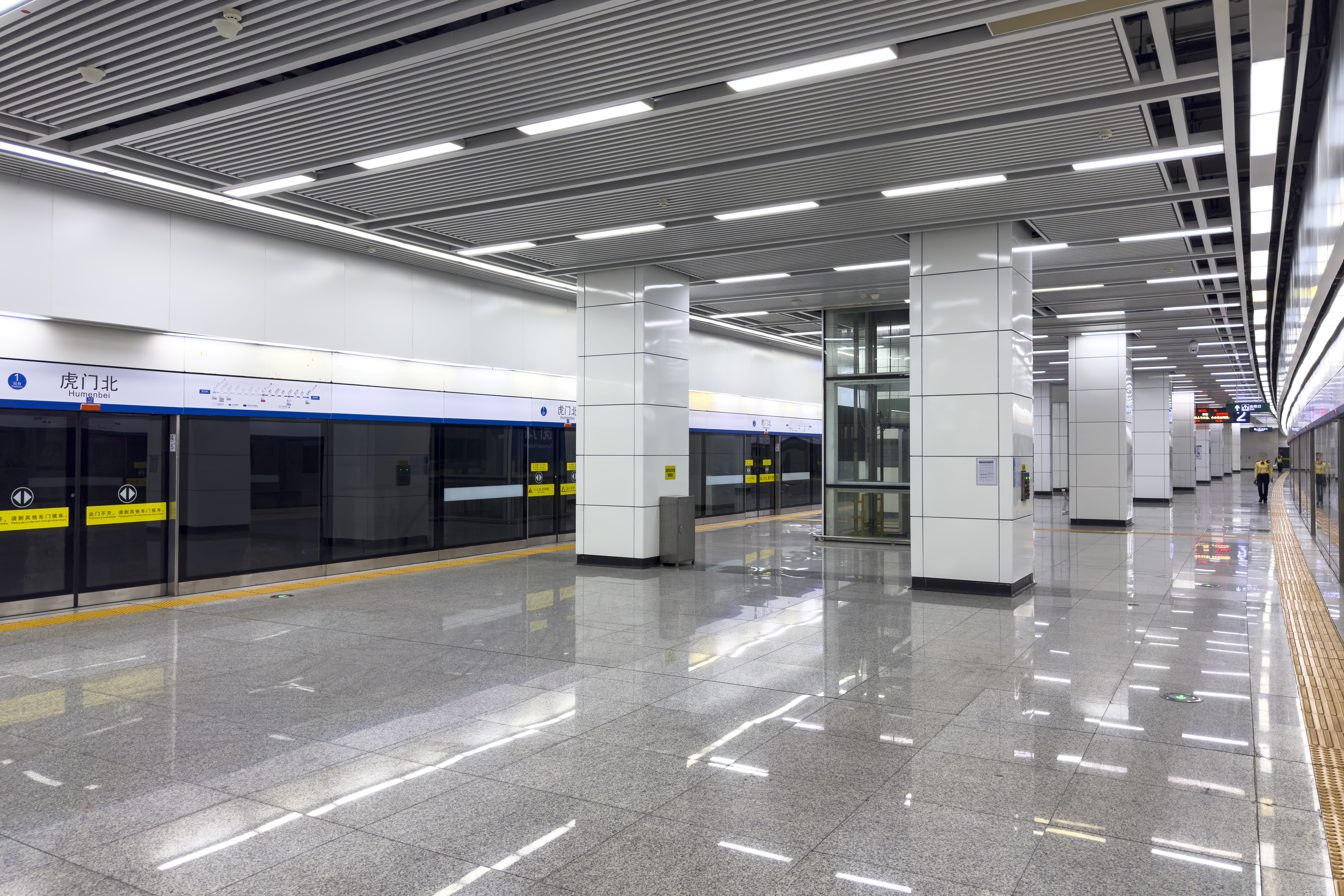
- Platform

Chinese name
- Simplified Chinese: 虎门北站
- Traditional Chinese: 虎門北站
Transcriptions
Standard Mandarin
- Hanyu Pinyin: Hǔmén Běi Zhàn
Yue: Cantonese
- Yale Romanization: Fúmùhn Bāk Jaahm
- Jyutping: Fu^{2}mun^{4} Bak^{1} Zaam^{6}

General information
- Location: Humen, Dongguan, Guangdong; China
- Coordinates: 22°51′43″N 113°39′59″E
- Owner: Pearl River Delta Metropolitan Region intercity railway
- Operator: Guangdong Intercity
- Line: Guangzhou–Shenzhen intercity railway
- Platforms: 2 (1 island platform)
- Tracks: 2
- Connections: 2 Humen railway station

Construction
- Structure type: Underground
- Accessible: Yes

Other information
- Station code: HBA (Pinyin: HMB)

History
- Opened: 15 December 2019 (6 years ago)

Services
Preceding station	Pearl River Delta Metropolitan Region Intercity Railway	Following station
Houjie towards Zhuliao	Guangzhou–Shenzhen intercity railway	Humen East towards Shenzhen Airport
Location

Humen North railway station (Chinese: 虎门北站; pinyin: Hǔmén Běi Zhàn; Cantonese Yale: Fúmùhn Bāk Jaahm) is an underground railway station in Dongguan, Guangdong, China. It is an intermediate stop on the Guangzhou–Shenzhen intercity railway. It opened with the line on 15 December 2019.

The station is located underground and perpendicular to Humen railway station, providing an interchange.
