= HMS Vulture (1843) =

Frigate of the Royal Navy

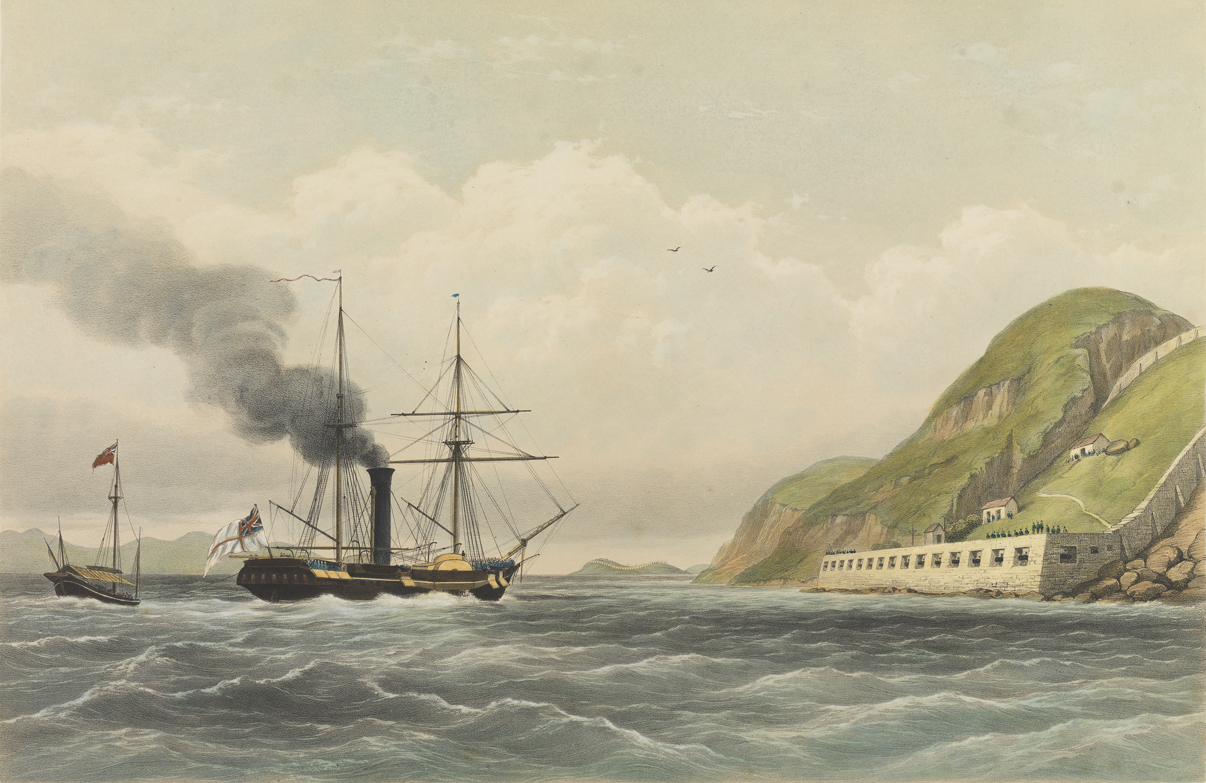
- Vulture passing the Bogue on the way to Hong Kong after the Expedition to Canton, 9 April 1847

History

United Kingdom
- Name: Vulture
- Ordered: 18 March 1841
- Builder: Pembroke Dockyard
- Laid down: September 1841
- Launched: 21 September 1843
- Decommissioned: 1866

General characteristics
- Displacement: 1,960 long tons
- Complement: 175
- Armament: 6 × guns

HMS Vulture was one of three 6-gun, steam-powered Cyclops-class second-class paddle frigates built for the Royal Navy in the 1840s. She was initially deployed to the East Indies where she participated in actions against China and then played a minor role in the Crimean War of 1854–1855. The ship was sold for scrap in 1863.

== Design and construction ==
Vulture had a length at the gun deck of 190 feet 1 inch (57.94 m) and 163 feet 6 inches (49.8 m) at the keel. She had a beam of 37 feet 6 inches (11.4 m), and a depth of hold of 23 feet (7.0 m). The ship's tonnage was 1,19055/94 tons burthen and she displaced 1,960 long tons (1,990 t). Her crew numbered 175–195 officers and ratings.

The ship was fitted with a pair of steam engines rated at 476 nominal horsepower, that had two vertical cylinders of 80-inch (200 cm) diameter with 5 ft 9 in (1.75 m) stroke, that used steam provided by four boilers. The paddle wheels were 26 ft 6 in (8.08 m) diameter to the extremity of the floats, which were 8 ft 9 in (2.67 m) wide. Vulture carried six guns – two 8-inch guns of 95 cwt (Note: "Cwt" is the abbreviation for hundredweight, 56 cwt referring to the weight of the gun.) mounted on pivots at bow and stern, and four 8-inch guns of 65 cwt on broadside trucks.

She was launched on 21 September 1843 and was then fitted with Fairbairn engines in the East India Docks until 23 January 1844. She had cost £24,323 to build and £22,395 to fit out (including £21,429 for the 476 nhp engines). Vulture was first commissioned in February 1845 for the East Indies, and completed fitting for sea (for a further £9,173) at Sheerness Dockyard until 7 June 1845.

== Career ==
She was involved in the Expedition to Canton of 1847. She paid off on return from the East Indies that same year, and then underwent a small repair at Sheerness and Woolwich in 1848–1849 (for £17,334). She was recommissioned in November 1852 and was used in the Baltic theatre of the Crimean War in 1854. She was in action with the Russians on 7 June 1854, in the action at Gamla Carleby, Finland. On 27 August 1855, she ran aground off Hanko Head, Grand Duchy of Finland whilst towing a vessel from Nargen to Farosund. She was severely damaged and was sent back to England for repairs. In February 1859, she ran aground on the Barbary Coast. Vulture was refloated and escorted by HMS Perseverance to Malta, where she arrived on 21 February in a leaky condition. She was recommissioned again in December 1859 for service in the Mediterranean. The ship was paid off on 5 April 1860, and laid up at Portsmouth. She was sold to Castle & Son, Charlton for scrap in October 1863.

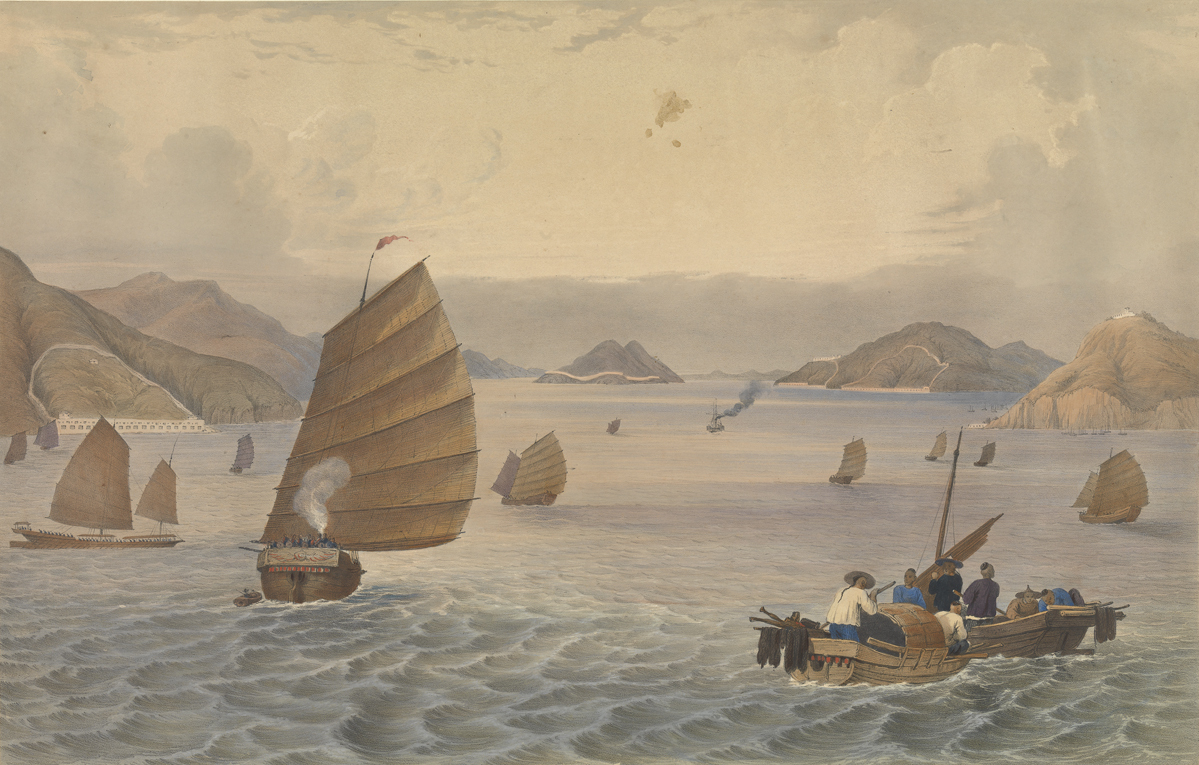
Vulture, with the 18th Royal Irish on board, at the Bogue forts or First Pass of the Canton River, 2 April 1847.

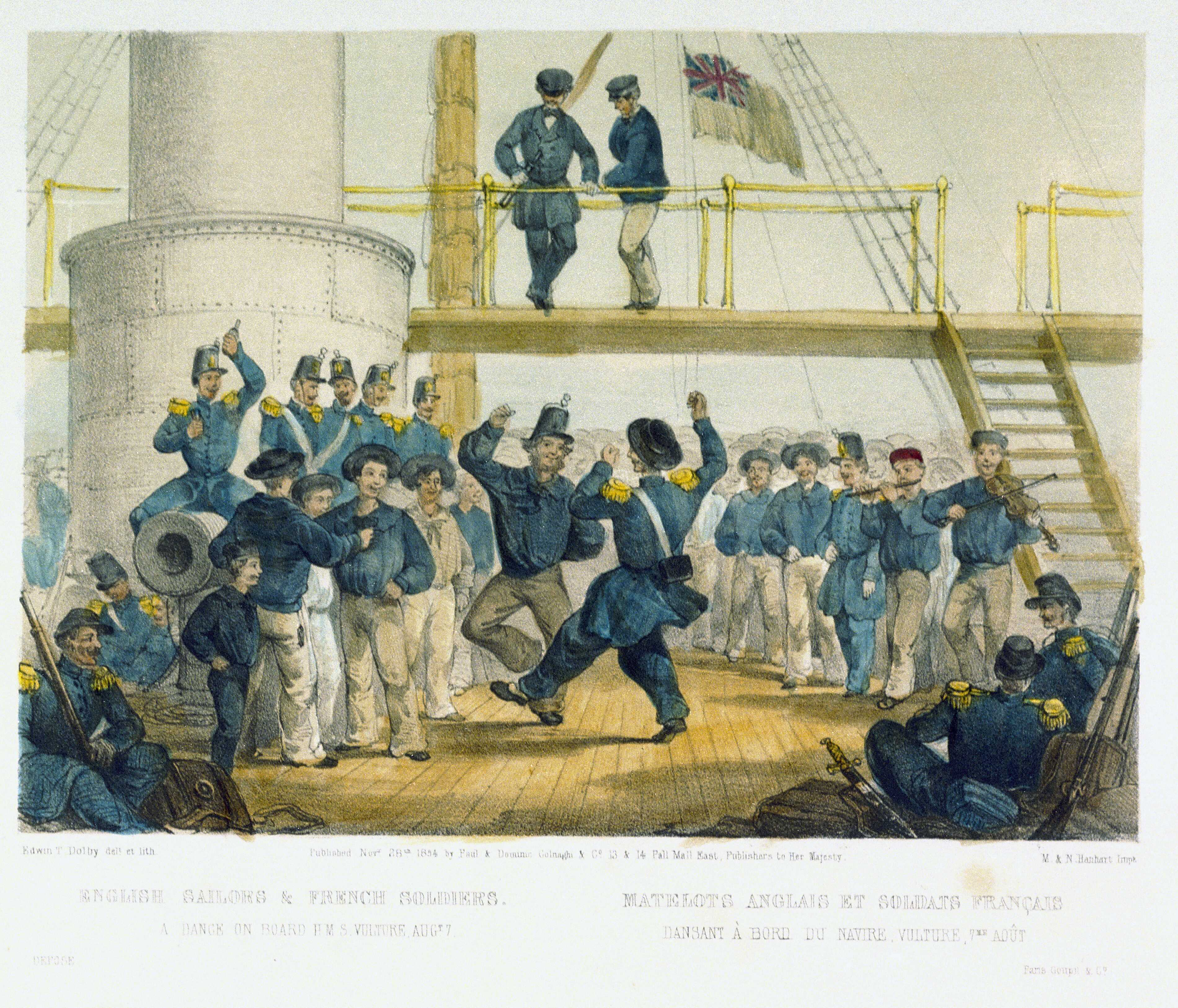
English sailors and French soldiers, dancing on board Vulture in the Baltic, 7 August 1854

== Bibliography ==
- David Lyon and Rif Winfield, The Sail and Steam Navy List 1815–1889. Chatham Publishing, 2004. ISBN 1-86176-032-9.
- Winfield, Rif (2008). British Warships in the Age of Sail, 1793-1817: Design, Construction, Careers and Fates. Barnsley, UK: Seaforth. ISBN 978-1-84415-700-6.
