= Shiziyang Tunnel =

High-speed railway tunnel in China

Coordinates: 22.86669°N 113.55881°E

- Interactive map of Shiziyang Tunnel

Overview
- Line: Guangzhou-Shenzhen-Hong Kong

Operation
- Constructed: China Railway Group; China Railway 12th Bureau Group
- Opened: 26 December 2011

Technical
- Length: 5.3 kilometres 5.5 kilometres
- No. of tracks: 2
- Operating speed: 250km/h (350km/h designed)

The Shiziyang Tunnel is a high-speed railway tunnel under Shiziyang, the northern part of the Pearl River estuary in China.

== Route ==
The 10.8 km long tunnel is part of a 140-kilometer (87 mi)-long high-speed line from Guangzhou to Shenzhen and Hong Kong. It is designed for speeds of up to 350 km/h (usually 250 km/h in operation) - the fastest underwater tunnel in the world. as well as being China's longest underwater tunnel. This allows rail journeys between Guangzhou and Hong Kong to take only 40 minutes – much faster than the previous 2-hour journey. The Guangzhou-Shenzhen-Hong Kong express rail link is part of a broader expansion of high-speed rail in China; journeys from Beijing to Hong Kong will take only 8 hours.

== Construction ==
Construction began in November 2007, with a budget of CNY2.4 billion; the tunnel was completed in 2011, and passenger services began on 26 December 2011. Unusually, the tunnel boring machines were designed to be dismantled inside the tunnel.

== See also ==
- Shiziyang
- Shiziyang Link
- Humen Pearl River Bridge
