= Dongguangang railway station =

Railway station in Dongguan, Guangdong

Dongguangang 东莞港
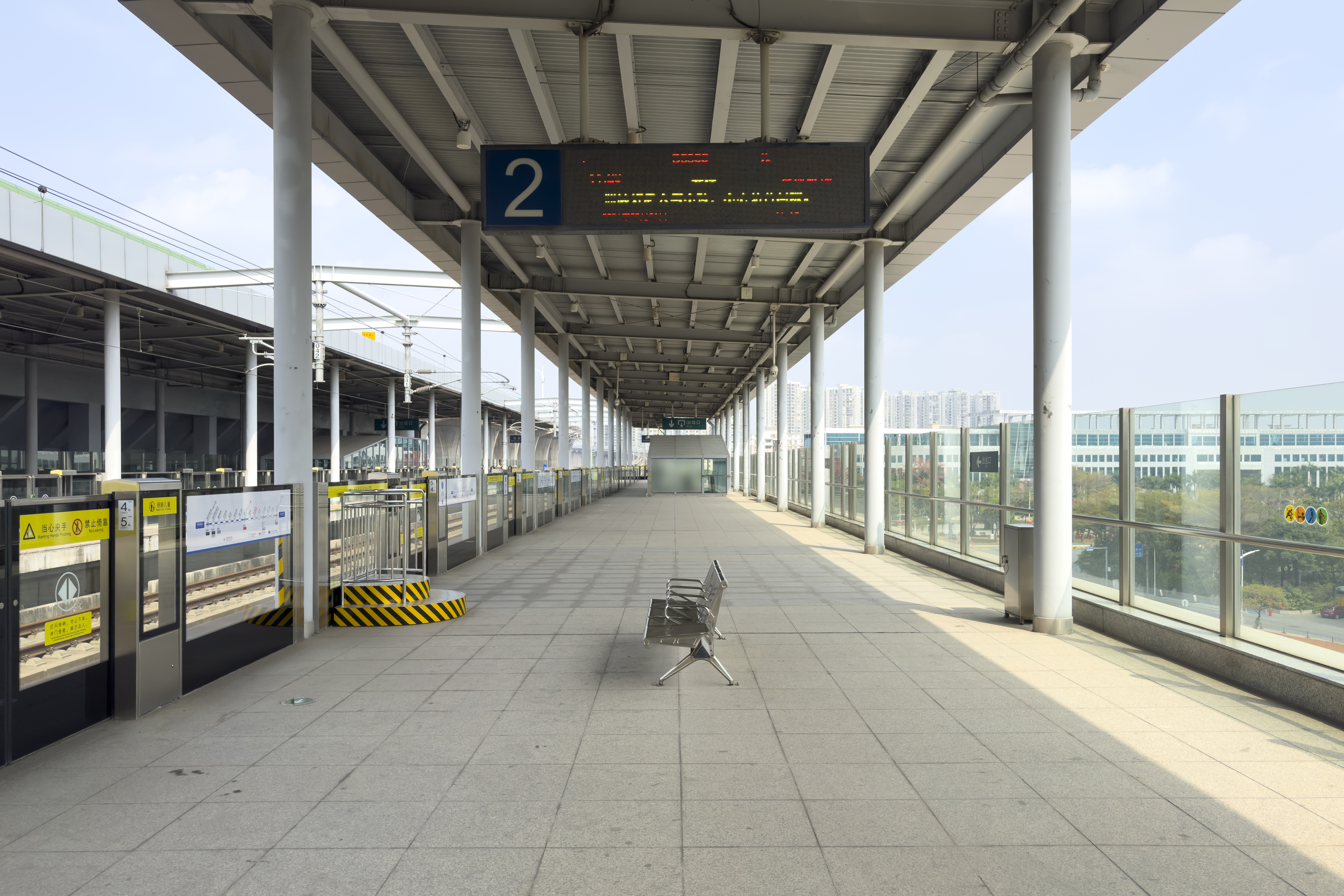
- Platform 2

Chinese name
- Simplified Chinese: 东莞港站
- Traditional Chinese: 東莞港站
Transcriptions
Standard Mandarin
- Hanyu Pinyin: Dōngguān Gǎng Zhàn
Yue: Cantonese
- Yale Romanization: Dūnggúngóng Jaahm
- Jyutping: Dung^{1}gun^{1} Gong^{2} Zaam^{6}

General information
- Location: Shatian, Dongguan, Guangdong; China
- Coordinates: 22°54′38.00″N 113°36′21.83″E
- Owner: Pearl River Delta Metropolitan Region intercity railway
- Operator: Guangdong Intercity
- Line: Guangzhou–Shenzhen intercity railway
- Platforms: 2 (2 side platforms)
- Tracks: 2

Construction
- Structure type: Elevated
- Accessible: Yes

Other information
- Station code: DGA (Pinyin: DGG)

History
- Opened: 15 December 2019 (6 years ago)

Services
Preceding station	Pearl River Delta Metropolitan Region Intercity Railway	Following station
Hongmei towards Zhuliao	Guangzhou–Shenzhen intercity railway	Houjie towards Shenzhen Airport
Location

Dongguangang railway station (simplified Chinese: 东莞港站; traditional Chinese: 東莞港站; pinyin: Dōngguǎn Gǎng Zhàn; Cantonese Yale: Dūnggúngóng Jaahm; lit. 'Dongguan Port railway station') is a railway station in Dongguan, Guangdong, China. It is an intermediate stop on the Guangzhou–Shenzhen intercity railway and was opened on 15 December 2019.

The station has two side platforms.
