= Guangzhou Nansha Economic and Technological Development Zone =

Area of Guangzhou, China

Guangzhou Nansha Economic and Technological Development Zone (Chinese: 广州南沙经济技术开发区) is a national economic development zone in China, which was established in 1993. It is located at Nansha District, the southeast of Guangzhou, and on the west bank of Humen Watercourse in the estuary of the Pearl River. It has a developed area of 17.67 square kilometres.

Plastic, chemical, electronic, food processing and shipbuilding are the main industries in the zone.
