= Houjie =

Houjie 厚街镇
- Town
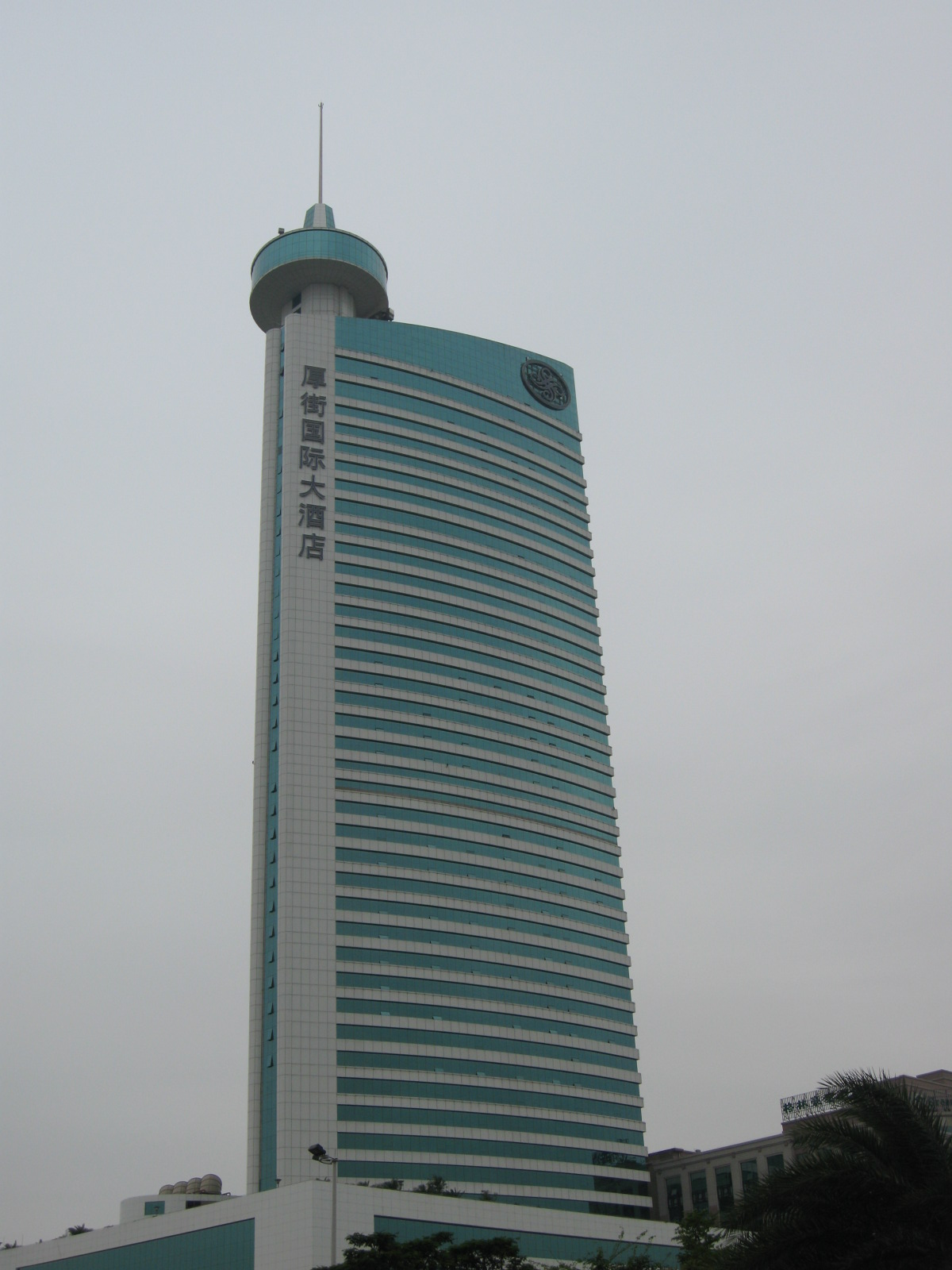
- A hotel in Houjie

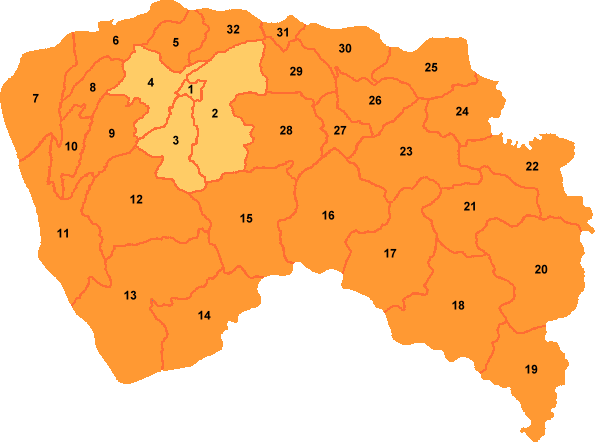
- Houjie is labeled '12' on this map of Dongguan

- Location in Guangdong
- Coordinates (Houjie government): 22°56′12″N 113°40′16″E
- Country: People's Republic of China
- Province: Guangdong
- Prefecture-level city: Dongguan

Area
  - Total: 125.7 km^{2} (48.5 sq mi)
- Time zone: UTC+8 (China Standard)

Houjie (simplified Chinese: 厚街镇; traditional Chinese: 厚街鎮; pinyin: Hòujiē Zhèn) is a town under the jurisdiction of the prefecture-level city of Dongguan, Guangdong, China. The town spans an area of 125.7 square kilometres (48.5 mi^{2}), has a registered hukou population of 95,055 as of 2008, and a permanent population of 550,807 as of 2020.

== Toponymy ==
When the area was first established during the Southern Song dynasty, it was known as Houjie (Chinese: 后街; pinyin: Hòujiē; lit. 'behind the street'), since one well-known traveler chose to reside in a location behind a major building in town. Later, the town chose to change the first character, as another character pronounced hou (Chinese: 厚; pinyin: hòu) was used in words meaning honest and kind (Chinese: 淳厚; pinyin: chún hòu) and abundant (simplified Chinese: 丰厚; traditional Chinese: 豐厚; pinyin: fēng hòu).

== History ==
Houjie was built as a village in 1122.

In 1957, Houjie became a township, but was changed to a people's commune one year later. In 1983, the Houjie People's Commune was abolished, and Houjie became a district. In 1987, it became a town, which it remains to this date.

== Geography ==
Located in the western portion of Dongguan, Houjie lies approximately 15 kilometres (9.3 mi) from Dongguan's urban center, and 47 nautical miles from Hong Kong. The area is part of the Guangdong–Hong Kong–Macau Greater Bay Area on the Pearl River Delta.

The Henggang Reservoir is located in Houjie.

It borders the town of Humen to the south, and Dongguan's urban center to the north.

== Administrative divisions ==
Houjie administers the following 24 residential communities:

- Zhuxi Community (Chinese: 竹溪社区)
- Houjie Community (Chinese: 厚街社区)
- Shanmei Community (Chinese: 珊美社区)
- Liaosha Community (Chinese: 寮厦社区)
- Hetian Community (Chinese: 河田社区)
- Tingshan Community (Chinese: 汀山社区)
- Huangang Community (Chinese: 环冈社区)
- Santun Community (Chinese: 三屯社区)
- Baotun Community (Chinese: 宝屯社区)
- Chenwu Community (Chinese: 陈屋社区)
- Chiling Community (Chinese: 赤岭社区)
- Qiaotou Community (Chinese: 桥头社区)
- Nanwu Community (Chinese: 南五社区)
- Xitou Community (Chinese: 溪头社区)
- Shatang Community (Chinese: 沙塘社区)
- Baotang Community (Chinese: 宝塘社区)
- Xiabian Community (Chinese: 下汴社区)
- Baihao Community (Chinese: 白濠社区)
- Xintang Community (Chinese: 新塘社区)
- Shuanggang Community (Chinese: 双岗社区)
- Yongkou Community (Chinese: 涌口社区)
- Dajing Community (Chinese: 大迳社区)
- Xinwei Community (Chinese: 新围社区)
- Hujing Community (Chinese: 湖景社区)

== Demographics ==
According to the 2000 Chinese Census, 368,038 people were permanent residents of Houjie. However, in 2008, the town had a registered hukou population of just 95,055. This vast difference is likely a result of large-scale migration from more rural areas, resulting in large amounts of people with hukou registration in their previous residences.

== Economy ==
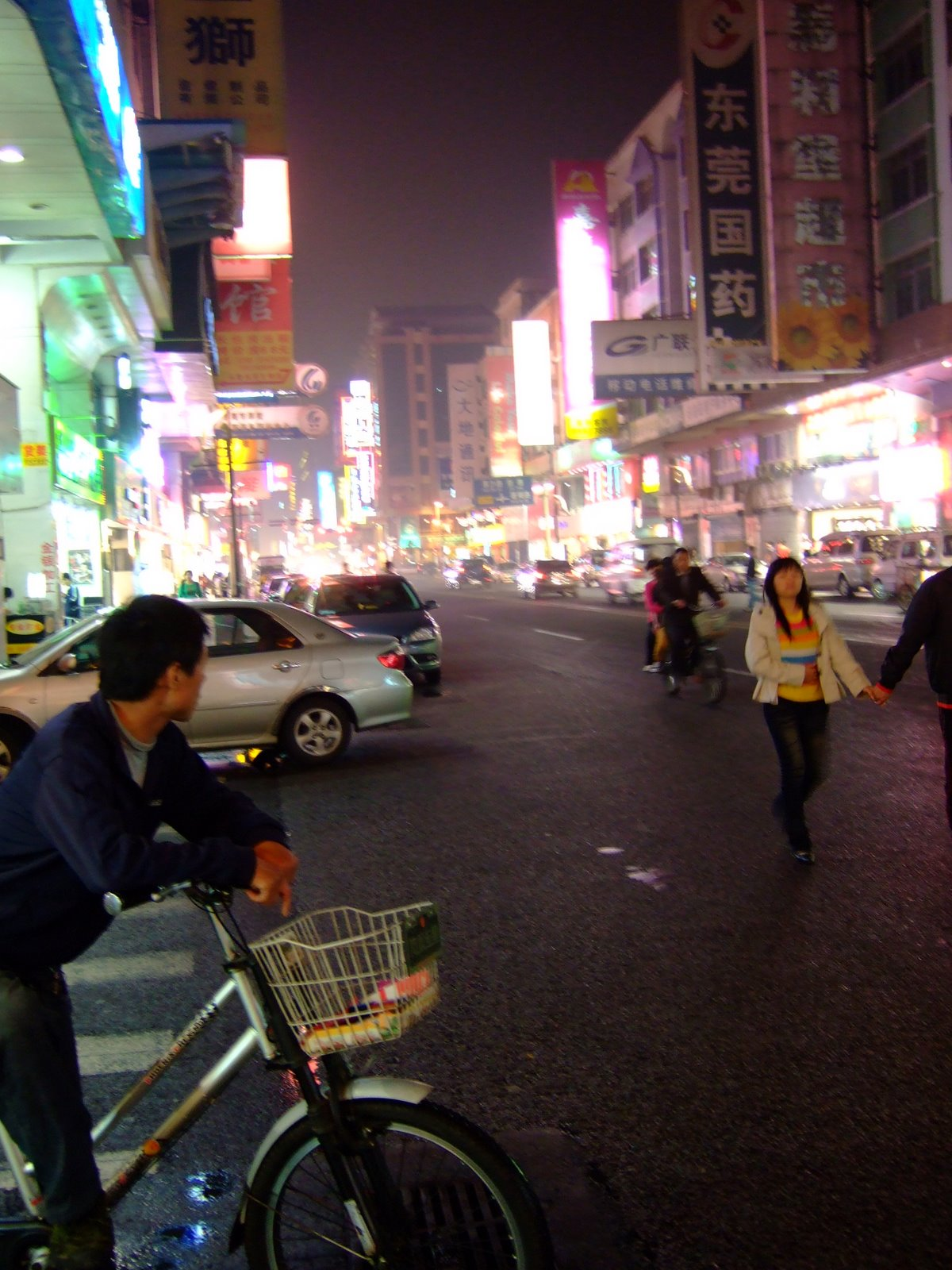
A nighttime street scene in Houjie

As of 2020, Houjie's gross domestic product (GDP) totaled 41.572 billion RMB. The same year, consumer retail sales in Houjie totaled 7.246 billion RMB. Major companies with operations in Houjie include Samsung and Tyco.

Major products produced in Houjie include furniture, electromechanical equipment, footwear, and jewelry. The town also produces Guancao (Dongguan Grass) and sausages. Due to reform and opening up, the town industrialized and urbanized. In recent years, it has been successfully honored as a "Town of Hygiene in China", "Famous Town of Exhibitions in China", "Town with the Strongest Education in Guangdong", and a "Civilized Town of Dongguan City".

According to the town government, Houjie is home to more than 270 restaurants, and more than 130 hotels.

Houjie is famous with for its shoe design and manufacturing center, mainly focused on branded shoes.

In 1998, American labor activist Charles Kernaghan documented the scenes of the Liang Shi Handbag Factory, a sweatshop located in Houjie. He found that this factory paid wages as low as 0.13 USD per hour, made their employees work 10 hour shifts six or seven days per week, failed to fully pay employees, lacked any sort of fire exits, and housed their workers in cramped and dirty dorm rooms which were under 24 hour surveillance. The factory mostly employed young women migrant workers hailing from rural regions. This expose received major attention in the American press, because it was one of the sweatshops producing handbags branded by American celebrity Kathie Lee Gifford.

== Transportation ==
The Beijing–Hong Kong and Macau Expressway runs through Houjie.

== Tourism ==
Historical sites within Houjie include the Haiyueyan, the Shenxianshui (Chinese: 神仙水), Aotai Academy (Chinese: 鳌台书院), and the Hetian Fang Ancestral Hall (Chinese: 河田方氏宗祠).
