= Expedition to Canton =

British military expedition against Qing forts.

Coordinates: 23°6′34.6″N 113°19′58″E

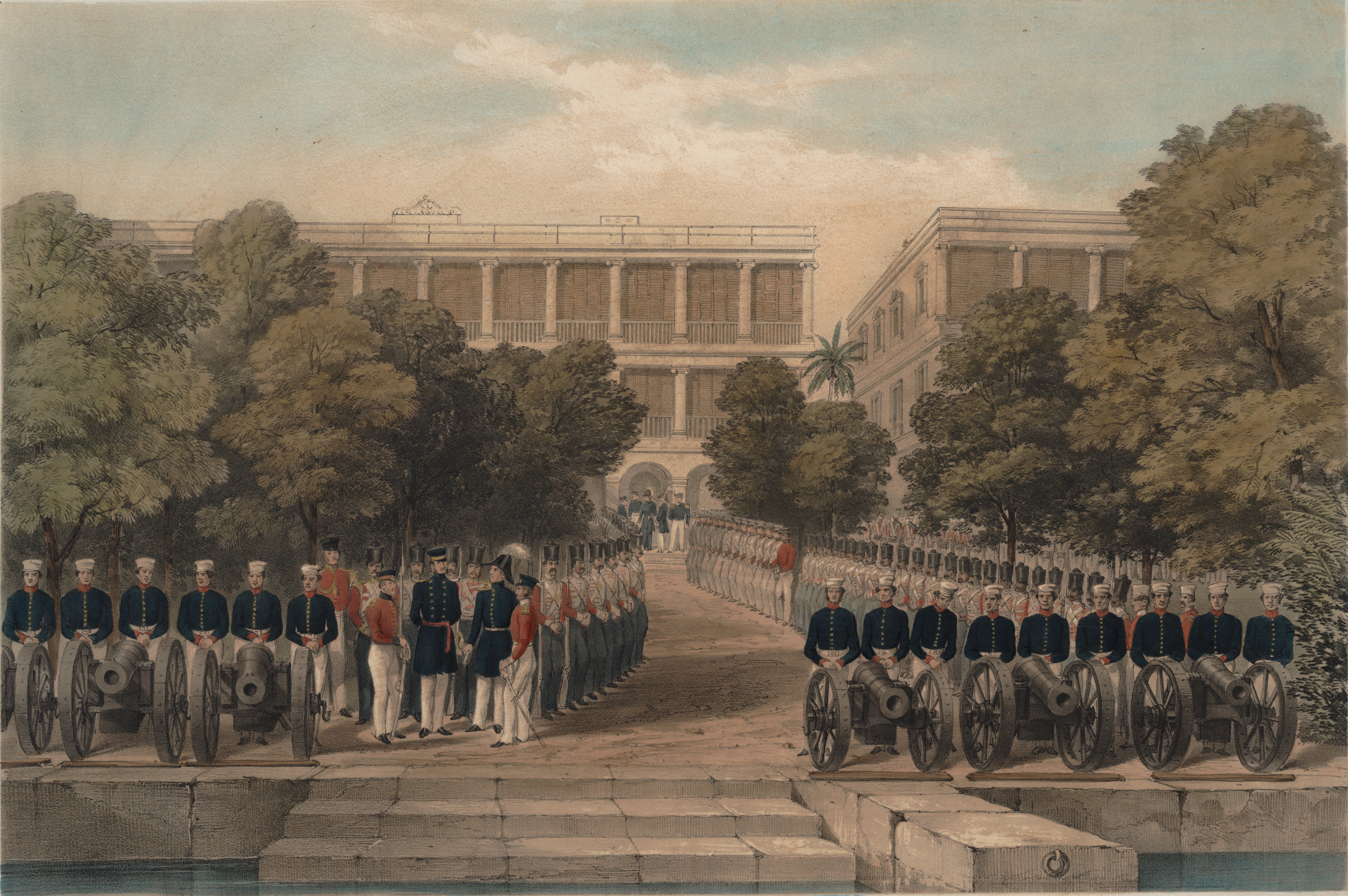
- British troops awaiting the arrival of Commissioner Keying at the British Factory in Canton
Date	2–3 April 1847
Location	Pearl River, Guangdong, China
Result	British victory

Belligerents
United Kingdom: British East India Company	Qing China

Commanders and leaders
John Davis; George D'Aguilar	Keying

Strength
966 troops 6 ships	Unknown

Casualties and losses
No casualties	No casualties 879 guns captured

The Expedition to Canton was a British punitive expedition that captured the forts along the Pearl River, Guangdong province, China, on 2–3 April 1847. Beginning at the Humen Strait (Bogue), the British captured the forts leading up to the city of Canton (Guangzhou). The operation was in response to British subjects being attacked by the Chinese near Canton. Hong Kong Governor John Davis demanded redress from Chinese Commissioner Keying.

Unsatisfied with his reply, Davis ordered Major-General George D'Aguilar, the commander-in-chief of British forces in China, to seize the forts approaching Canton and to prepare for an attack on the city to force reparations on the spot. The forts were captured, but Canton was spared after Keying agreed to punish the culprits and to allow entry into the city.

== Operations ==
On the afternoon of 1 April 1847, D'Aguilar received communication from Davis with orders to proceed to Canton with force. At midnight, the following forces were embarked:

- HMS Vulture – 427 troops, 18th Royal Irish Regiment
- HMS Espiegle – 149 troops, 42nd Regiment Madras Native Infantry
- East India Company steamer Pluto – 280 troops, 42nd Regiment
- Hired armed steamer Corsair – 110 troops, 18th Regiment
- Hired lorcha No. 1 – Armed as a gunboat, detachment of Royal Artillery with ordnance stores
- Hired lorcha No. 2 – Detachment of Royal Sappers and Miners with tools, scaling ladders, and other materials

British operations began with the capture of the Bogue forts. Listed are the number of ordnance captured at each site:

- Anunghoy Island – 208
- North Wangtong Island – 150
- South Wangtong Island – 109

Further up the Canton River past Whampoa Island, the British encountered a staked barrier and captured the following locations:

- Pachow Fort – 64
- Wookongtap Fort – 41
- Napier's Island – 49
- Whampoa Creek – 65

In the final phase, the British captured the forts outside the city of Canton:

- French Folly – 38
- Dutch Folly – 23
- Rogue Fort – 26
- Zigzag Battery – 20
- Segment Battery – 30
- Shameen Battery – 56

== Gallery ==
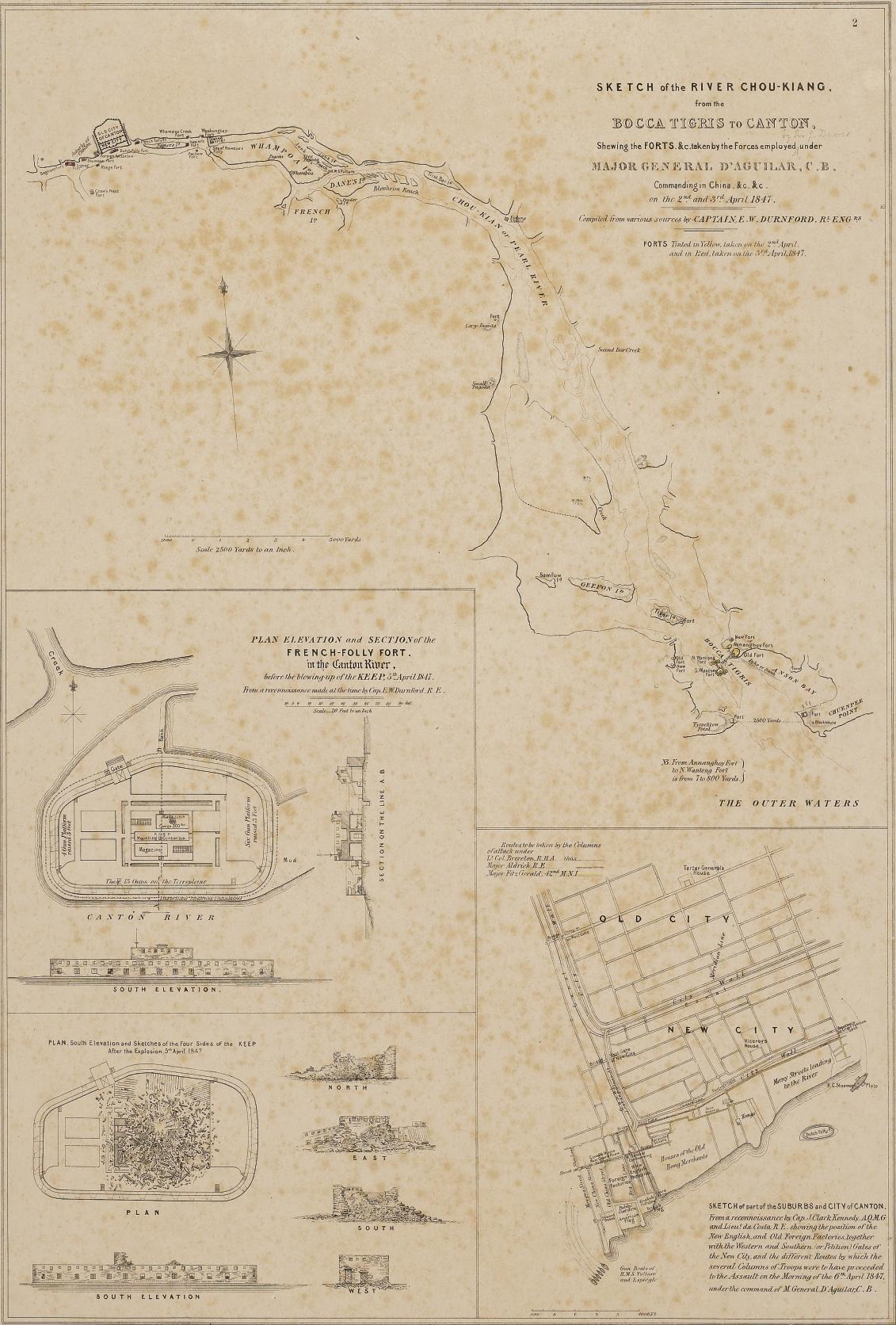
Map of the expedition

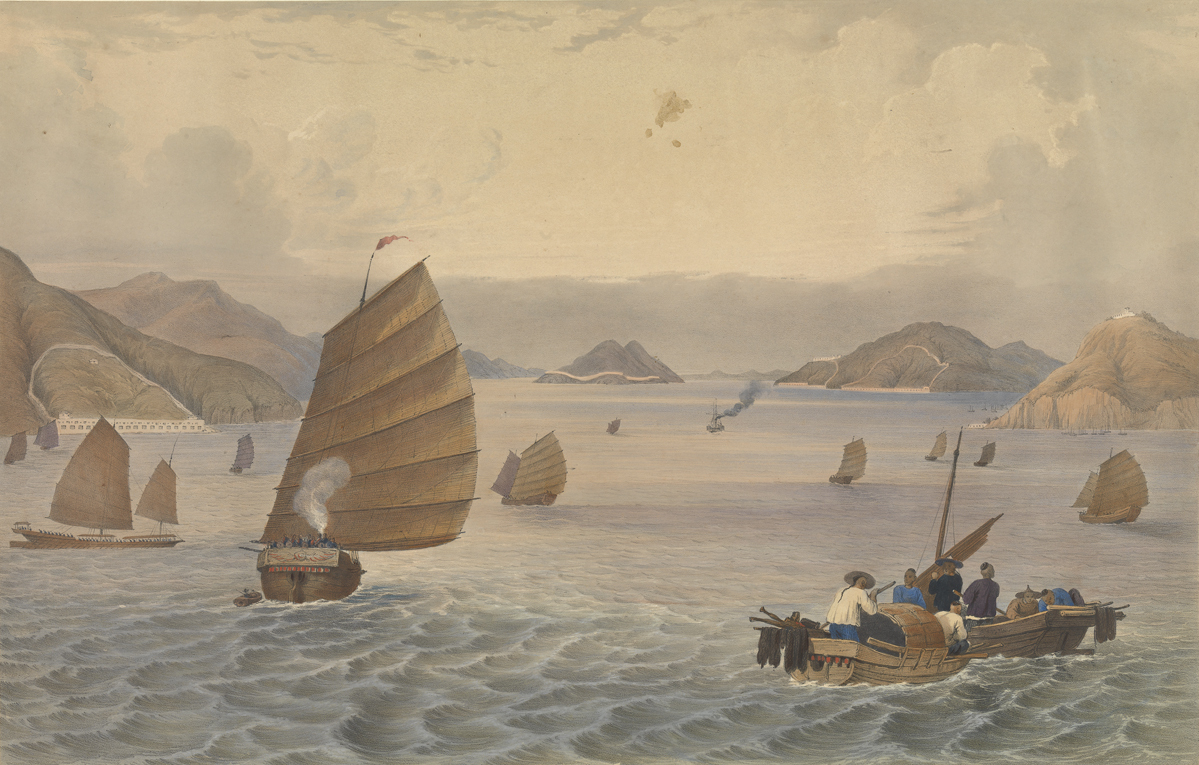
HMS Vulture starting operations at the Bogue, 2 April

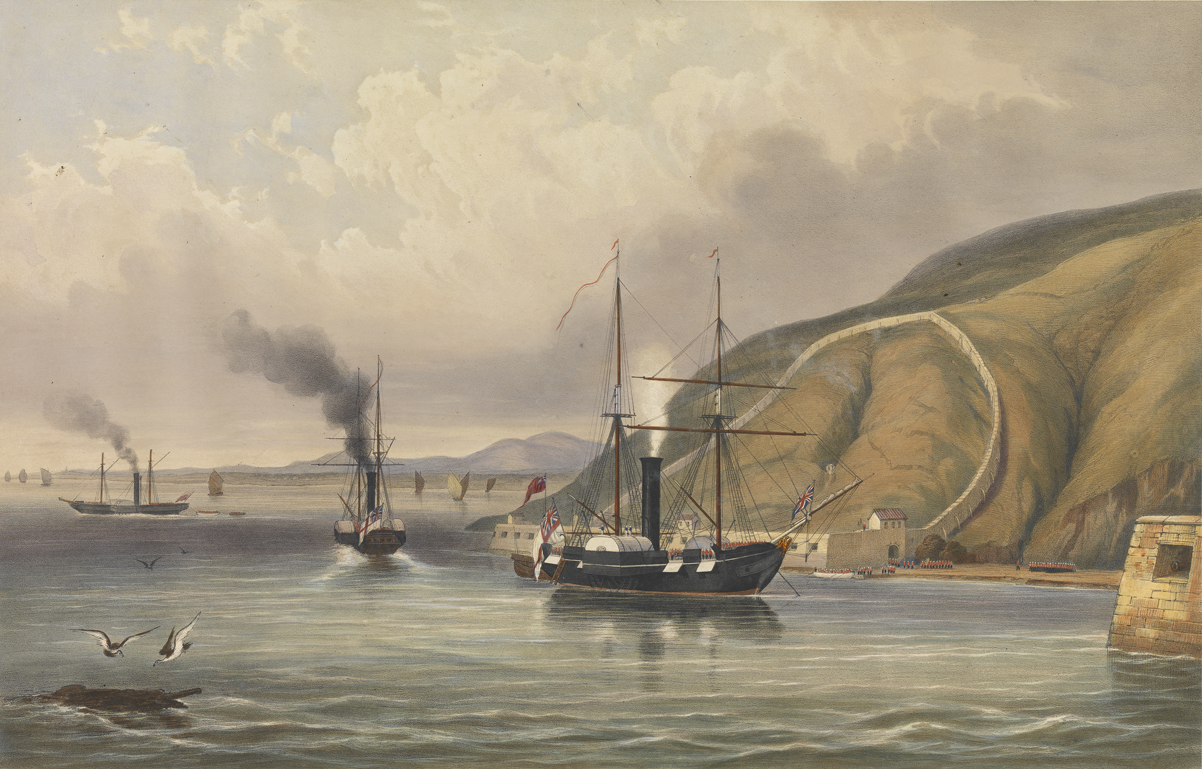
Capture of Anunghoy, 2 April

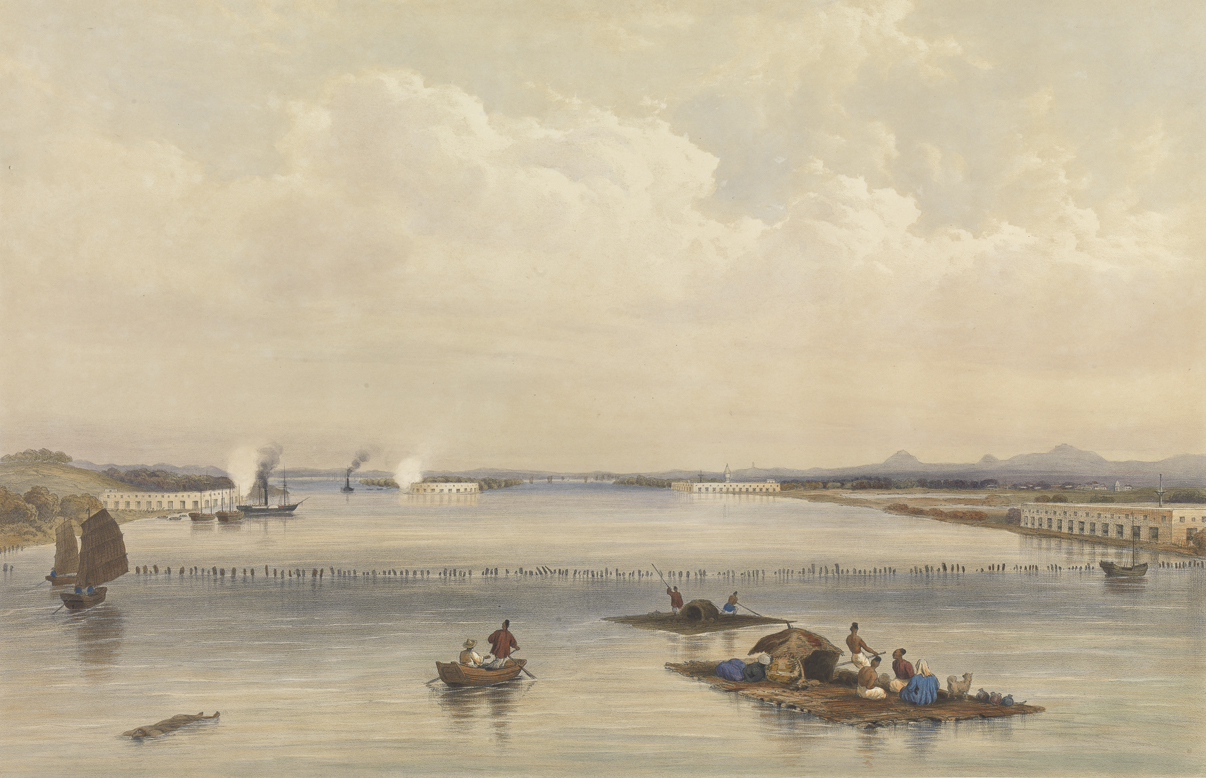
Attacking the batteries near the staked barrier above Whampoa Island

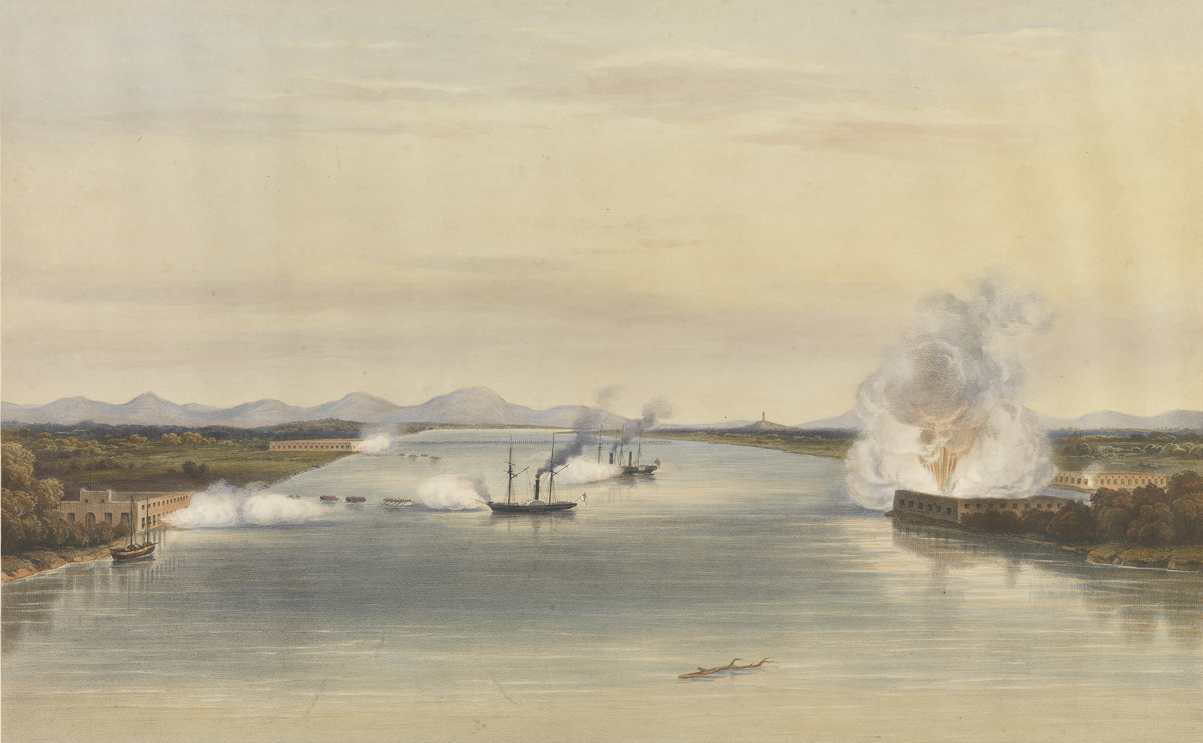
Attacking the forts of Wookongtap and Whampoa Creek, 3 April

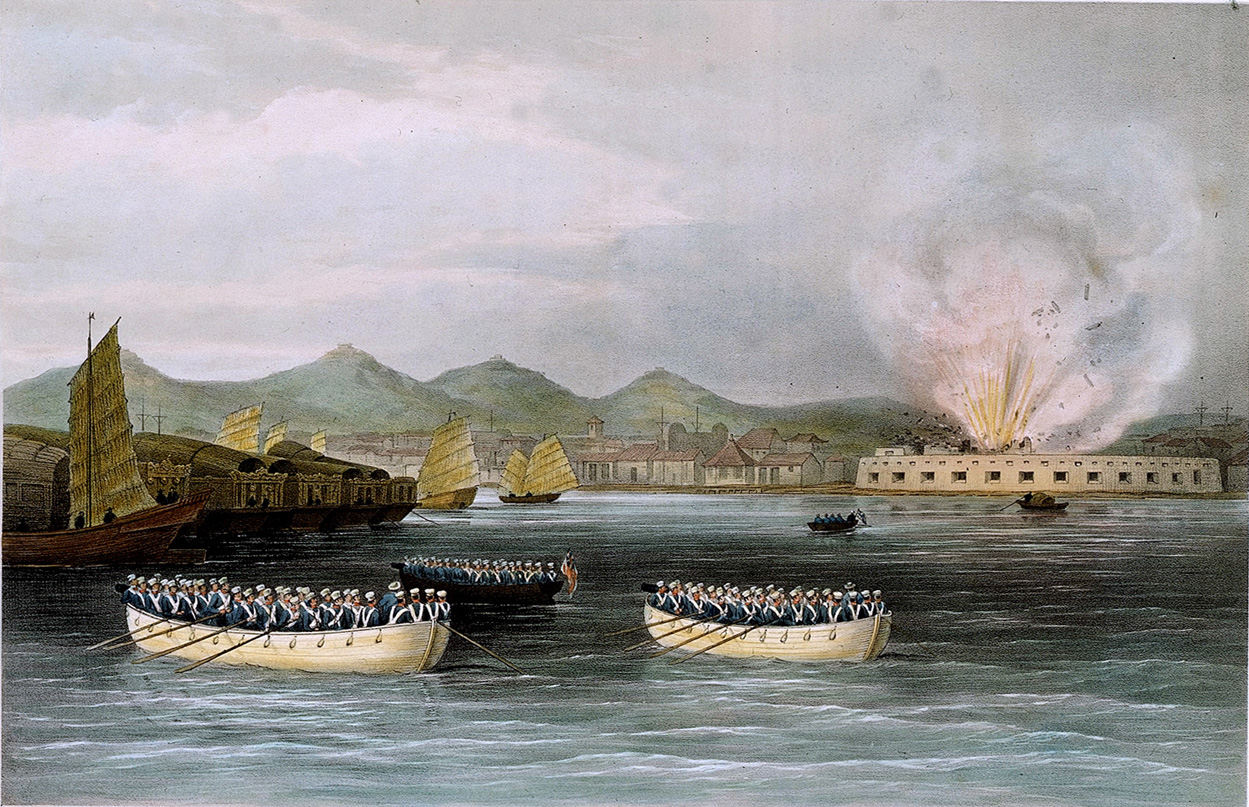
Royal Sappers and Miners blow up the French Folly Fort
