= Humen =

Strait in Guangdong, China

Coordinates: 22.7933°N 113.5979°E

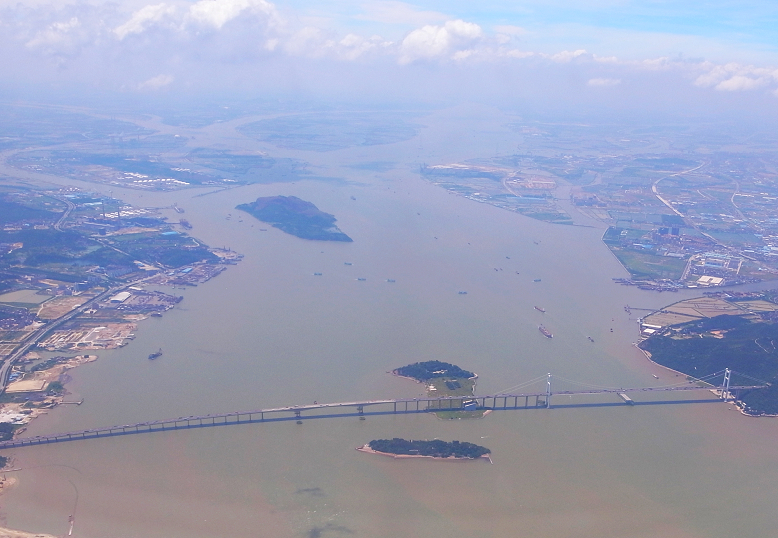
- View of the Humen Bridge over the strait
- Traditional Chinese: 虎門
- Simplified Chinese: 虎门
- Postal: Hu-mun
- Literal meaning: The Tiger Gate
Transcriptions
Standard Mandarin
- Hanyu Pinyin: Hǔmén
- Wade–Giles: Hu-men
Yue: Cantonese
- Jyutping: Fu^{2} mun^{4}

The Humen, also known as the Bocca Tigris or the Bogue, is a narrow strait in the Pearl River Delta that separates Shiziyang in the north and Lingdingyang in the south. It is located near Humen Town in China's Guangdong Province. It is the site of the Pearl River's discharge into the South China Sea. It contains the Port of Humen at Humen Town. The strait is formed by the islands of Chuenpi (穿鼻, p Chuanbi) and Anunghoy (阿娘鞋, p Aniangxie; also called 威远, p Weiyuan) on the eastern side, and Taikoktow (大角头, p Dajiaotou) on the western side. Since 1997, the strait has been traversed by the Humen Pearl River Bridge. Bocca Tigris was the entry to China's only trading city, Canton.

== Name ==
The Latinate Bocca Tigris is derived from the Portuguese Boca do Tigre, which is a calque of the Mandarin Chinese and Cantonese name 虎門, literally meaning "The Tiger Gate". The name Bogue is also a corruption of the Portuguese Boca.

The name comes from the impression given by Tiger Island, situated about 3.2 km (2.0 mi) above the Hengdang Islands in the middle of the strait, of a tiger couchant or at least of a tiger's head on its eastern side. American Commodore Matthew Perry, who later played a leading role in the opening of Japan to the West, noted that: "Although the resemblance is not at first very striking, it becomes quite obvious after examination".

== History ==
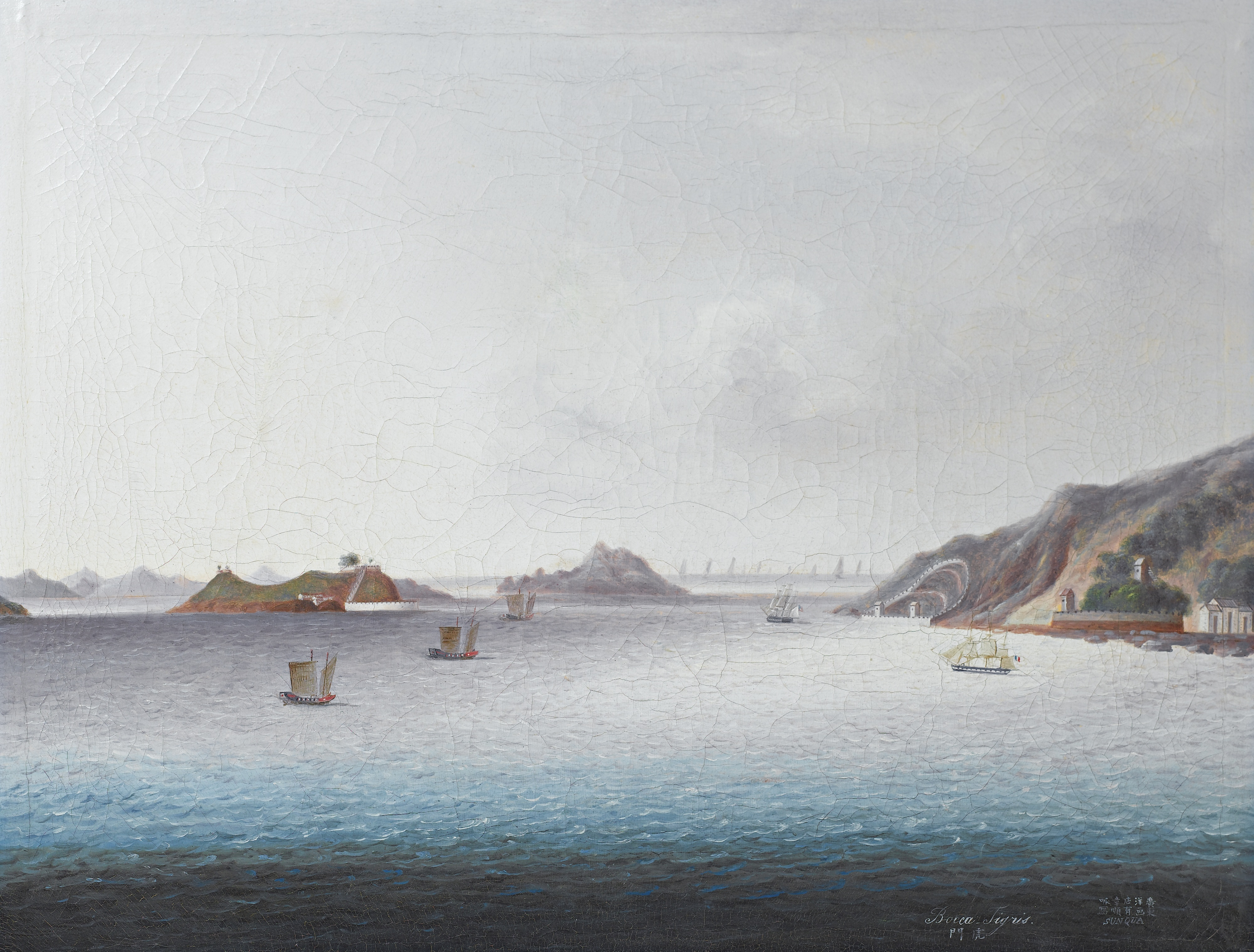
Painting inscribed Bocca Tigris by Chinese painter Sunqua, c. 1830

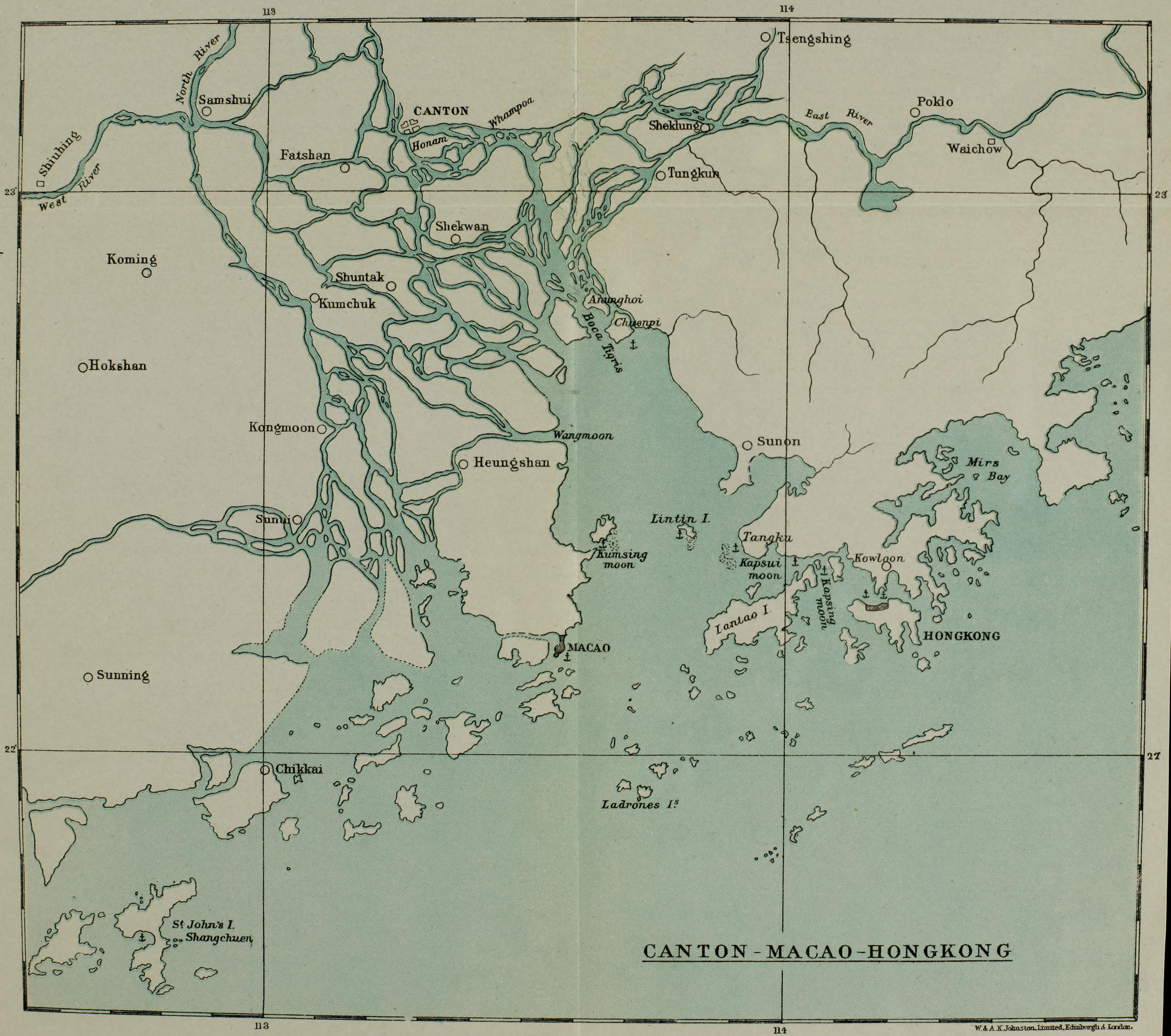
English map of the Pearl River Delta, showing the Humen as the "Boca Tigris"

Because of its strategic location as the naval gateway to the city of Guangzhou (Canton), the strait was strongly fortified during 1702. It was defended by eight forts: Shakok (Shajiao), Taikok (Dajiao), Wangtung (Hengdang), Yung-an (Yong'an), Kung-ku (Gonggu), Chen-yuan (Zhenyuan), Ching-yuan (Jingyuan), and Wei-yuan. Between September 1809 and January 1810, Portuguese Navy ships based in Macau defeated the Guangdong Pirate Confederation in a set of engagements within Humen at the Battle of the Tiger's Mouth.

The first major battle of the First Opium War between the United Kingdom and China occurred at the entrance of the Humen in the First Battle of Chuenpi on 3 November 1839. The British captured the Bogue forts in the Second Battle of Chuenpi on 7 January 1841 and the Battle of the Bogue on 23–26 February. The forts were recaptured on 2 April 1847 during the British Expedition to Canton. In the Second Opium War, the British recaptured the forts in the 1856 Battle of the Bogue on 12–13 November.

== Geography ==
- Eastern shore: Humen Town in Dongguan City
- Western shore: the Nansha District of Guangzhou City
- Upper and Lower Hengdang Islands (横档岛), or North and South Wangtong Islands, in the middle of the strait
- Humen Pearl River Bridge
- Several Qing dynasty forts, including:
  - Weiyuan Fort (威远炮台), near Humen Town
  - Shajiao Fort (沙角炮台), in Humen Town
- Nansha Pier (新南沙客运港), in the Nansha District, 1.6 km (0.99 mi) south of the Humen Bridge

== Port of Humen ==
The Port of Humen at Humen Town serves as the port of the industrial city of Dongguan and as one of the big logistic hubs of the Pearl River Delta. It extends on the east shore of the delta beyond the strait all the way to the Dongjiang River. It is divided into five port areas:

- Shatian Port Area (沙田港区): focuses on containers, chemicals, yard logistics, shoreline industry, and comprehensive trading services.
- Mayong Port Area (麻涌港区): focuses on grain, vegetable oil, coal, construction materials, and break-bulk cargo.
- Shajiao Port Area (沙角港区): focuses on passenger transport, leisure boating, and coastal transport and cabotage.
- Chang'an Port Area (长安港区): focuses on large-scale deep-water berths and the waterfront industry.
- Neihe Port Area (内河港区): focuses on traditional waterborne transport services for the Dongguan industries.

The port has 72 km^{2} (28 sq mi) of territorial waters and 32 km^{2} (12 sq mi) of jurisdictional area. The main navigation channel is 13.5 m (44 ft) deep, enough for vessels of 100,000 DWT. Originally called Taiping port, the State Council approved it as an open port in 1983. It was merged with the Shatian port in June 1997 and renamed Humen port.

== See also ==
- Destruction of opium at Humen (1839)
- Treaty of the Bogue (1843)
