= Humen Bridge =

Bridge in Humen, Guangdong, China

Humen Bridge 虎门大桥
- Coordinates: 22°47′35″N 113°36′31″E
- Carries: G9411 Dongguan–Foshan Expressway
- Crosses: Pearl River
- Locale: Dongguan and Guangzhou, Guangdong, China

Characteristics
- Design: Suspension bridge Segmental concrete bridge
- Total length: 3,618 m (11,870 ft)
- Longest span: 888 m (2,913 ft) (suspension); 270 m (890 ft) (segmental)

History
- Construction cost: US$370 million (segmental)
- Opened: 9 June 1997

Location
- Interactive map of Humen Bridge

The Humen Bridge (simplified Chinese: 虎门大桥; traditional Chinese: 虎門大橋; pinyin: Hǔmén Dàqiáo; Jyutping: Fu^{2}mun^{4} Dai^{6}kiu^{4}), also known as Humen Pearl River Bridge, is a bridge over the Humen, Pearl River in Guangdong Province, southern China. It consists of two main spans — a suspension bridge section and a segmental concrete section. It connects the Nansha District of Guangzhou to Humen Town of Dongguan. Completed in 1997, the suspension bridge has a main span of 888 meters, and the segmental concrete section's main span of 237 meters is among the longest such spans in the world. It forms part of the G9411 Dongguan–Foshan Expressway. The newer Nansha Bridge (Chinese: 南沙大桥), built to reduce the traffic problems on the Humen Bridge, opened to traffic in April 2019.

== Features ==
The bridge is divided into five sections: the east approach, the suspension bridge section, the middle approach, the segmental concrete section, and the west approach. Hurricanes are common occurrences, so the design wind speed at the bridge deck level was established at 61 m/s.

== Incidents ==
On May 5, 2020, the bridge was caught on camera violently shaking up and down. At 15:32 local time, the bridge was shut down by traffic police for safety reasons. According to Chinese state-run media, engineers inspected the main structure of the bridge, and it was found to be intact. Experts told Chinese media that the shaking was normal, and would not affect the safety of driving if the shaking was contained to a tolerable range. At 16:30 on May 7, the navigable waters of the bridge resumed navigation. On May 10, the bridge passed the structural safety assessment. On May 15, the bridge resumed traffic, but buses with more than 40 seats and trucks were prohibited from passing.

== Gallery ==
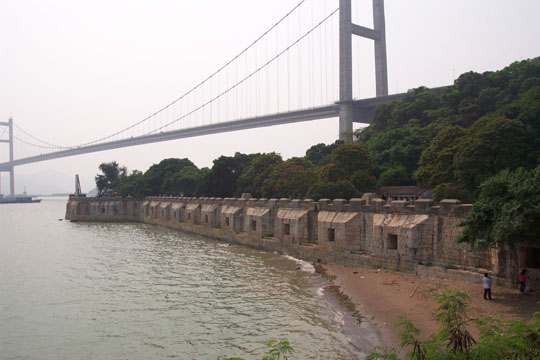
Humen Bridge and Weiyuan Fort in the foreground

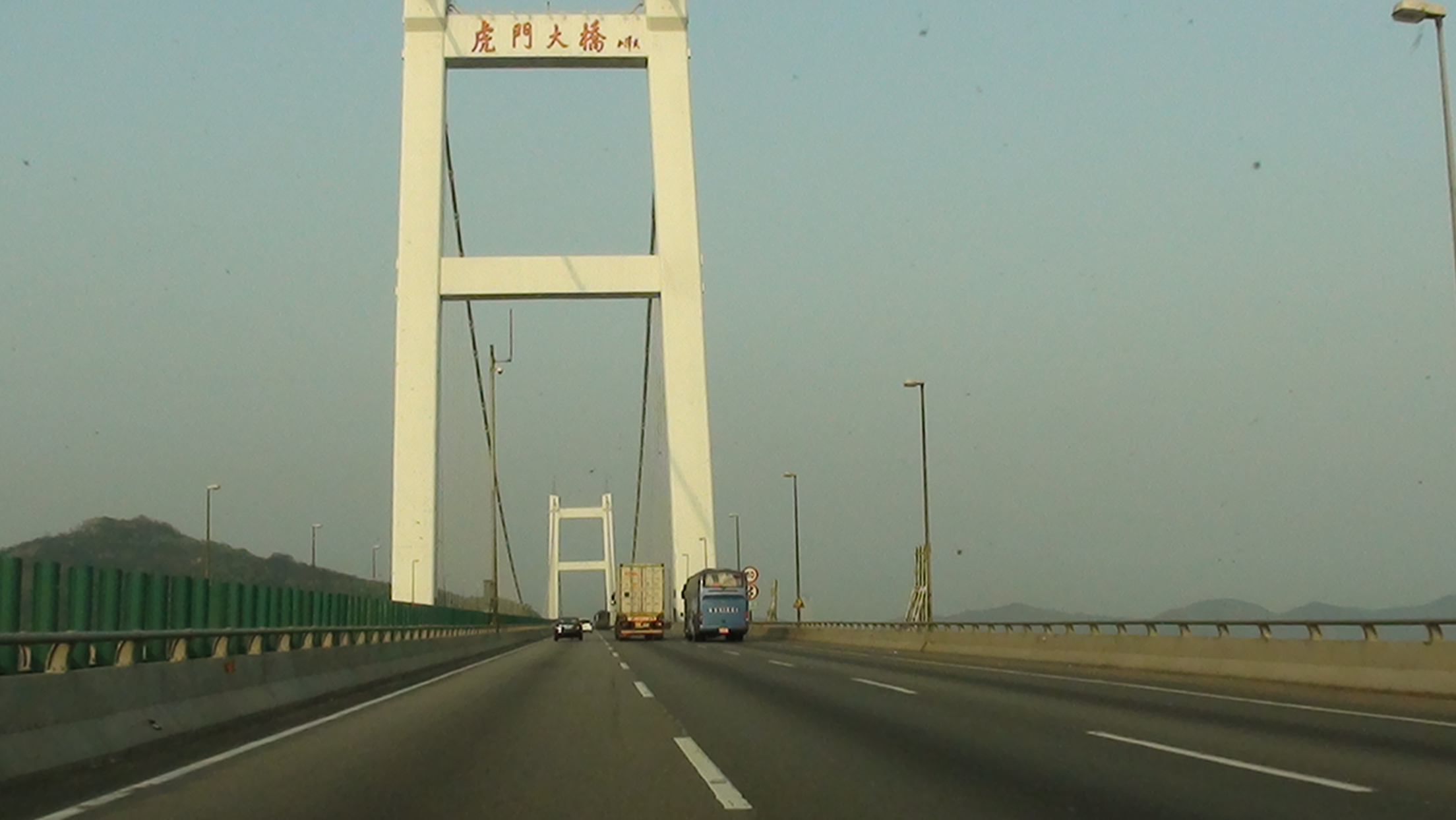
View from the deck of the Humen Pearl River Bridge

== See also ==
- List of longest suspension bridge spans
- List of largest bridges in China
