= Humen Town =

Humen 虎门镇
- Town
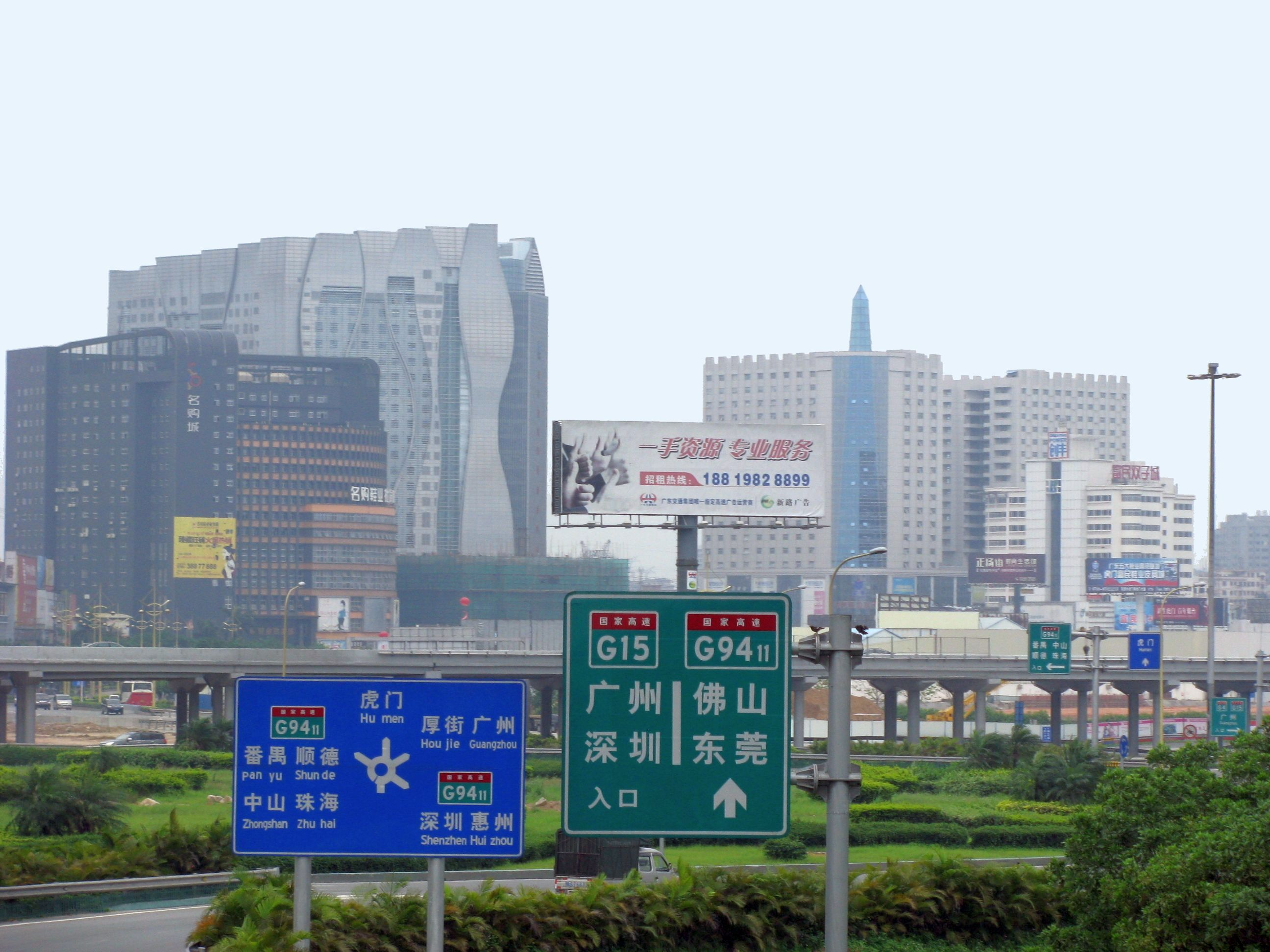

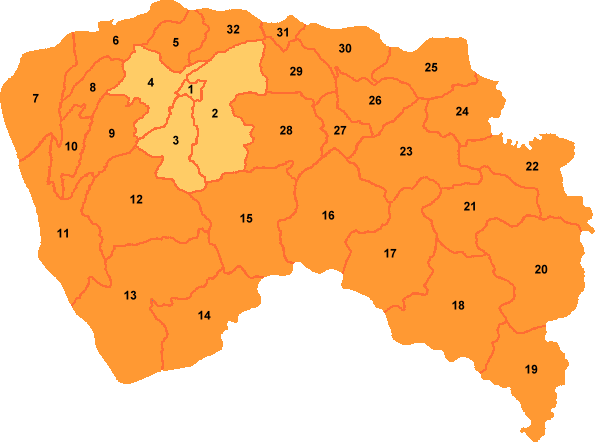
- Humen is labeled '13' on this map of Dongguan

- Location in Guangdong
- Coordinates: 22°48′53″N 113°40′21″E
- Country: People's Republic of China
- Province: Guangdong
- Prefecture-level city: Dongguan

Population (2020)
  - Total: 838,144
- Time zone: UTC+8 (China Standard)

Humen Town (simplified Chinese: 虎门镇; traditional Chinese: 虎門鎮; pinyin: Hǔmén zhèn; Jyutping: Fu^{2}mun^{4} zan^{3}), formerly Fumun, is a town in Dongguan city on the eastern side of the Humen strait on the Pearl River Delta, in Guangdong province, China. The former town of Taiping was incorporated into Humen Town in 1985. The population was 838,000 in 2023, making it the second most populous town (zhèn) in China (after Chang'an in Dongguan as well).

== History ==
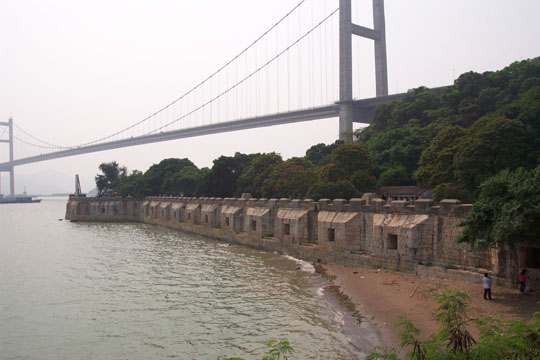
The Weiyuan Fort and the Humen Bridge

The history of Humen is linked to the First Opium War (1839–1842). It was at Humen that Lin Zexu supervised the destruction of large quantities of seized opium in 1839. Some major battles in the First Opium War were fought here and on the waters of the Bocca Tigris.

== Economy ==
Humen has many consumer goods factories. These factories fueled population expansion from emigrating workers around the country seeking factory jobs. Humen is geographically advantageous for the factories due to its proximity to two large metropolitan cities and export harbors of Hong Kong and mainland China's Shenzhen. Humen is an important gateway to south China. Going upstream, ships in the Pearl River can reach the eastern, northern and western regions of Guangdong and even parts of Guangxi province. The main port, Humen Port, is a first-class port open to foreign vessels.

== Tourist attractions ==
Sea Battle Museum Park entrance

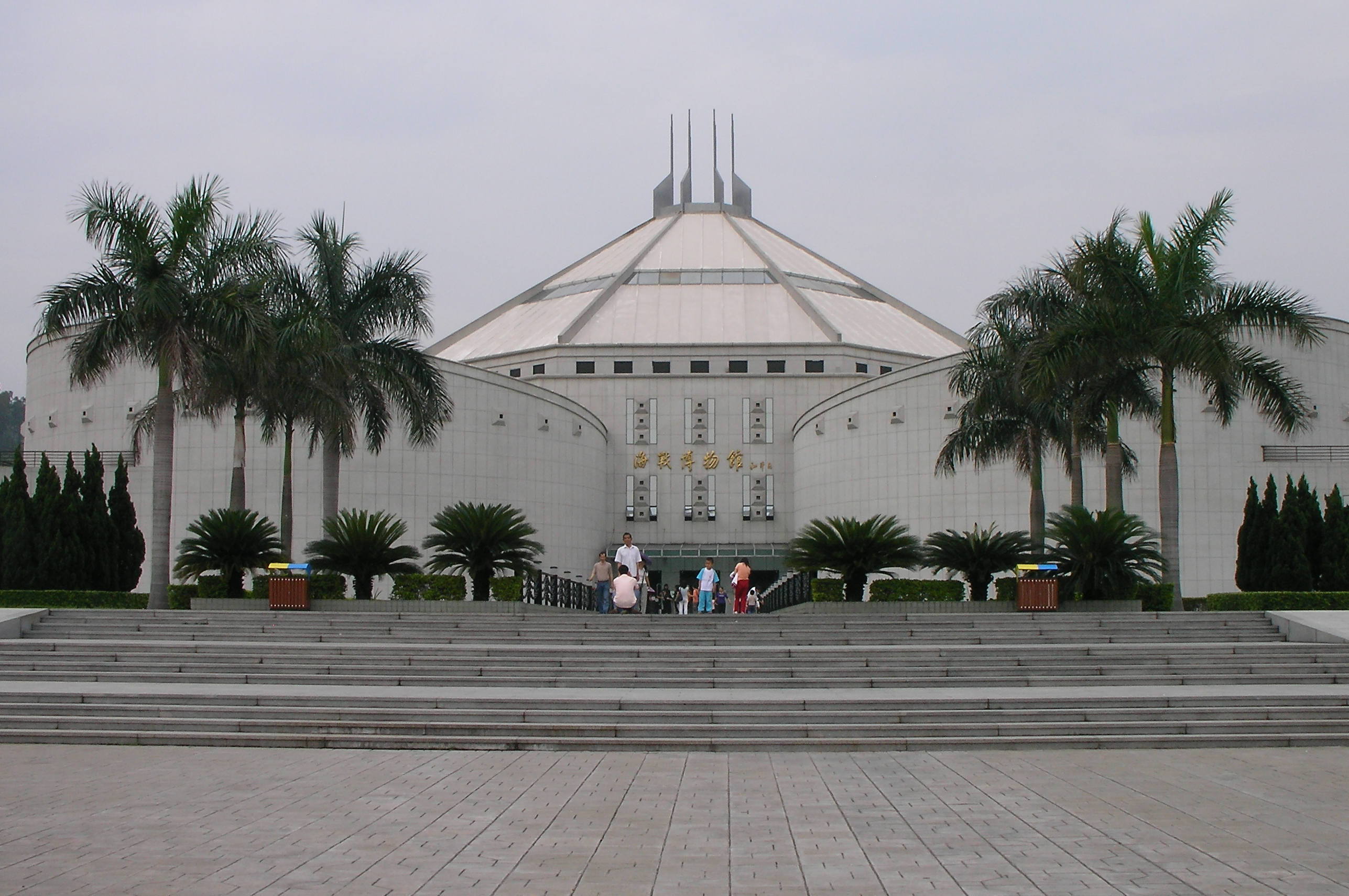
Sea Battle Museum

- The "Sea Battle Museum", which has dioramas and displays featuring the First Opium War and the Second Opium War, may be reached by taking number 8A or 8B bus to its westernmost stop.
- The Opium War Museum also known as the Lin Zexu Memorial Museum
- Former Residence of Jiang Guangnai

Several Qing dynasty forts, including:

- Weiyuan Fort (simplified Chinese: 威远炮台; traditional Chinese: 威遠砲臺), located near the "Sea Battle Museum" and almost directly under the Humen Pearl River Bridge
- Shajiao Fort (simplified Chinese: 沙角炮台; traditional Chinese: 沙角砲臺); lit. "sand corner" fort), where the Convention of Chuenpi was signed in 1841 during the First Opium War
- Eyi Fort (simplified Chinese: 鹅夷炮台; traditional Chinese: 鵝夷砲臺)
- Jingyuan Fort
- Zhenyuan Fort

== Transportation ==
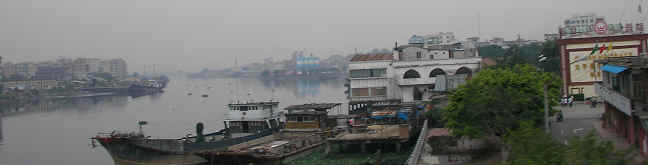
Humen May 5, 2007

Humen is located at the eastern end of the Humen Pearl River Bridge.

Humen is served by regular direct buses traveling south from Guangzhou. Routes continue south by bus to Shenzhen's Window of the World theme park, from where it is possible to continue on to the Hong Kong border by bus or the Shenzhen Metro.

There is a bus service from Humen Town to Shenzhen Bao'an International Airport in Shenzhen. A ferry service connects Humen Ferry Terminal to Hong Kong International Airport's SkyPier.
