= Shenzhen–Hong Kong high-speed train =

Railway service in China and Hong Kong

Shenzhen–Hong Kong high-speed train 深港高速动车组列车 深港高速動車組列車
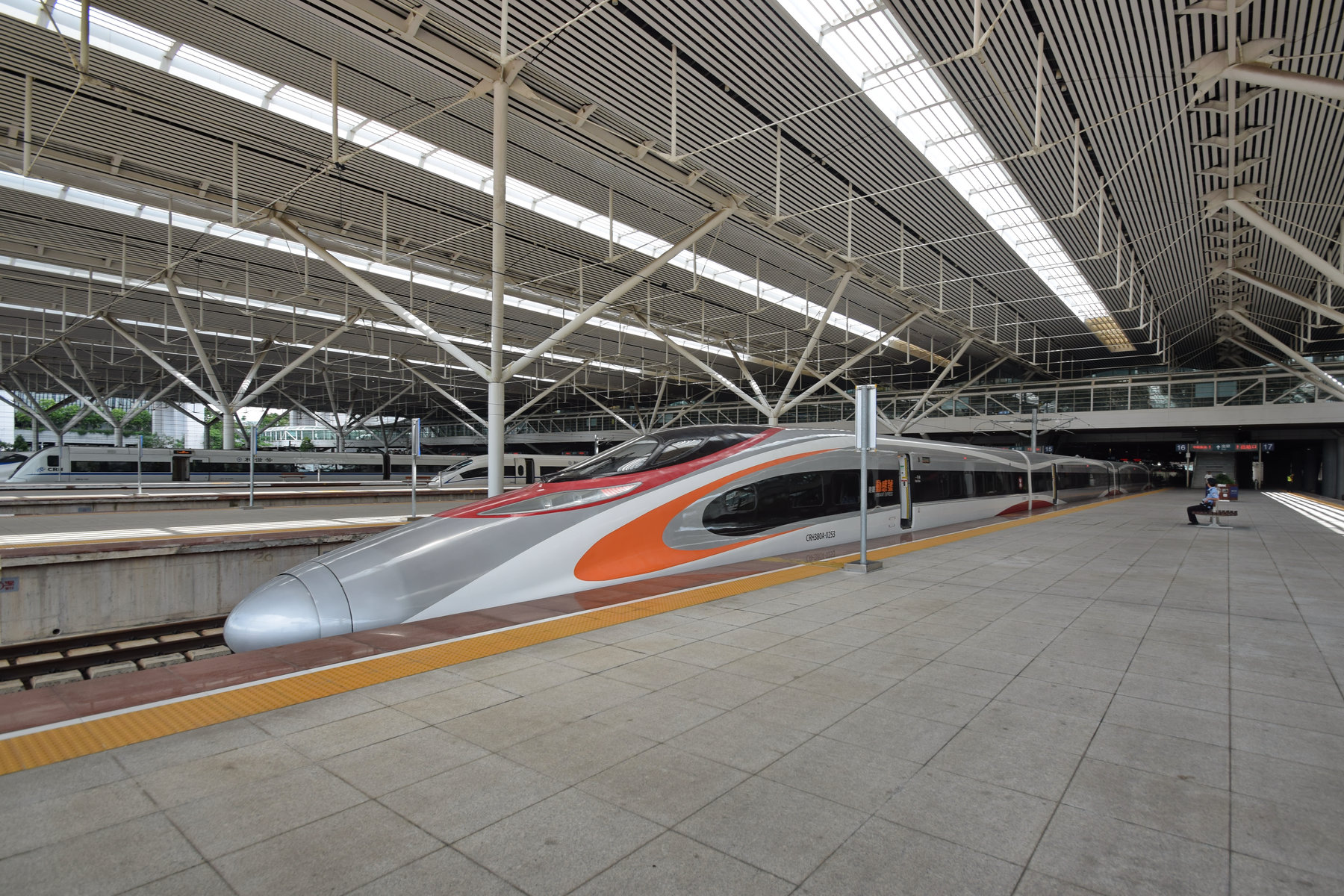
- An MTR CRH380A EMU at Shenzhen North

Overview
- Service type: G-series trains
- Status: Operational
- Locale: Guangdong province; Hong Kong SAR
- First service: 23 September 2018
- Current operator(s): China Railway High-speed; MTR

Route
- Termini: Shenzhen North; Futian; Hong Kong West Kowloon
- Train number(s): G5701-5714, G5720-5755 (Shenzhen North↔West Kowloon); G5801-5810, G5813-5832 (Futian↔West Kowloon)
- Line(s) used: Guangzhou–Shenzhen–Hong Kong XRL

On-board services
- Class(es): Business seat (CR400AF-A only); First class seat; Second class seat
- Catering facilities: Dining car (Vibrant Express not included); Trolley refreshment service

Technical
- Rolling stock: CRH1A-A; CR400AF-A; Vibrant Express
- Track gauge: 1,435 mm (4 ft 8 1/2 in)
- Electrification: 25 kV 50 Hz AC (Overhead line)
- Operating speed: 200 km/h
- Track owner(s): CR Guangzhou; MTR

The Shenzhen–Hong Kong high-speed train (simplified Chinese: 深港高速动车组列车; traditional Chinese: 深港高速動車組列車) are high-speed train services operating between Shenzhen and Hong Kong.

Although categorized as G-series trains, of which the top-speed is commonly 300-350 km/h, the top-speed for trains on this service is 200 km/h.

== History ==
The high-speed train services between Shenzhen and Hong Kong was commenced on 23 September 2018 when the Hong Kong section of the Guangzhou–Shenzhen–Hong Kong XRL was opened.

The G5711 train towards Hong Kong West Kowloon and G5736 train towards Shenzhen North are the trains on the debut service.

== Operations ==
The G5701-5714 (Shenzhen North↔West Kowloon) and G5801-5804 (Futian↔West Kowloon) trains are operated by CR Guangzhou, while others trains are operated by MTR.

=== Other services ===
Some other long-haul train services also provide high-speed train connections between Shenzhen and Hong Kong.

- The G79/80 Beijing–Hong Kong high-speed train
- The G99/100 Shanghai–Hong Kong high-speed train
- The G6113/6114 Changsha–Hong Kong high-speed train
- The G314/1 and G312/3 Kunming–Hong Kong high-speed train
- Shantou–Hong Kong high-speed train
- Xiamen–Hong Kong high-speed train
- The G3001/3002 Fuzhou–Hong Kong high-speed train

== Rolling stocks ==
The trains operated by CR Guangzhou often use CRH1A-A or CR400AF-A EMUs, and the MTR trains are operated with MTR CRH380A (Vibrant Express) EMUs. The formations for the trains on the service are shown below.

=== CRH1A-A ===
Car No.	1	2-3	4	5-7	8
Type	ZY; First class	ZE; Second class	ZEC; Second class/Dining Car	ZE; Second class	ZY; First class

=== CR400AF-A ===
The 16-car CR400AF-A trains are the only type on this service to offer business seats.

Car No.	1	2	3-7	8	9	10-14	15	16
Type	SW; Business	ZY; First class	ZE; Second class	ZE; Second class	ZEC; Second class/Dining car	ZE; Second class	ZY; First class	ZYS; Business/First class

=== Vibrant Express ===
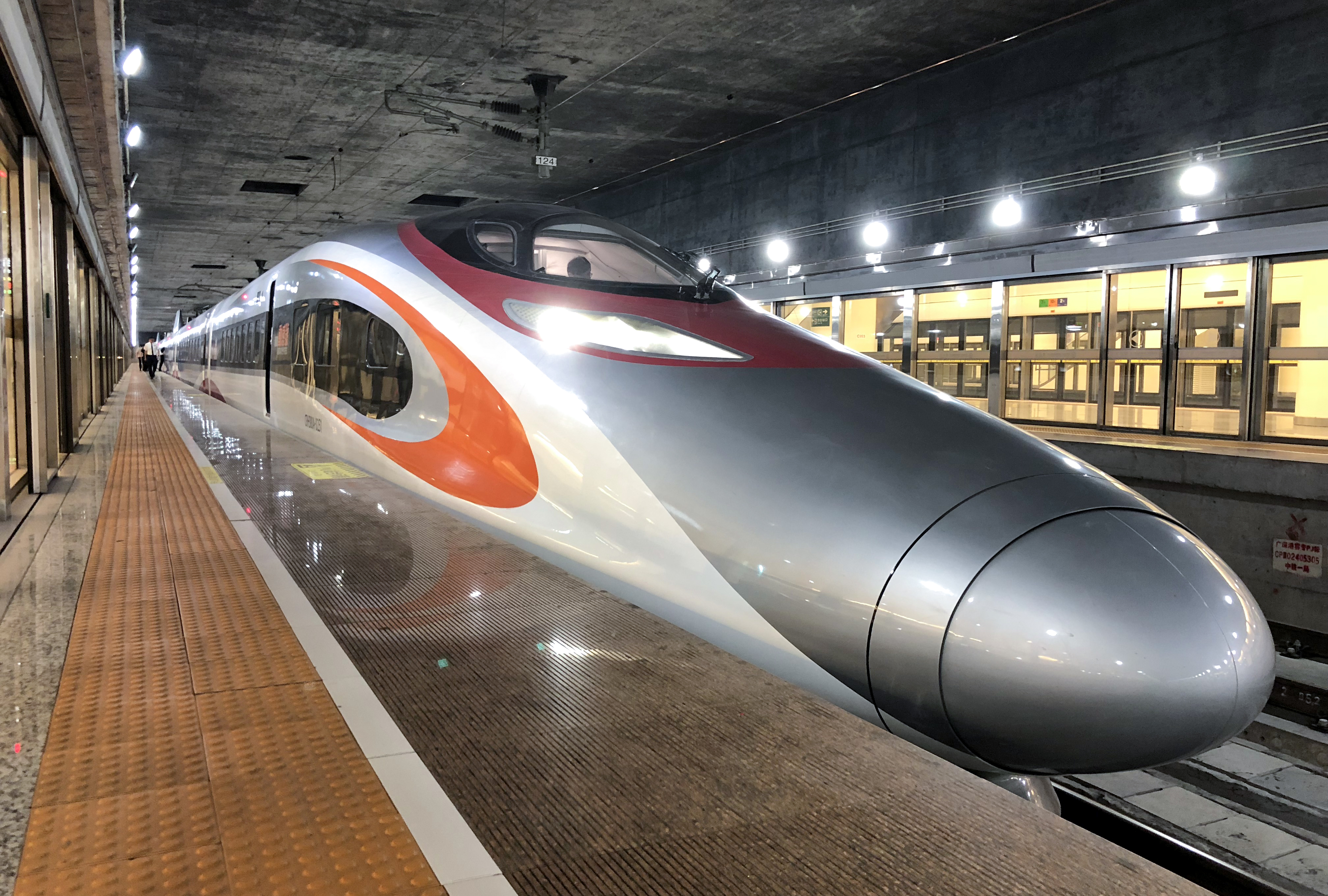
A MTR Vibrant Express train at Futian

The Vibrant Express of MTR are operated by 8-car trainsets with first and second class seats only. A total of 68 first class seats are available in the first and last cars in 2+2 formation. The middle cars offer 511 second class seats in 3+2 formation, with wheelchair spaces are provided on the seventh car.

Car No.	1	2-6	7	8
Type	ZY; First class	ZE; Second class	ZE; Second class	ZY; First class
