= Express Rail =

Express Rail may refer to:

- Express Rail Link, a Malaysian airport railway
- Guangzhou–Shenzhen–Hong Kong Express Rail Link, a high-speed rail line in China and Hong Kong
  - Hong Kong Express Rail Link, the Hong Kong section of the line
- ExpressRail, a network of rail yards at the Port of New York and New Jersey
- GO Regional Express Rail, the former name of the Go Expansion project in Toronto
