= MTR CSR Sifang EMU =

MTR CSR Sifang EMU may refer to either of the either of MTR's rolling stock:

- MTR CSR Sifang EMU (XRL), a MTR high-speed train to run on the Guangzhou–Shenzhen–Hong Kong Express Rail Link
- MTR CSR Sifang EMU (Local), a future MTR rolling stock to run on Kwun Tong line, Tsuen Wan line, Island line and Tseung Kwan O line
- MTR CSR Sifang EMU (LAR), a future MTR rolling stock to run on Tung Chung line and Airport Express.
- MTR CSR Sifang EMU (DRL), a future MTR rolling stock to run on Disneyland Resort line.
