= G-series trains =

Chinese high-speed passenger train class

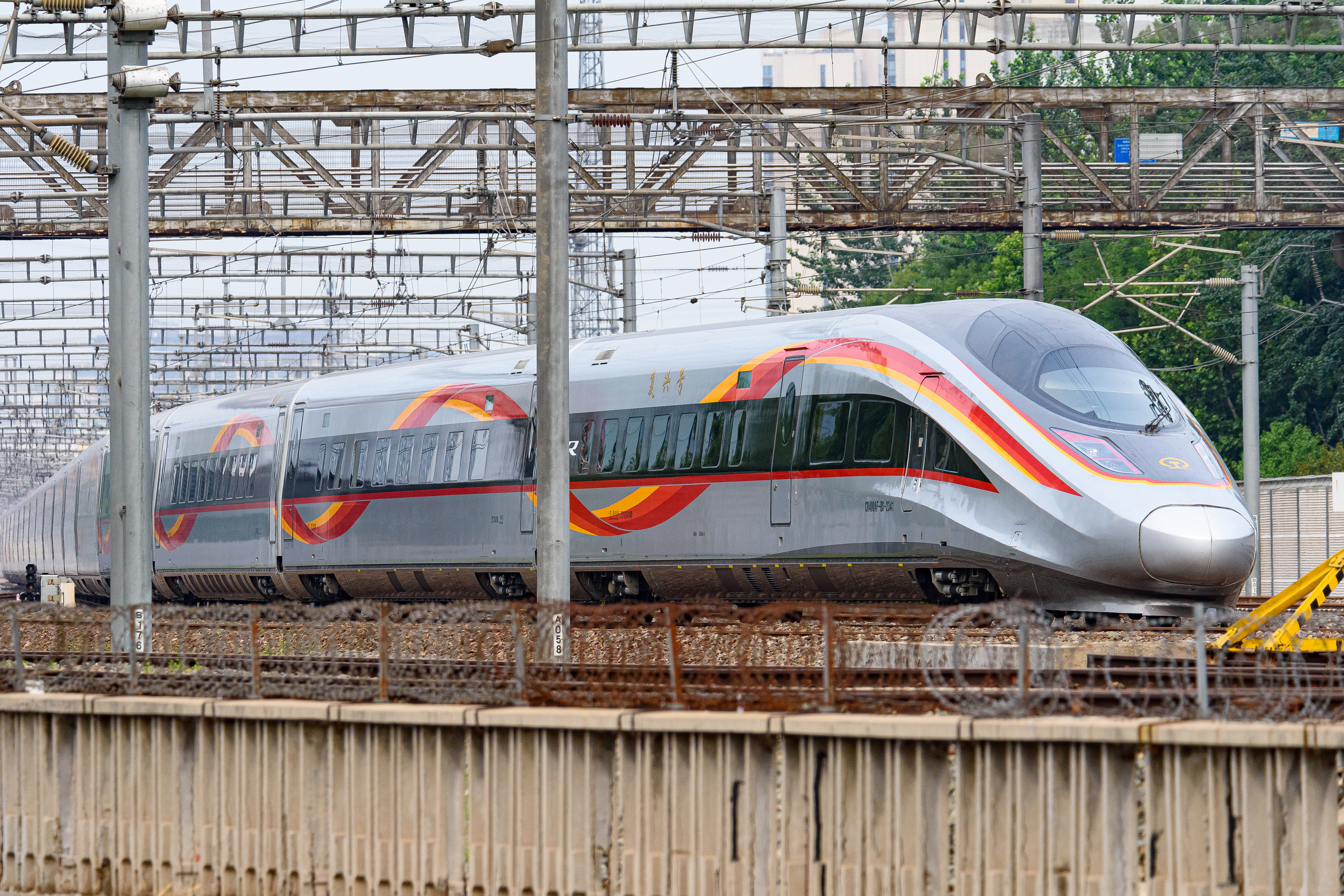
A CR400AF-BS operating train G111 departs Beijing South railway station.

G-series trains (simplified Chinese: 高速动车组旅客列车; traditional Chinese: 高速動車組旅客列車; pinyin: gāosù dòngchēzǔ lǚkè lièchē; lit. 'high-speed EMU passenger trains'), commonly called G trains, are a class of high-speed passenger service operated principally by China Railway. The designation describes a service class rather than a single type of train: G services have been worked by several generations of electric multiple unit (EMU), including Hexie and Fuxing trainsets.

China Railway uses the prefixes G, D and C to distinguish high-speed EMU, EMU and intercity EMU services, respectively. A G-series train number consists of the letter G followed by up to four numerals. In official railway announcements, the letter is read as gāo (高, “high”).

== Service characteristics ==
G-series trains generally link major cities over China's high-speed rail network. On the fastest sections, services operate at up to 350 km/h (220 mph). The National Railway Administration defines Chinese high-speed railway as standard-gauge, passenger-dedicated railway designed for 250 to 350 km/h (160 to 220 mph), with design-speed tiers of 250, 300 and 350 km/h.

The G prefix does not mean that a train runs at the same speed throughout its journey. China Railway has stated that a through service using sections limited to 300, 250 and even 200 km/h may retain a single G-series number, while its fare is calculated separately for each section. Some high-speed services also continue over connecting conventional lines to reach established city-centre stations, a practice made possible by the technical compatibility between China's high-speed and conventional networks.

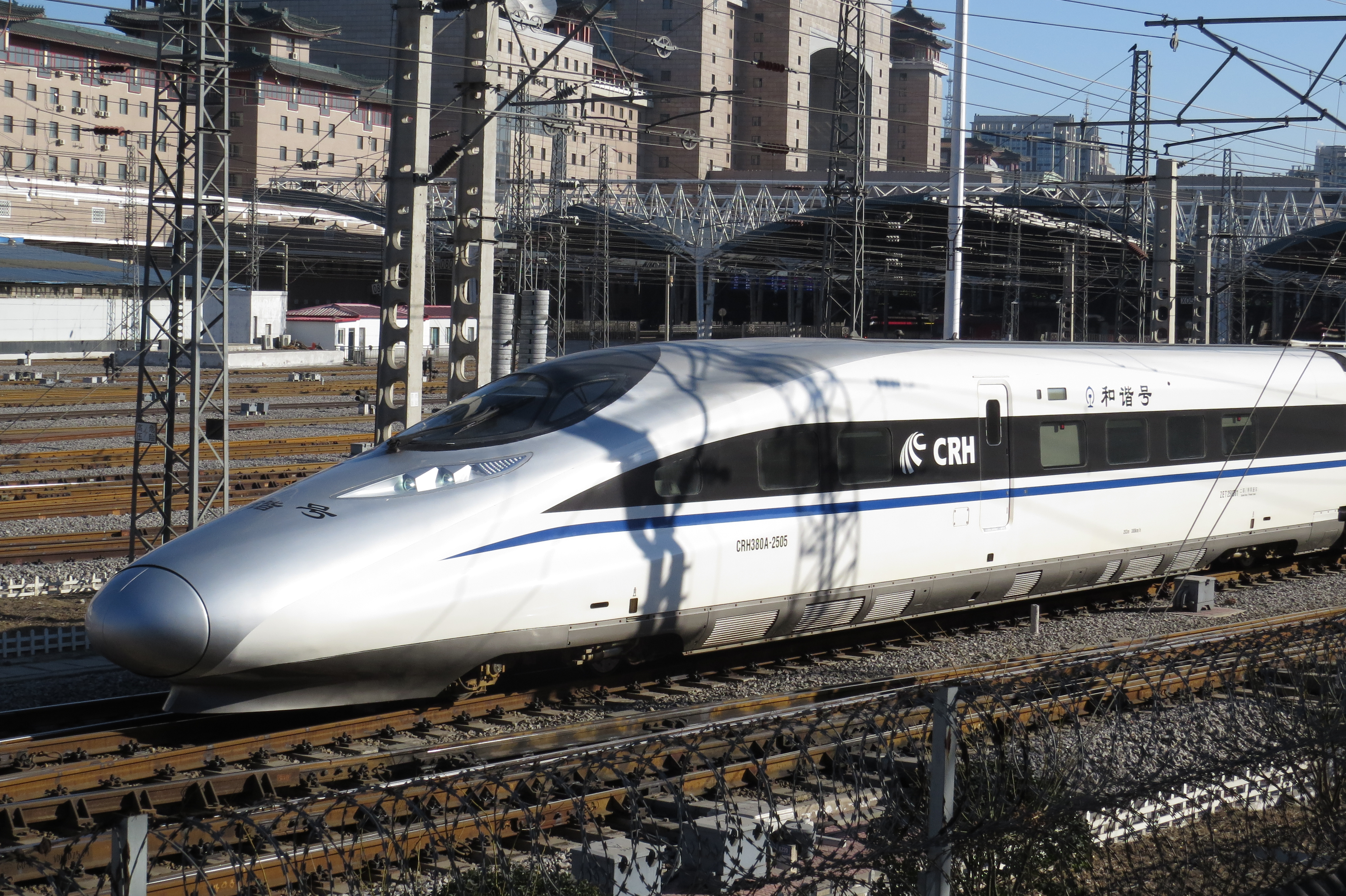
Train G6701 bound for Shijiazhuang in January 2016

Cross-boundary G services operate to and from Hong Kong West Kowloon railway station. The 26 km (16 mi) Hong Kong section opened on 23 September 2018 and is limited to 200 km/h (120 mph), while services may reach 350 km/h on mainland sections. Short-haul services on the Guangzhou–Shenzhen–Hong Kong Express Rail Link are operated by both mainland trainsets and MTR's Vibrant Express fleet; long-haul trains are operated by mainland railway companies. MTR's nine Vibrant Express sets are based on the CRH380A design.

== History ==
The modern G-series service class entered passenger use with the opening of the Wuhan–Guangzhou high-speed railway on 26 December 2009. The inaugural services included train G1001 from Wuhan to Guangzhou North. Contemporary reports described a journey time of about three hours and a maximum operating speed of 350 km/h, compared with more than ten hours on the existing railway.

The initial Wuhan–Guangzhou fleet comprised coupled CRH2C and CRH3C trainsets. The CRH380 family subsequently became a principal type on the high-speed network; in 2014, the National Railway Administration described the 350 km/h CRH380 series as the country's main high-speed rolling stock.

The first CR400 Fuxing services began on the Beijing–Shanghai high-speed railway on 26 June 2017, with CR400AF and CR400BF trainsets assigned to G123 and G124. Later CR400 variants continue to operate G services at up to 350 km/h.

== Rolling stock ==
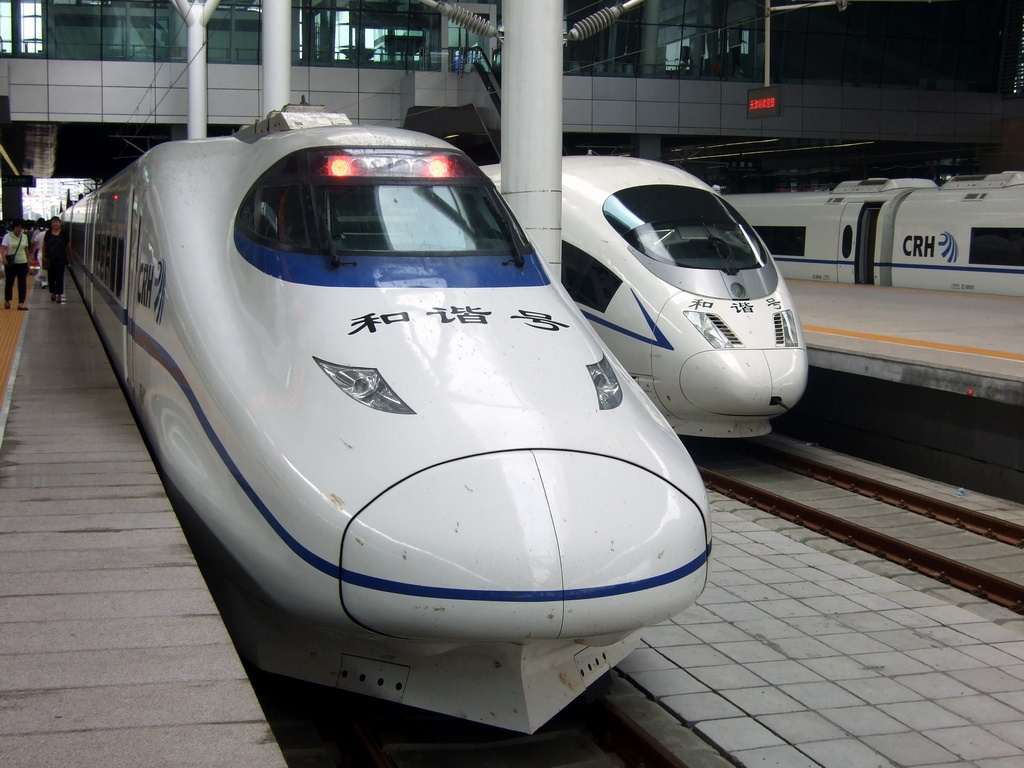
A CRH2C (left) and CRH3C (right) in 2008

The principal train families used on G-series services have included:

- CRH2C
- CRH3C
- CRH380 series
- Vibrant Express (on MTR-operated services to and from Hong Kong West Kowloon)
- CR400 Fuxing series, including the CR400AF and CR400BF families

The next-generation CR450 remains under development and is not regular G-series revenue stock. In March 2026, China State Railway Group said that two prototypes had completed type testing and 300,000 km (190,000 mi) of operational assessment, and that design finalisation was planned during 2026.

== See also ==
- High-speed rail in China
- China Railway High-speed
- D-series trains
