= Vibrant Express =

Hong Kong high-speed train

Vibrant Express 港鐵動感號

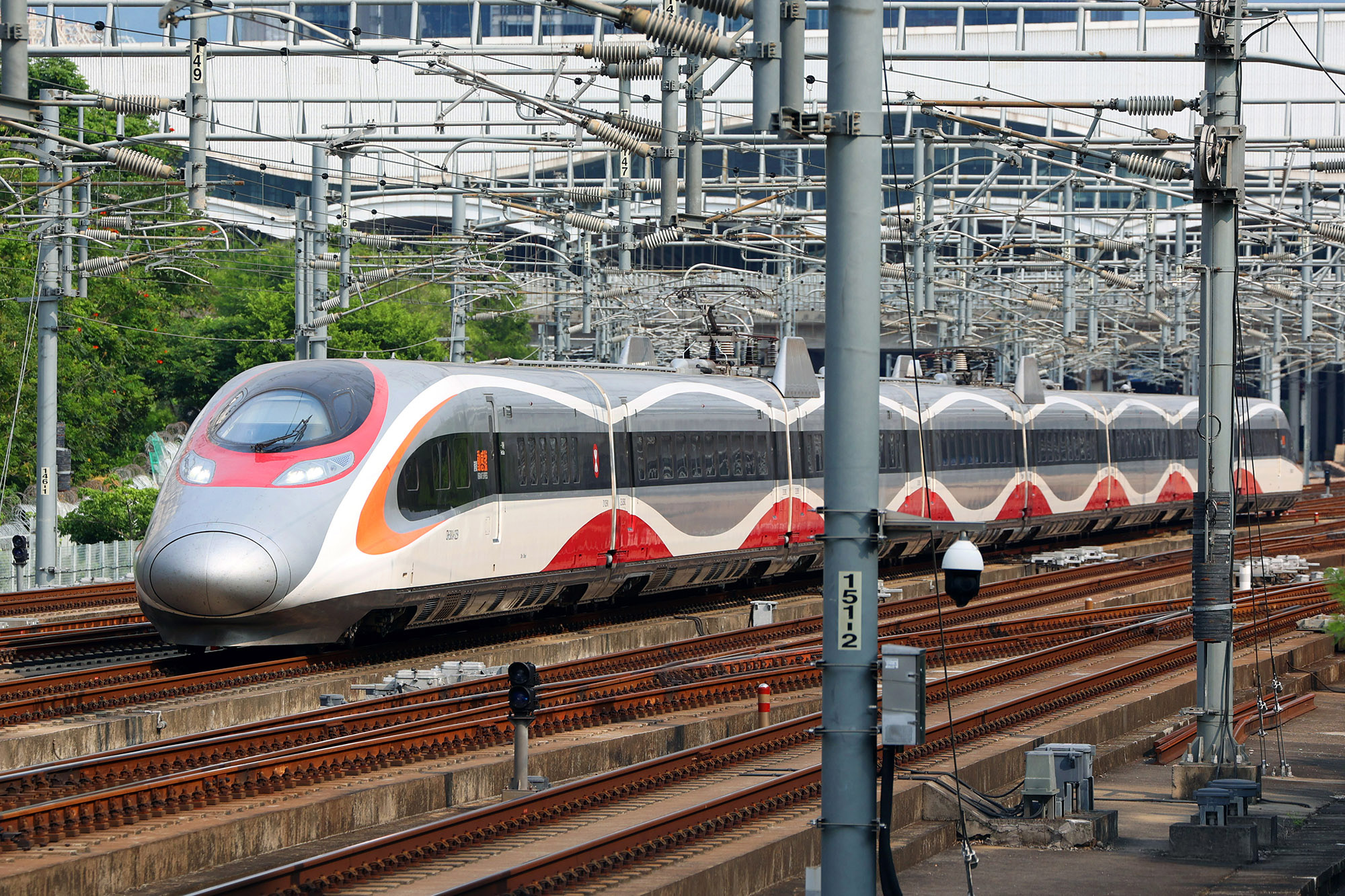
- MTR CRH380A-0251
- Manufacturer: CSR Qingdao Sifang (later CRRC Qingdao Sifang)
- Designer: MBD Design
- Order no.: 840, C6014-14E
- Built at: Qingdao, Shandong, China
- Family name: CRH380A
- Constructed: 2013–2017
- Entered service: 23 September 2018; 8 years ago
- Number built: 9 sets (72 carriages)
- Formation: 8-car sets ZY–ZE–ZE–ZE–ZE–ZE–ZE–ZY
- Fleet numbers: 0251-0259
- Capacity: 581 (2 wheelchairs, 68 first class, 511 second class)
- Operator: MTR
- Depot: Shek Kong Stabling Sidings
- Line served: Guangzhou–Shenzhen–Hong Kong XRL

Specifications
- Car body construction: Aluminium alloy (car body); Fibreglass (head-tip)
- Train length: 203 m (666 ft 0.1 in)
- Car length: 26.5 m (86 ft 11.3 in) (end cars); 25 m (82 ft 0.3 in) (intermediate cars)
- Width: 3.38 m (11 ft 1.1 in)
- Height: 3.7 m (12 ft 1.7 in)
- Floor height: 1.3 m (4 ft 3.2 in)
- Platform height: 1.25 m (4 ft 1.2 in)
- Entry: Level
- Doors: 2 per side per car
- Wheelbase: 2,500 mm (8 ft 2.4 in)
- Maximum speed: 200 km/h (124 mph) (West Kowloon to Shenzhen North); 300 km/h (186 mph) (Shenzhen North to Guangzhou South); 350 km/h (217 mph) (Operational); 380 km/h (236 mph) (Design)
- Weight: 408 t (401.6 long tons; 449.7 short tons)
- Traction system: Zhuzhou CSR Times Electric TGA10D water-cooled 3-level IGBT–VVVF converter/inverter control
- Traction motors: 24 × CSR Zhuzhou Electric YQ-365 400 kW (536 hp) outer fan-cooled 3-phase AC induction motor
- Power output: 8.76 MW (11,747 hp) (at all wheels); 9.6 MW (12,874 hp) (at all motors)
- Transmission: Twin-Disc (TD) drive
- Acceleration: 0.4 m/s^{2} (1.3 ft/s^{2})
- Power supply: AC-DC-AC
- Electric system: 25 kV 50 Hz AC Overhead catenary
- Current collection: DSA 350 pantograph
- UIC classification: 2′2′+Bo′Bo′+Bo′Bo′+Bo′Bo′+Bo′Bo′+Bo′Bo′+Bo′Bo′+2′2′
- Bogies: CSR Qingdao Sifang bolsterless bogies with air suspension (powered: SWMB-400, trailer: SWTB-400)
- Braking systems: Electropneumatic and regenerative
- Safety system: Chinese Train Control System (CTCS) Level 3
- Coupling system: Tightlock coupling
- Seating: Transverse
- Track gauge: 1,435 mm (4 ft 8 1/2 in) standard gauge

Vibrant Express
- Traditional Chinese: 動感號
- Simplified Chinese: 动感号
Transcriptions
Standard Mandarin
- Hanyu Pinyin: Dònggǎn Háo
- IPA: [tʊ̂ŋ.kàn xàʊ]
Yue: Cantonese
- Jyutping: dung^{6}gam^{2} hou^{6}
- IPA: [tʊŋ˨.kɐm˧˥ hɔw˨]

Vibrant Express (Chinese: 動感號) is a high-speed train operated by Hong Kong government-owned public transport operator MTR. It was manufactured by Chinese state-owned manufacturer CSR Qingdao Sifang (merged into CRRC Qingdao Sifang during production) based on the CRH380A Hexie EMUs developed for China Railway. Nine 8-car trainsets were ordered by the Hong Kong government through the MTR Corporation and delivered between 2016 and 2017.

The train runs between West Kowloon station and Guangzhou South station on the Guangzhou–Shenzhen–Hong Kong Express Rail Link.

== Overview ==
Vibrant Express is based on the CRH380A electric multiple units (EMUs) high-speed trains designed and manufactured by CSR.

In April 2011, MTR announced a selective invitation to tender (Contract 840) for the procurement of rolling stock to operate on the Guangzhou-Shenzhen-Hong Kong Express Rail Link (XRL) based on the requirements of having nine 8-car trainsets and the maximum operational speed of 350 km/h (217 mph). MTR's procurement team, after assessing the tender's qualifications announced in March 2012 that CSR Qingdao Sifang had been awarded with the contract worth HK$1.74 billion.

The first train arrived in Hong Kong on 26 September 2016 at River Trade Terminal, Tuen Mun District, where it was then delivered to Shek Kong Stabling Sidings and Emergency Rescue station.

On 23 September 2018, West Kowloon station and the Hong Kong section of the XRL began commercial operations. MTR-0252 brought the first passengers (including reporters) from West Kowloon station to Shenzhen North station.

Due to the COVID-19 pandemic, the Hong Kong government suspended all high-speed rail services from 30 January 2020. The service reopened on 8 January 2023.

== Technical features ==
Two different materials were used for the body of the train cars: aluminium alloy and fibre-reinforced plastics (FRP). Aluminium alloy was chosen for use on most of the body due to its low weight and high strength so safe high-speed performance could be achieved. For the nose cone, FRP was used because of its ability to be molded into complex aerodynamic shapes necessary sustained at the front of the train in high-speed operations and continue to maintain its structural strength. However, the use of these two materials with different coefficients of linear thermal expansion meant the different rates of expansion could lead to paint peeling off the body. This problem was addressed by using two separate gasket rings on the nose cone to separate it into different sections which are painted independently. They can be distinguished from CRH380A trains operated by China Railway which only have 1 gasket ring.

- Further improvement on collision and fire resistance as well as electromagnetic compatibility and other properties.
- Improved low-resistance shape.
- The optimisation of the bogie design and improvement of the interior structure.
- High-strength air tightness: to further enhance the airtight performance, the fully sealed pressurisation of differential pressure control mode is adopted. The rate of pressure change does not exceed 0.2-kilopascal-per-second [kPa/s] (0.029 psi/s).
- Improved bogie.
- Noise control: Using a variety of new noise absorption materials and noise barrier technology, EMU speed of 350 km/h (217 mph) inside noise keep in 67–69 dB level.
- The axle load still maintained at a level of 15 tonnes (16.5 short tons), under vehicle weight gained by enhancing traction power, structural quality and noise reduction level.
- High-efficiency regenerative braking.
- Ergonomic passenger interface.
- Label text (including fleet number and seat class name) on car body is painted with MTR typefaces, including MTR Sung (港鐵宋) for Chinese characters (both Traditional and Simplified, of which Simplified Chinese is a first for Hong Kong) and Myriad MM for alphanumeric characters.

== Classes ==
The Vibrant Express uses the same naming convention for travel classes as those used by G-series (High Speed) trains, the fastest train services operated by China Railway.

The trains have two classes of seats, second/standard class and first class. However, unlike the closely related CRH380A trainsets operated by China Railway, the Vibrant Express does not offer higher-end premium and business class seating or have buffet cars. This is because the Vibrant Express are short-haul trains that service only between Guangzhou South and West Kowloon.

Free Wi-Fi is provided to all passengers. Every car has baggage racks located above the seats and multi-standard power sockets. All seats are reclining and include a foldable seat table. Two wheelchair spaces are located on the seventh of the train. Foot Rests are available in First Class.

There are 511 second class seats located in the six intermediate carriages of the train. The second class coaches use 3-2 seat configuration with a mixture of orange, grey and red seats. Coat hooks are available on the sides of every row (next to the windows).

68 first class seats are in a 2-2 configuration and are located on the two end cars of the train. The class feature floral patterns in silver grey and rose red on the seats as well as the floor and walls. Each seat is provided with a reading light an on-board audio and TV entertainment system with a headphone jack. TVs are located at the center and ends of the coach. Coat hooks are featured on the side of every row (next to the window) and the back of every aisle seat. In general. first class tickets are 50-60% more expensive than second class tickets.

== Formation ==
=== Formation Nomenclature ===
The numbering and classification system of Vibrant Express train cars is based on the one used for CRH380A trains operated by China Railway.

Power Designation

- M: Motor car
- T: Trailer car
- C: Driver cabin
- P: Pantograph car

Coach Types

- ZE: Second/standard class (二等座車, Pinyin: Èr Děng Zuò Chē)
- ZY: First class (一等座車, Pinyin: Yī Děng Zuò Chē)

Set numbers

Set numbers are composed of the rolling stock type followed by the fleet number. They are displayed on the sides of the end cars. All Vibrant Express trains are part of the CRH380A family.

Carriage Number

- First 4 digits: Fleet number (0251-0259)
  - 0253XX: Fleet no. 0253
- 5th and 6th digits: Car number (01-07 and 00)
  - XXXX05 = Car no. 5
  - XXXX00 = Car no. 8

=== Formation method ===
Carriage number	1	2	3	4	5	6	7	8
Set numbers (Note: The set number is displayed on the sides of the end cars.)	CRH380A-025x							
Coach Type	First class	Second/standard class						First class
Carriage numbers	ZY 025x01	ZE 025x02	ZE 025x03	ZE 025x04	ZE 025x05	ZE 025x06	ZE 025x07	ZY 025x00
Power Configuration	Tc	M	Mp	M	Mp	M		Tc
Capacity	32	91	86	91	86	91	68 (including 2 wheelchairs)	36
Power unit no.	1			2		3		

== Distribution ==
As of August 2022

Operator	Quantity	Fleet numbers	Depot	Lines served
CRH380A
MTR Corporation	9	0251-0259	Shek Kong Stabling Sidings	Guangzhou–Shenzhen–Hong Kong Express Rail Link

== MTR order information ==
Contract reference No. 840
Information	Up to date
Title or Scope	Express Rail Link: Rolling Stock
Anticipated Date of Prequalification Invitation	Completed
Anticipated Date of Prequalification Submission or Category of Work in Approved List	Completed
Anticipated Date for Invitation to Tender	Completed
Anticipated Date of Contract Award	Completed
Tendering Procedure	Selective
Covered by WTO GPA (Y/N)	Y
Estimated Range of Cost / Awarded Value	M5
Total Amount	HK$1,744,017,141

== Gallery ==
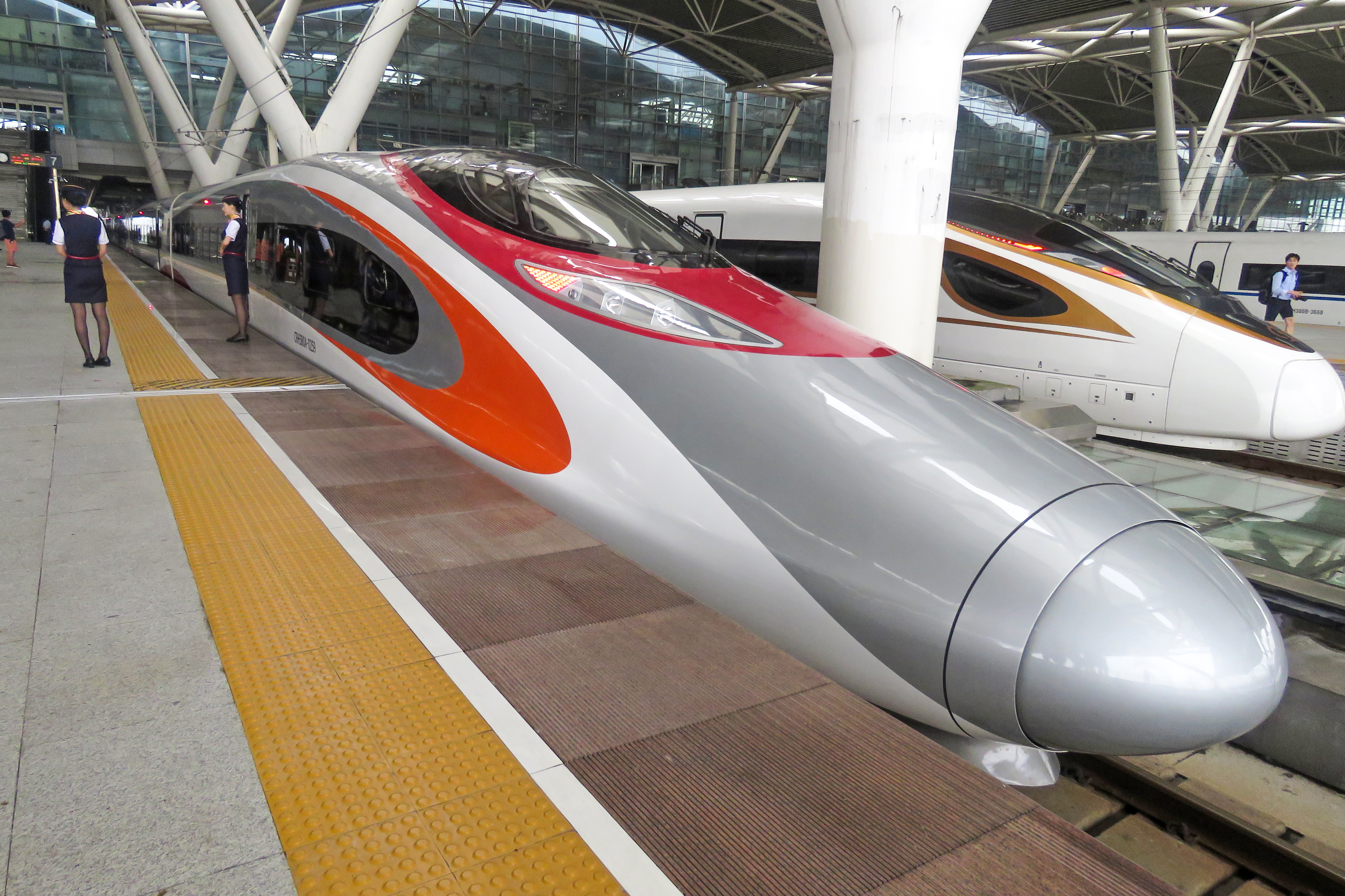
A Vibrant Express train at Guangzhou South railway station

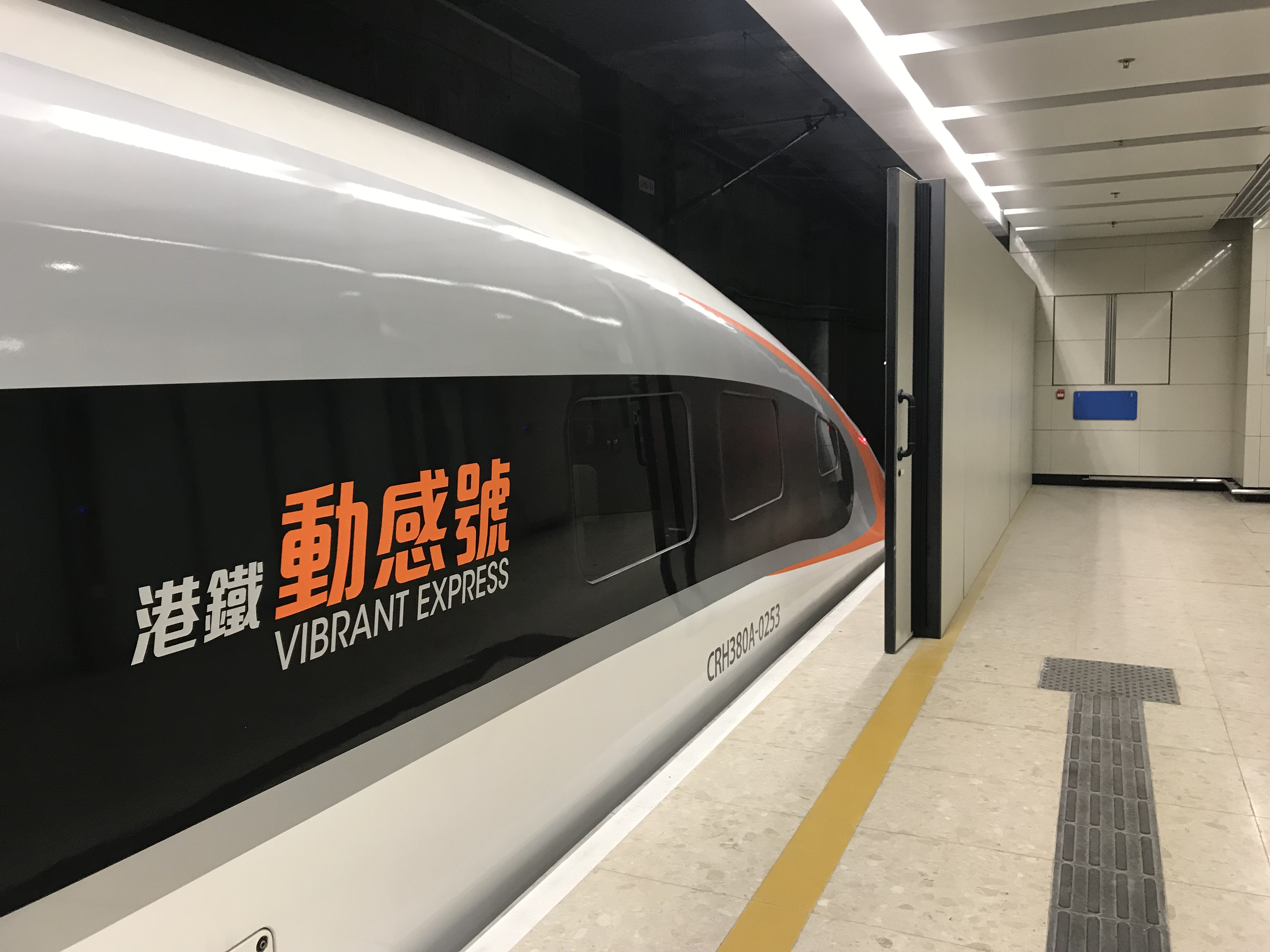
Vibrant Express at Hong Kong West Kowloon railway station

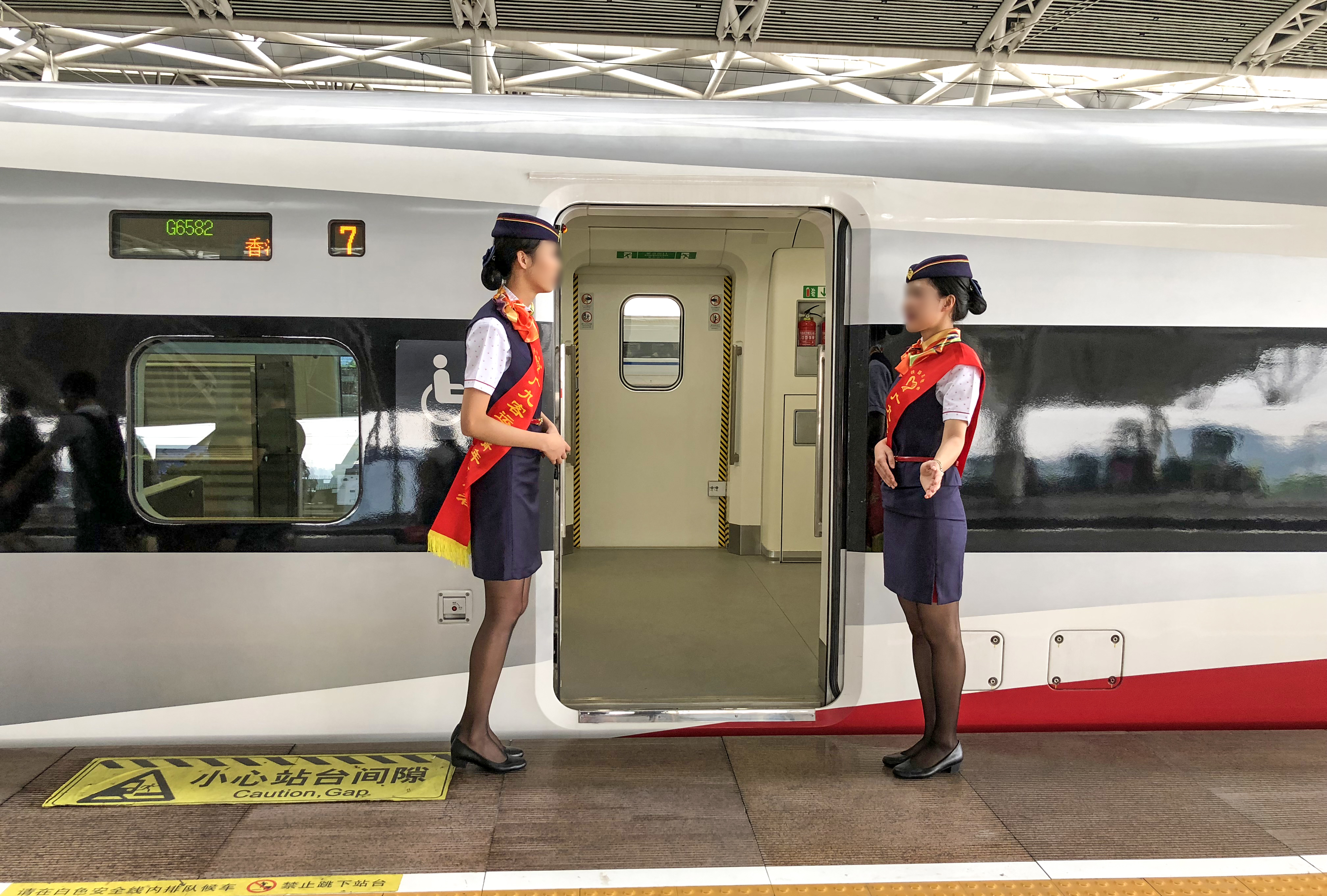
Vibrant Express G6582 at Guangzhou South station

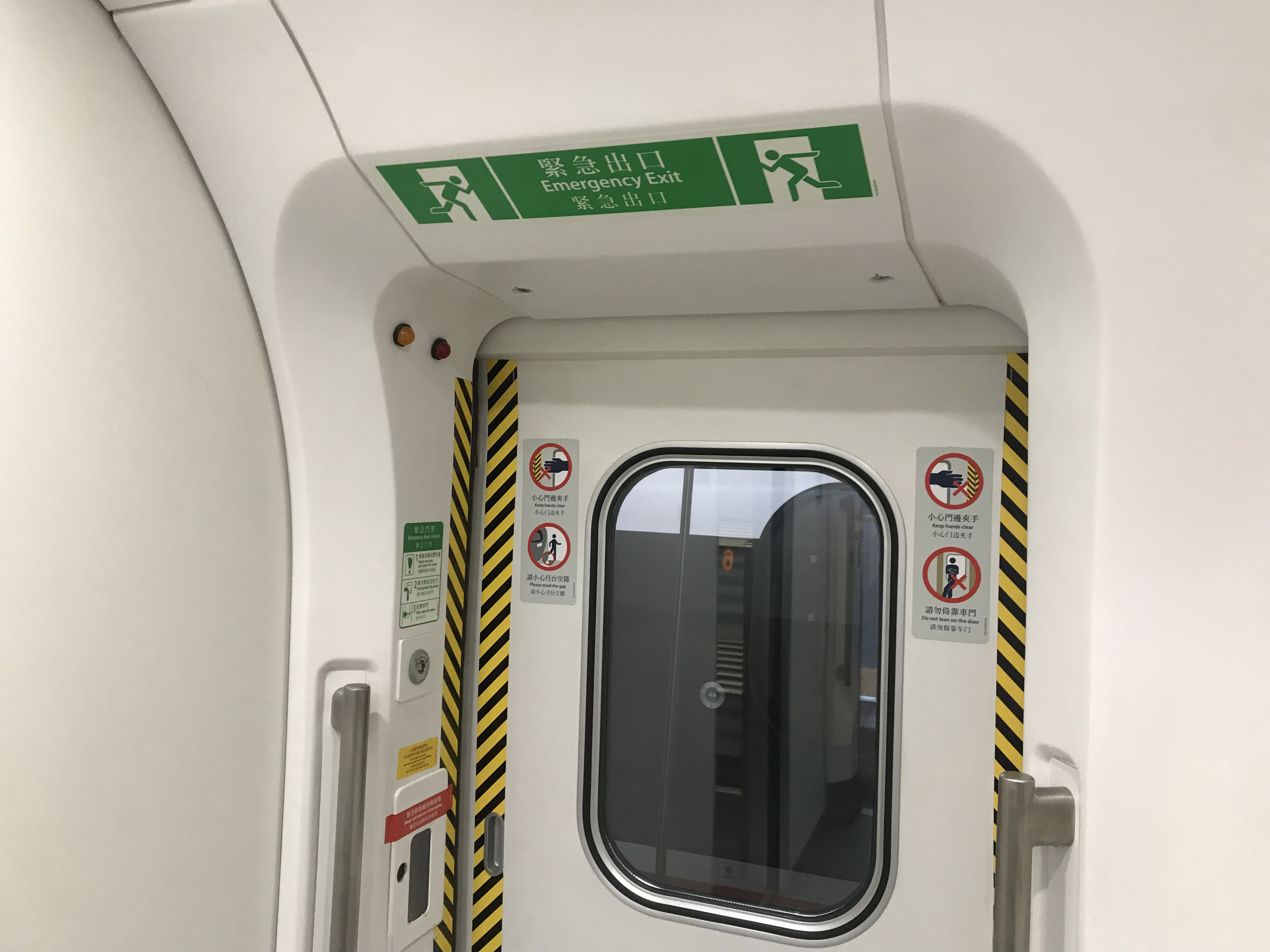
Exit door of the Vibrant Express

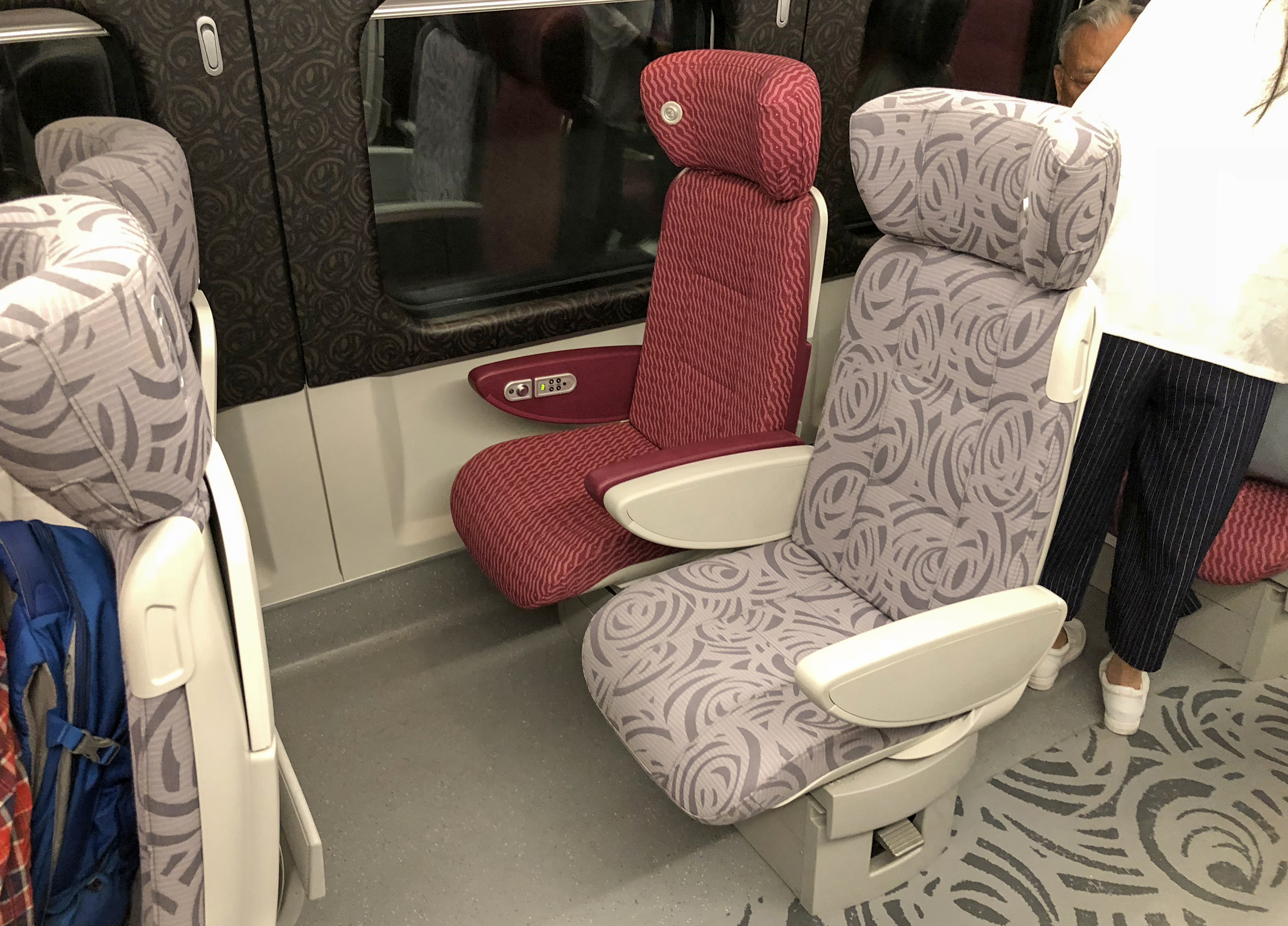
First Class Coach

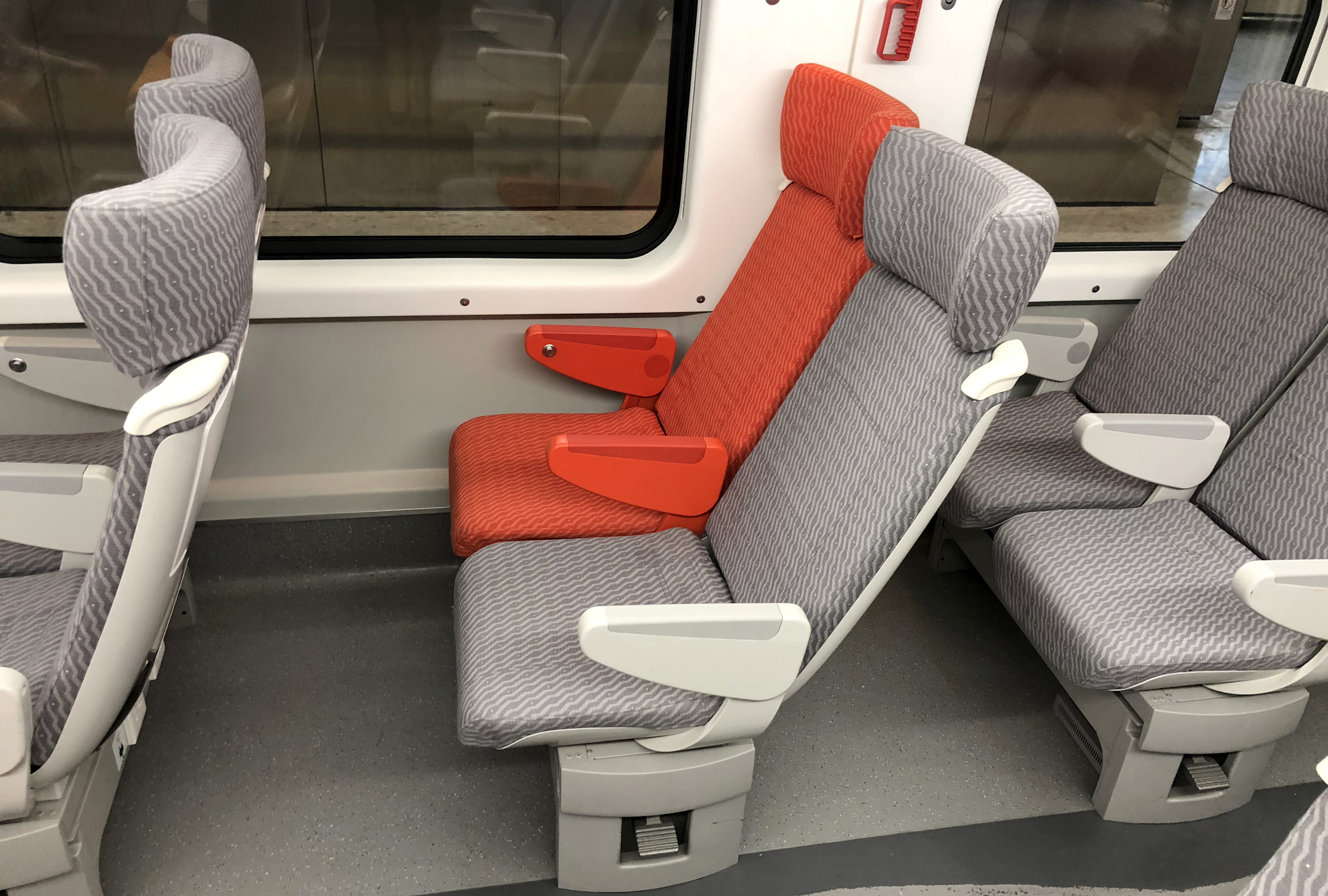
Second Class Coach

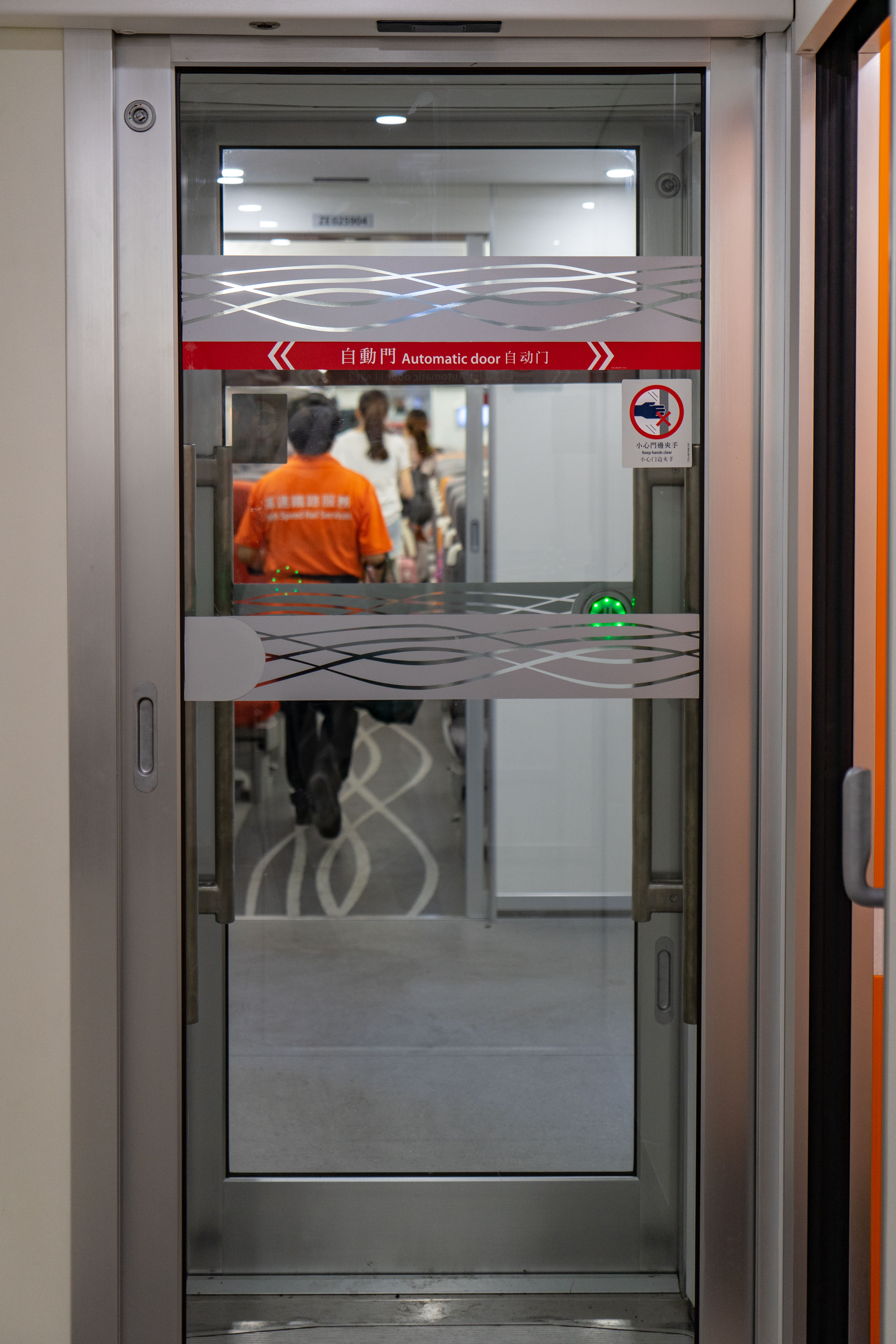
Connecting doors on Vibrant Express

== See also ==
- Hexie (train)
- China Railway CRH380A
- High-speed rail in China
- List of high-speed trains
