= Hong Kong Express Rail Link =

Express Rail Link in Hong Kong

Guangzhou–Shenzhen–Hong Kong Express Rail Link Hong Kong section 廣深港高速鐵路香港段

Overview
- Owner: Kowloon-Canton Railway Corporation (Government of the Hong Kong Special Administrative Region)
- Locale: Kowloon and New Territories, Hong Kong
- Stations: 1
- Color on map: (#BBB0A3)
- Website: Official website

Service
- Type: higher-speed rail
- Operator: MTR Corporation

History
- Opened: 23 September 2018

Technical
- Line length: 26 km (16 mi)
- Track gauge: 1,435 mm (4 ft 8 1/2 in) standard gauge
- Electrification: 25 kV 50 Hz AC (Overhead lines)
- Operating speed: 200 km/h (120 mph)

Chinese name
- Traditional Chinese: 廣深港高速鐵路香港段
- Simplified Chinese: 广深港高速铁路香港段
Transcriptions
Standard Mandarin
- Hanyu Pinyin: Guǎng–Shēn–Gǎng gāosù tiělù Xiānggǎng duàn
Yue: Cantonese
- Jyutping: gwong^{2}–sam^{1}–gong^{2} gou^{1}cuk^{1} tit^{3}lou^{6} hoeng^{1}gong^{2} dyun^{6}

The Hong Kong section of the Guangzhou–Shenzhen–Hong Kong Express Rail Link (sometimes abbreviated "XRL HK section") is a 26 km (16 mi) long stretch of high-speed rail that runs along a dedicated underground rail corridor linking Hong Kong to mainland China. It is one of the most expensive infrastructure undertakings in Hong Kong's history. The line connects Kowloon with the high-speed rail network of China at Futian station in the technology hub of Shenzhen, then running north towards Guangzhou. In the first quarter of 2026 this section of high speed rail has an average ridership of over 90,000 passengers a day.

The railway is the first high-speed rail link between mainland China and Hong Kong; it roughly halved travel time between Hong Kong and Guangzhou and connected Hong Kong to most major mainland Chinese cities via the country's extensive high-speed railway network. Construction began in 2011 and was hampered by construction delays and political controversy. It opened for commercial service on 23 September 2018.

Unlike the rest of Hong Kong, the passenger compartments of trains operating on the Hong Kong Express Rail Link are legally defined as part of the Mainland Port Area and subject to the laws of mainland China.

== History ==
In April 2007, the Executive Council assigned the task of planning and design of the fully underground Hong Kong section of the Guangzhou–Shenzhen–Hong Kong Express Rail Link (XRL) to the MTR Corporation Limited (MTRCL). Government projections indicate that the XRL will carry about 100,000 passengers daily in 2020 and 120,000 passengers in 2030, generating an economic benefit of HK$83 billion over the next 50 years in terms of travelling time saved. Construction costs were estimated at HK$39.5 billion (US$5 billion), giving an economic internal rate of return of about 9%. The construction cost of the Hong Kong section was covered by the Hong Kong Government. The government stated the objectives were to "reinforce Hong Kong's position as the transport hub in southern China and integrate Hong Kong into Mainland China's rapidly growing express rail network", and promote cultural tourism. It also argued that shortening the travelling time between Hong Kong and Guangzhou to just under 50 minutes—half the current journey time— would save "HK$83 billion over the next 50 years in terms of travelling time", and the creation of 5,000 jobs during construction, and 10,000 operational jobs.

=== Development ===
Hoping to be able to start construction of the Hong Kong section of the Express Rail Link (XRL) project before the end of 2009, the Executive Council approved the implementation on 20 October, paving the way for funding approval from the Finance Committee of the Legislative Council. Appropriations for the project secured approval of the Hong Kong Legislative Council on 16 January 2010.

The total distance of the Hong Kong section was planned to be 26 kilometres, most of which through tunnels. The dedicated track will enable a top speed of 200 km/h; the expected travel time from Kowloon to Shenzhen's Futian station is 14 minutes.

=== Service ===
The XRL HK Section only serves the West Kowloon Terminus. Short haul trains serve stations on the Mainland section of the Guangzhou–Shenzhen–Hong Kong Express Rail Link. The expected travel time between Guangzhou South and West Kowloon stations was estimated to be 1 hour and 18 minutes based on the first trial run, up from the previously announced 47 minutes with a total distance of 142 kilometers.

Long haul trains departing from Hong Kong will have destinations beyond the Guangzhou–Shenzhen–Hong Kong Express Rail Link. with services operating through the Wuguang High-Speed Railway and the Shiwu High-Speed Railway, or via Shenzhen North to Hangzhou and Shanghai through the Xiashen Railway and the Huhangyong Railway.

Service between Guangzhou South and Shenzhen North stations started on 26 December 2011. The extension to Futian station, originally scheduled for 2012, was delayed until on 30 December 2015 for Futian and the 3rd quarter of 2018 during the planning process for West Kowloon Terminus.

From January 2020, the line was closed owing to the COVID-19 pandemic and the border restrictions between Hong Kong and mainland China. The line did not reopen until January 2023. From June 2024, the line will be used by long-distance high-speed sleeper trains to Beijing and Shanghai.

In 2024, it was announced that the Guangzhou–Kowloon through trains operated by MTR and China Railway Guangzhou Group had been discontinued, with the General Administration of Customs stating that high-speed passenger trains have effectively met the travel needs of passengers between the mainland and Hong Kong. These intercity services had been suspended from early 2020 owing to the COVID-19 pandemic.

== List of stations ==
Station	Opened	Location
Futian	30 December 2015	Futian, Shenzhen
Hong Kong West Kowloon	23 September 2018	Tsim Sha Tsui, Hong Kong

== Controversies ==
The completion of the XRL HK section had been delayed on multiple occasions and continuously ran over budget, attracting criticisms from many Hong Kong protestors. Being part of the Chinese Rail Link network, with the start of commercial operations in the Hong Kong section, the Chinese authorities have created checkpoints both on the trains to Hong Kong and at the Hong Kong West Kowloon railway station, in a "Mainland Port Area" where Chinese criminal laws can be legally enforced for the first time in Hong Kong territory, as part of the bill passed in June 2018, which was criticized as an erosion of the one country, two systems principle.

=== Protests ===
On 29 November 2009, a demonstration of more than 1,000 people protesting against the construction of the Express Rail link gained the attention of the local media when a group of 100 people engaged in a sit-in protest in front of the government headquarters in Central. On 18 December 2009, when the funding application was debated in the Finance Committee of the Legislative Council, a demonstration of an estimated 1,000 to 2,000 people was staged around the Legislative Council Building. The debate did not end at the time when the meeting was scheduled to be ended, and the funding application was not yet voted on. A major protest followed in January 2010.

== See also ==
- Guangzhou–Kowloon through train
- East Rail line
- Kowloon–Canton Railway
