= Guangzhou–Shenzhen–Hong Kong Express Rail Link =

Railway line in China

Guangshengang XRL

Overview
- Native name: 广深港高铁 廣深港高鐵
- Status: Operational
- Owner: China Railway (mainland section); Kowloon-Canton Railway Corporation (Hong Kong section)
- Locale: South China
- Termini: Guangzhou South; Hong Kong West Kowloon
- Stations: 7
- Website: Official website

Service
- Type: High-speed rail line
- System: China Railway High-speed
- Services: Guangzhou-Hong Kong high-speed train; Shenzhen–Hong Kong high-speed train
- Operators: CR Guangzhou; MTR
- Depot(s): Guangzhou Panyu Depot Shenzhen North Depot Shek Kong Stabling Sidings and Emergency Rescue Siding

History
- Opened: 23 September 2018; 7 years ago

Technical
- Line length: 142 km (88.23 mi)
- Number of tracks: Double-track
- Character: Underground (Shenzhen North ↔ West Kowloon); Elevated (Guangzhou South ↔ Shenzhen North)
- Track gauge: 1,435 mm (4 ft 8 1/2 in) standard gauge
- Minimum radius: 5,000–7,000 m (3.1–4.3 mi; 16,000–23,000 ft) (Guangzhou South - Shenzhen North); 2,800–3,500 m (1.7–2.2 mi; 9,200–11,500 ft) (Shenzhen North - Hong Kong West Kowloon)
- Electrification: 25 kV 50 Hz AC (Overhead line)
- Operating speed: 350 km/h (217 mph) (Guangzhou South ↔ Shenzhen North); 250 km/h (155 mph) (Shiziyang Tunnel); 200 km/h (124 mph) (Shenzhen North ↔ West Kowloon)
- Signalling: CTCS Level 3 CBTC
- Maximum incline: 1.2% (Normal); 2.0% (Difficult terrain)
- Average inter-station distance: 20.3 km (12.6 mi)

Chinese name
- Simplified Chinese: 广深港高速铁路
- Traditional Chinese: 廣深港高速鐵路
Transcriptions
Standard Mandarin
- Hanyu Pinyin: Guǎng–Shēn–Gǎng Gāosù Tiělù
- Wade–Giles: Kuang-Shen-Kang Kao-su Tʻieh-lu
Yue: Cantonese
- Yale Romanization: gwóng sām góng gōu chūk tit louh
- Jyutping: Gwong2 Sam1 Gong2 Gou1 Cuk1 Tit3 Lou6

Alternative Chinese name
- Simplified Chinese: 广深港客运专线
- Traditional Chinese: 廣深港客運專線
Transcriptions
Standard Mandarin
- Hanyu Pinyin: Guǎng–Shēn–Gǎng Kèyùn Zhuān Xiàn
- Wade–Giles: Kuang-Shen-Kang Kʻo-yün Chuan-hsien
Yue: Cantonese
- Jyutping: Gwong^{2}–Sam^{1}–Gong^{2} Haak^{3}wan^{6} Zyun^{1} Sin^{3}
Route map

Route of Guangzhou–Shenzhen–Hong Kong XRL
(Guangshen section in red and
Hong Kong section in blue)

The Guangzhou–Shenzhen–Hong Kong Express Rail Link (XRL), also known as the Guangshengang XRL, is a high-speed railway line that connects Guangzhou and Hong Kong (Kowloon) via Shenzhen.

Three types of rolling stock that operate along the XRL: Hexie (Harmony) and Fuxing (Rejuvenation) operated by China Railway, and Vibrant Express (a modified version of the CRH380A) by MTR Corporation.

The first phase, Shenzhen North–Guangzhou South, commenced revenue operation in December 2011. Services were extended to the city centre of Shenzhen at Futian in December 2015. The final phase, which connects Shenzhen-Futian to Hong Kong (West Kowloon) was inaugurated on 22 September 2018. It opened for public on Sunday 23 September 2018.

== Journey times ==
- Hong Kong (West Kowloon) – Futian: 14 minutes (fastest)
- Hong Kong (West Kowloon) – Shenzhen North: 18 minutes (fastest)
- Hong Kong (West Kowloon) – Guangzhou South: 46 minutes (fastest)

== History ==
=== Background ===
The railway connecting the mainland China has been important for Hong Kong since the 20th century. After the establishment of the People's Republic of China, three railway lines from the mainland, also known as "santang kuaiche" (three cargo express trains), were arranged to transport fresh food every day to maintain the daily needs of the Hong Kong people. A high-speed railway connecting Guangzhou, Shenzhen and Hong Kong, railway was brought up in the late 1990s by the Government of Hong Kong. This Regional Express Railway (RER) proposal was developed in the 1994 "Railway Development Study" (RDS); it foresaw a continual growth of Hong Kong's population over the next two decades and strong demand for cross-border passenger traffic. The Hong Kong (SAR) Government commissioned a second Railway Development Study in March 1998. The Study went further on the British proposal of connecting Hong Kong and China from Kowloon. The RER could be further extended to Hong Kong Island. At the same time, the report recommended that Hung Hom station should continue to play a central role in Hong Kong's mass transit. Since the typical timeframe for rail projects, from conception to completion phase, would take eight or nine years, the Railway Development Study recommended that the Hong Kong (SAR) Government should commence as soon as possible, so that the new express railway could be constructed in time to meet capacity demands.

=== Maglev proposal ===
In September 1999, the then mayor of Guangzhou, Lin Shusen, announced his "Suigang maglev rail project" at the "Fortune Global Forum" in Shanghai. Lin was already working with then-Chief Executive of Hong Kong, Tung Chee-hwa, on the development of Hong Kong Disneyland. Lin proposed that a maglev railway between Guangzhou and Hong Kong would benefit visitor numbers. The cost of construction was to be borne in equal proportion by governments of both cities.

=== Railway Development Strategy 2000 ===
The Hong Kong government, based on the results of the Second Railway Development Study by the Department of Transportation, issued a new plan, "Railway Development Strategy 2000 – new railway strategy". On 16 May's Legislative Council meeting, the Legco Panel on Transport Railway Development Strategy tabled the strategy for use by the Hong Kong (SAR) Government. The Executive Council (upper house) recommended that, under the Chief Executive's advice, Hong Kong should adopt the "Railway Development Strategy 2000" until a further review in 2016.

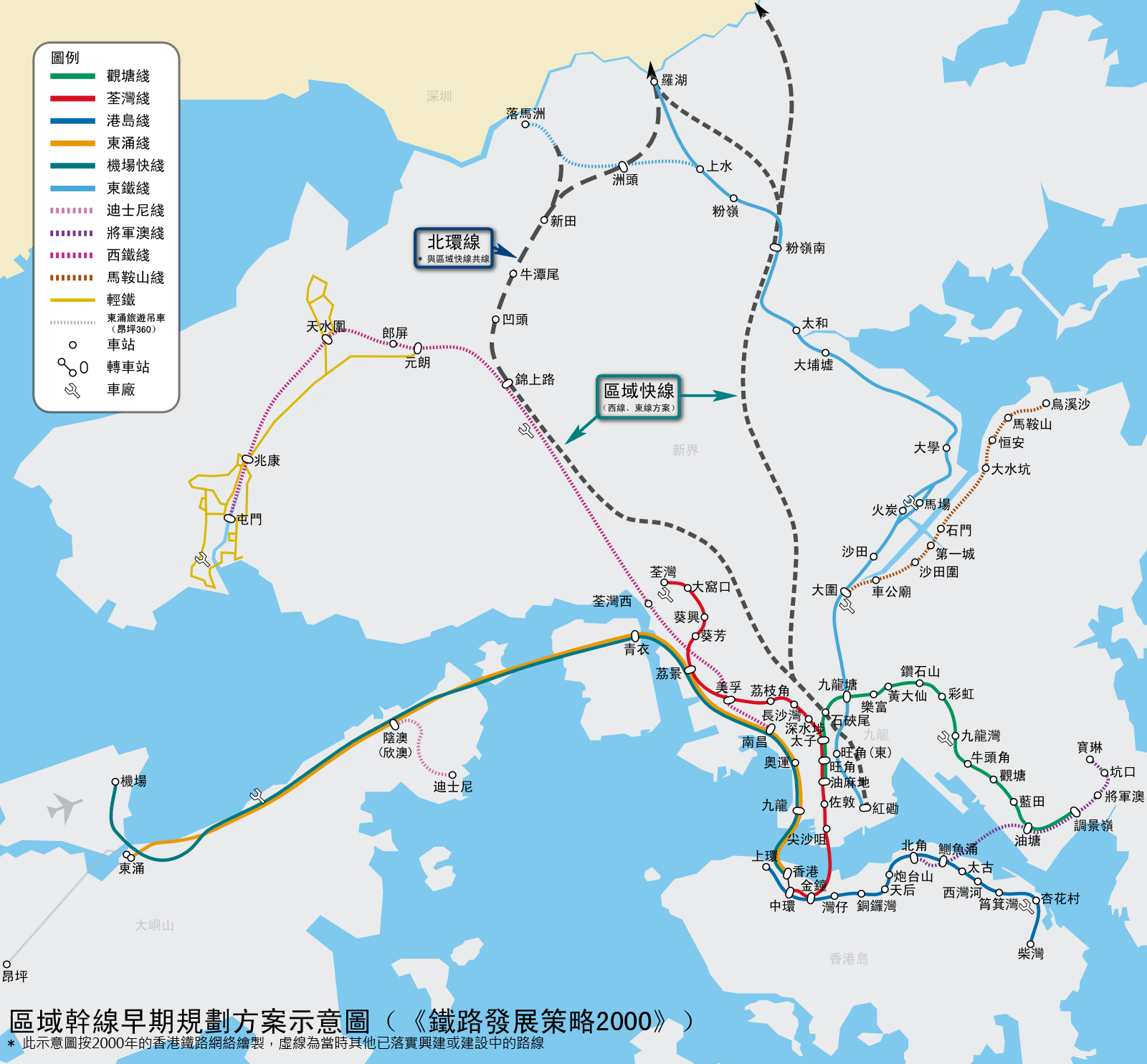
Proposed options for Regional Express Railway

=== Regional Express Railway ===
"Railway Development Strategy 2000” recommended six new rail corridors, through the New Territories, connecting the East Rail or the West Rail line to the border, operating between Hung Hom and the border in an express manner similar to Hong Kong Airport's Airport Express line. " The decision to build a "Regional Express", depended on the Lok Ma Chau Spur provided additional transport capacity which would soon be saturated. According to the 1998 price estimates, construction of the RER needed a budget of about HK$130 to 170 billion. It was intended that this railway would be operated by the Kowloon-Canton Railway Corporation or the Mass Transit Railway Corporation, depending on the location of the downtown terminal.

At that time about the "Regional Express" concept, was not a high-speed rail, but only a commuter line connecting the city and the border with "rapid rail" services, in addition to the idea of a small number of intermediate stations being set up alongside the route, but also allowing for Hong Kong and China Intercity trains to run, reducing the load on the existing East Rail line. At that time the initial alignment program has two starting points located around Hung Hom station. The first one was the Eastern scheme, a new line following the East Rail line of pink Lingnan station, connecting to Lo Wu station or a new rail crossings in the east of Luohu. However, this proposal needed to co-operation with the mainland. The second program for a new line from the West Rail line at Kam Sheung Road station, northwards to Lo Wu or Lok Ma Chau station.

Since 2001, the Hong Kong government began working on the "Regional Express" with mainland China, and discussing the feasibility of cooperation on "Suigang maglev rail project". In 2001, the Hong Kong DoT, with the Shenzhen Municipal Government and Chinese railway authorities to explore the use of "RER" and maglev technology, project feasibility and actively using magnetic levitation technology to build a line from Hong Kong to Canton/Guangzhou. The study pointed out that the use of a maglev train would reduce the Hong Kong to Shenzhen running time of 40 minutes to 15 minutes. September 2001, when he was the Hong Kong SAR Chief Secretary Donald Tsang, visited Canton/Guangzhou, where he met with the Governor of Guangdong Province, Lu Ruihua, acting mayor of Guangzhou, Lin Shusen and Shenzhen Mayor Yu Youjun for talks about the "Regional Express line concept". Tung attended the Shanghai APEC Summit in October 2001, formally proposing the construction of a maglev railway between Canton/Guangzhou and Hong Kong Express Line plans to the State Planning Commission. The Mayor of Shenzhen Yu Youjun said at a news conference at the APEC Senior Officials' Meeting, Shenzhen and Hong Kong is planning to build maglev railway and to continue to discuss the issue. But also at this time, the Guangzhou-Shenzhen Railway Co. also made a Guangzhou–Kowloon Through Train speed plan.

=== Switch to high-speed rail ===
By the end of January 2002, the concept of "Regional Express" gained further development. Tsang was in Beijing to attend the "Mainland and Hong Kong SAR major infrastructure coordination meeting", and with the State Development Planning Commission and the relevant ministry officials, the talks were initially on Regional Express railway line connecting Guangzhou, Shenzhen and Hong Kong, focussing on the design and coordination of consensus between the parties. The central government officially approved research and co-ordination by the Ministry of Railways, and officially named this railway the "Guangzhou–Shenzhen–Hong Kong Express Rail Link". With a formal agreement with the Hong Kong SAR Government, decided by the Ministry of Railways, led the establishment of an expert group to study the construction of the Regional Express high-speed rail line.

In February 2002, in the framework of "collaborative meetings" by the Hong Kong SAR Government Environment, Transport and Works Bureau and the Ministry of Railways, the Guangzhou–Shenzhen–Hong Kong Express Rail Link Planning Group was established, which meant the "Railway Development Strategy 2000” planned "Regional Express" was set aside for the "Guangzhou–Shenzhen–Hong Kong Express Rail Link - Hong Kong section". The planning Group conducted preliminary studies on the main railway necessity, function, alignment, location transit, rail technology and economic benefits.

The first phase of the study topics included the functional and strategic importance of the Guangzhou–Shenzhen–Hong Kong Express Rail Link project, the relevant regional passenger transport demand analysis and forecasting, as well as railway lines and public transit locations. The first phase of the study completed in September 2002 and reported on the September 20th 2002 at the Second "Mainland and Hong Kong's major infrastructure cooperation held meeting". At the meeting, the high-speed rail planning team reported the first phase of on the planning for the GZ-SZ-HK XRL. Including the necessities of GZ-SZ-HK XRL construction, function and regional transportation needs, forecasting and route traffic in order to determine the strategic value of the railway. Experts in Hong Kong and mainland China reached a consensus after comparing different alignments, shortlisting two options, "Guangzhou East – Dongguan – Lin Tong – Hong Kong" and "Panyu – Nansha – Shekou – Hong Kong". A planning goal was to reduce Guangzhou to Hong Kong travel time from 100 minutes to less than 60 minutes. In addition, effective integration with the national high-speed rail network and the connections with the planned Pearl River Delta intercity rapid rail transit network.

The second phase of the study, included rail alignments, station locations and the Hong Kong section of the Guangzhou–Shenzhen line connections, the main technical standards, passenger flow forecasting, financial benefits. During the study, in response to the latest developments of both the overall urban planning and transportation network planning, the Ministries of Railways, Environment, Transport and Works respectively needed to consider some new ideas and make adjustments for the Hong Kong section of GZ–SZ–HK XRL project. In mainland China, the Ministry of Railways had to consider the feasibility of the PRD Intercity Rapid Rail network together with the Guangzhou–Shenzhen section of GZ–SZ–HK XRL. In Hong Kong, the government began to consider the use of the proposed North West Rail Link, Northern Link and the feasibility GZ–SZ–HK XRL Hong Kong section. Kowloon-Canton Railway Corporation and the Hong Kong Mass Transit Railway Corporation produced a consolidated joint report submitted to the Government, it was a preliminary assessment of their ideas, but also required further studies by the Environment, Transport and Works Bureau & KCRC of the Northern Link.

In the first and second phases of the study, the planning team had to investigate and compare the traditional wheel-rail and maglev technologies. Operating and maintenance costs were greater with maglev than with wheel-rail technology, The construction period of the project was expected to be longer for maglev than the wheel-rail technology solutions. Maglev was not conducive to the existing rail network and compatibility. Also with current high-speed railway operating speeds of up to 350 km/h (220 mph), the less than an hour goal was able to be achieved. Thus to reach the GZ–SZ–HK XRL's three goals, there was no need to adopt a relatively high cost and the technical difficulty of maglev technology. Thus, despite the advantages that high-speed maglev technology has, until August 2003, both sides tended to choose more mature high-speed wheel-rail plans. In other words, the "Regional Express" that was originally intended to have been conceived as a maglev train was cancelled.

In March 2003, the Guangzhou Railway Group Corporation general manager, Wú Jùnguāng, at the National People's Congress, submitted a bill that called for the construction of a Guangzhou–Shenzhen–Hong Kong Express Rail Link Passenger Line as soon as possible. The Guangzhou–Shenzhen Railway utilization has exceeded 90% and was saturated. According to the existing passenger growth rate, to 2005, the Guangzhou East to Shenzhen route would require 96-151 train pairs daily, which will greatly exceed the capacity of the line. It is difficult to meet the transportation needs of the future with the new high-speed rail showing greater potential in the pipeline.

On 7 January 2004, China's State Council considered the "long-term railway network plan", deciding to build more than 12,000 kilometers of "four vertical and four horizontal" Passenger Lines, including Hong Kong in the planning. The Guangzhou–Shenzhen section of the Guangzhou–Shenzhen–Hong Kong Express Rail Link correspondingly accelerated planning until July 2004, deciding to adopt the "Panyu – Nansha – Shekou – Hong Kong" route. The station located in Guangzhou's Panyu district would also connect with the Wuhan–Guangzhou Passenger Line.

== Route ==
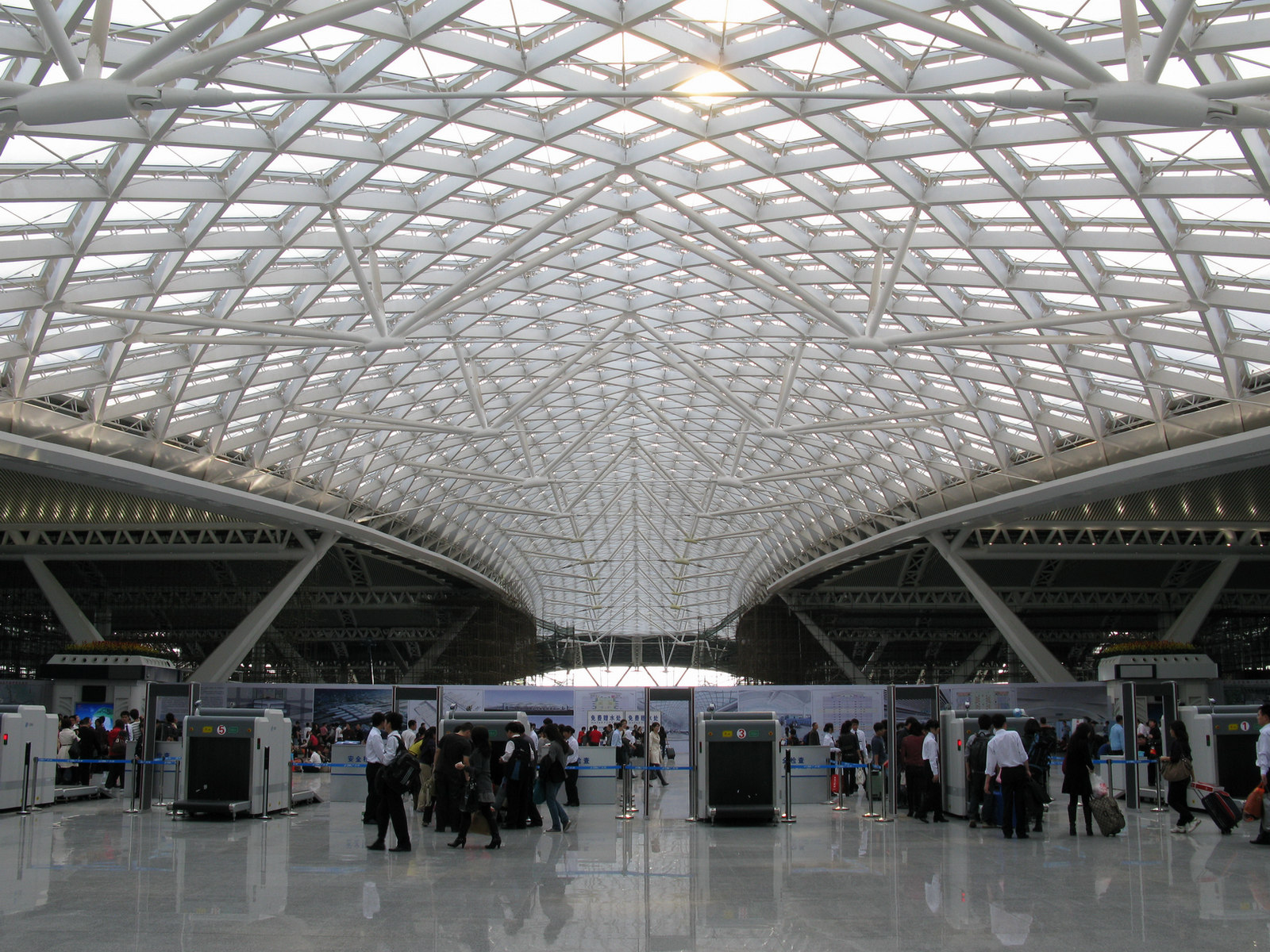
Guangzhou South railway station east concourse

The 143 km (89 mi) route starts with a connection to the Wuguang High-Speed Railway at Guangzhou South railway station in Shibi, southern Guangzhou (Canton). From there it travels south to the same district before tunnelling eastwards underneath the Pearl River to Humen in Dongguan. It then moves south through three stations within Shenzhen and then across into Hong Kong where it arrives at West Kowloon Terminus in Kowloon.

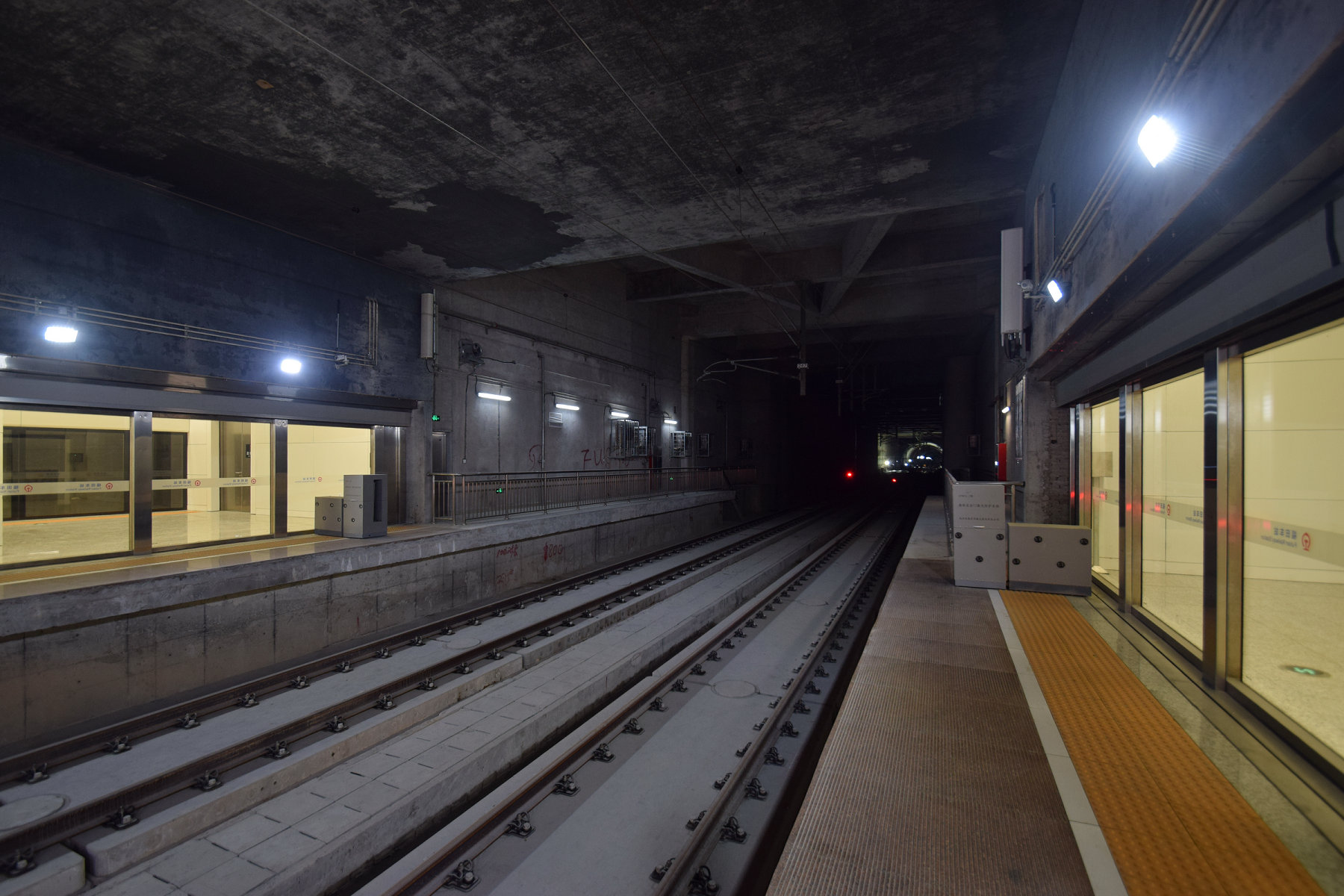
Tracks towards Hong Kong at Futian railway station

This project has been divided into two sections, the Guangshen section with six stations, and the Hong Kong section, with one station.

=== Mainland Section ===
Guangzhou–Shenzhen–Hong Kong Express Rail Link section of the Guangzhou–Shenzhen starts at Guangzhou South railway station and ends at Shenzhen Futian station, it is 116 km (72 mi) line length, with a design speed of 350 km/h (220 mph). From there it travels south to Qingsheng before tunnelling eastwards underneath the Pearl River to Humen in Dongguan. It then moves south to Guangmingcheng, Shenzhen North and Futian in Shenzhen.

Originally the station in Humen was to be named Dongguan but this was changed to Humen to avoid confusion with an existing Dongguan railway station on the Guangzhou–Shenzhen Railway in the town of Changping.

=== Hong Kong Section ===
The Hong Kong section is in total 26 km (16 mi) of dedicated underground track, emergency rescue sidings and the stabling sidings in Shek Kong, ventilation facilities at Mai Po, Ngau Tam Mei and Pat Heung, along with an emergency access point at Tai Kong Po and eventually terminating at Hong Kong West Kowloon station.

The Regional Express Line originally envisaged in the Railway Development Strategy 2000 proposed by the Hong Kong Special Administrative Region Government (HKSAR Government), has now become the Hong Kong section of the Guangzhou–Shenzhen–Hong Kong Express Rail Link (XRL). In April 2008, the HKSAR Government asked the MTR Corporation to carry out further planning and design of the Express Rail Link. Subsequently, the HKSAR Government gazetted the Scheme for the Express Rail Link under the Railways Ordinance to collect public views.

In early 2009, the government of Hong Kong signed a memorandum of understanding with the Chinese Ministry of Railways that would permit the construction of the Shenzhen–Hong Kong section of the railway.

On 20 October 2009, the Chief Executive in Council authorised the scheme and the Amendments of the Scheme of the Express Rail Link. On 16 January 2010, the Finance Committee of the Legislative Council approved the funding application for the construction of the Express Rail Link. The construction commenced in late January 2010 and was completed in September 2018. In October 2014, an MTR report warned that the revised budget of HK$71.5 billion might be at risk. This section had been expected to open in 2015, but severe storms flooded the tunnels and caused immense damage to the Tunnel Boring Machines in March 2014. The railway has been expected to be completed in third quarter of 2018. According to the Rail Merger Bill, MTR Corporation will lease the rights to conduct operations on this line, until 1 December 2057.

With the completion of the section, the journey time through the Rail Link have been reduced to 14 minutes between WKT and Futian stations, 23 minutes between Hong Kong and Shenzhen North and 48 minutes between Hong Kong and Guangzhou South. As of 2015, the cost of the project has risen substantially to HK$85.3 billion.

== Mainland Port Area ==
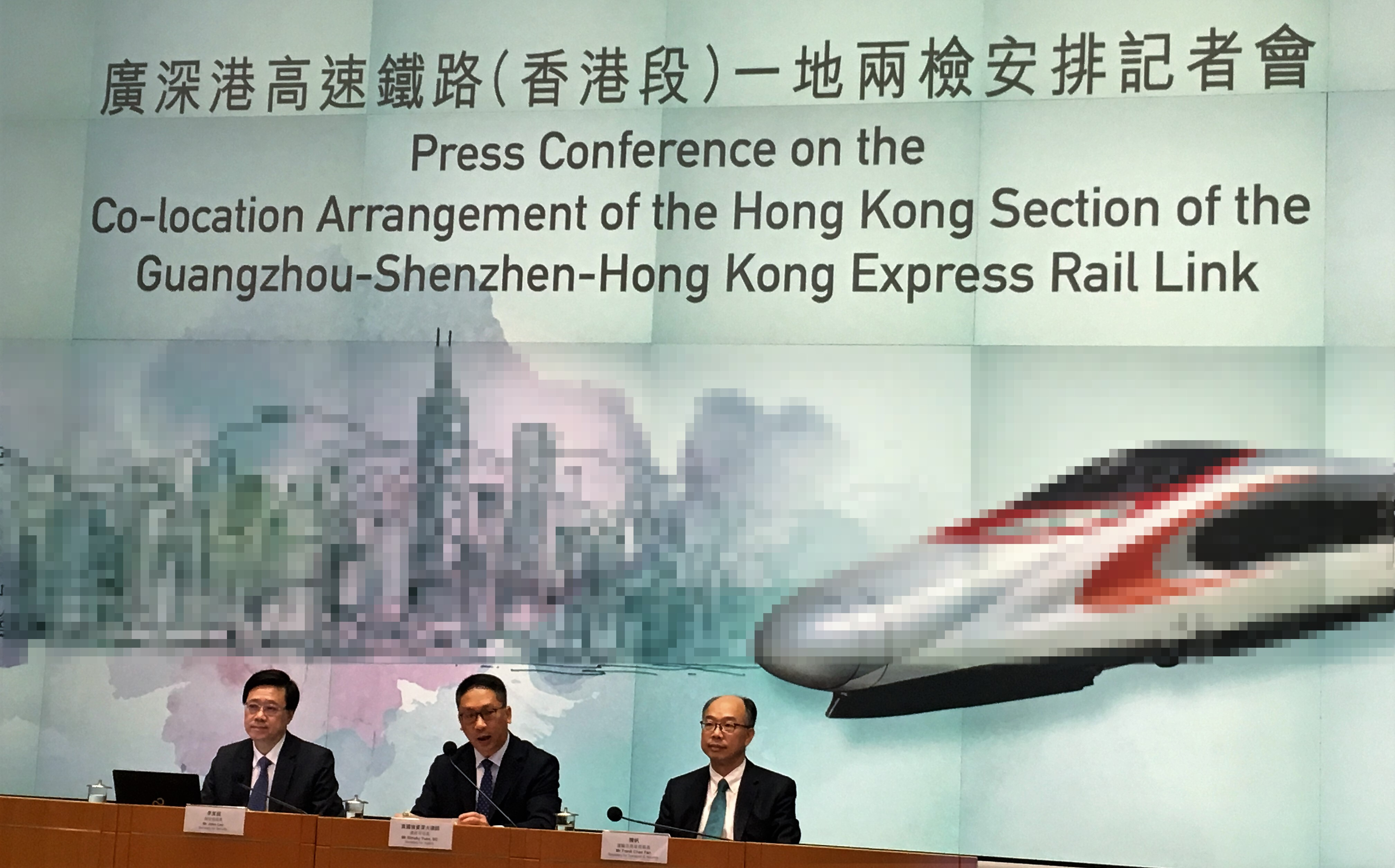
The Government announced the implementation of co-location arrangement on 25 July 2017

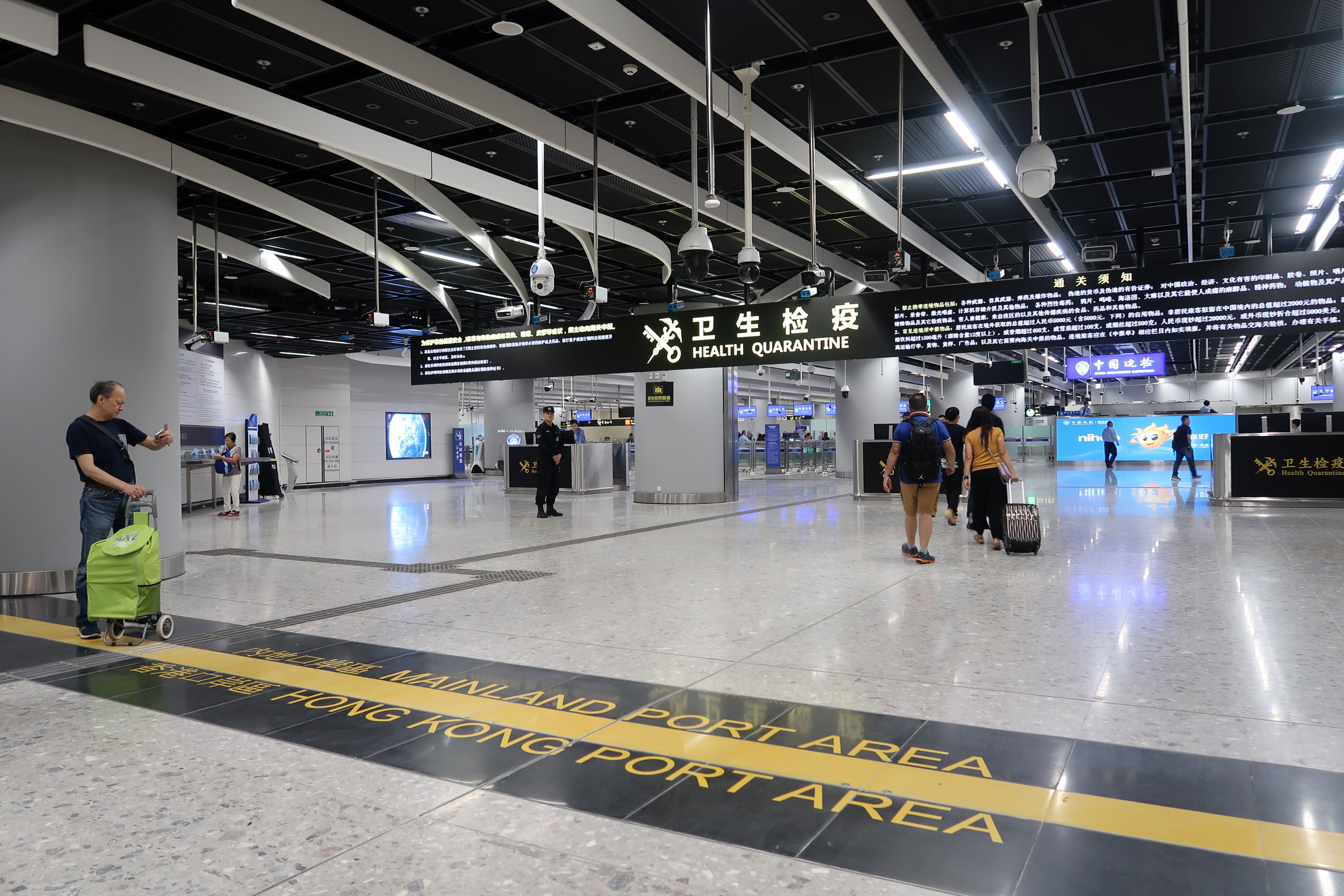
Entrance of the Mainland Port Area

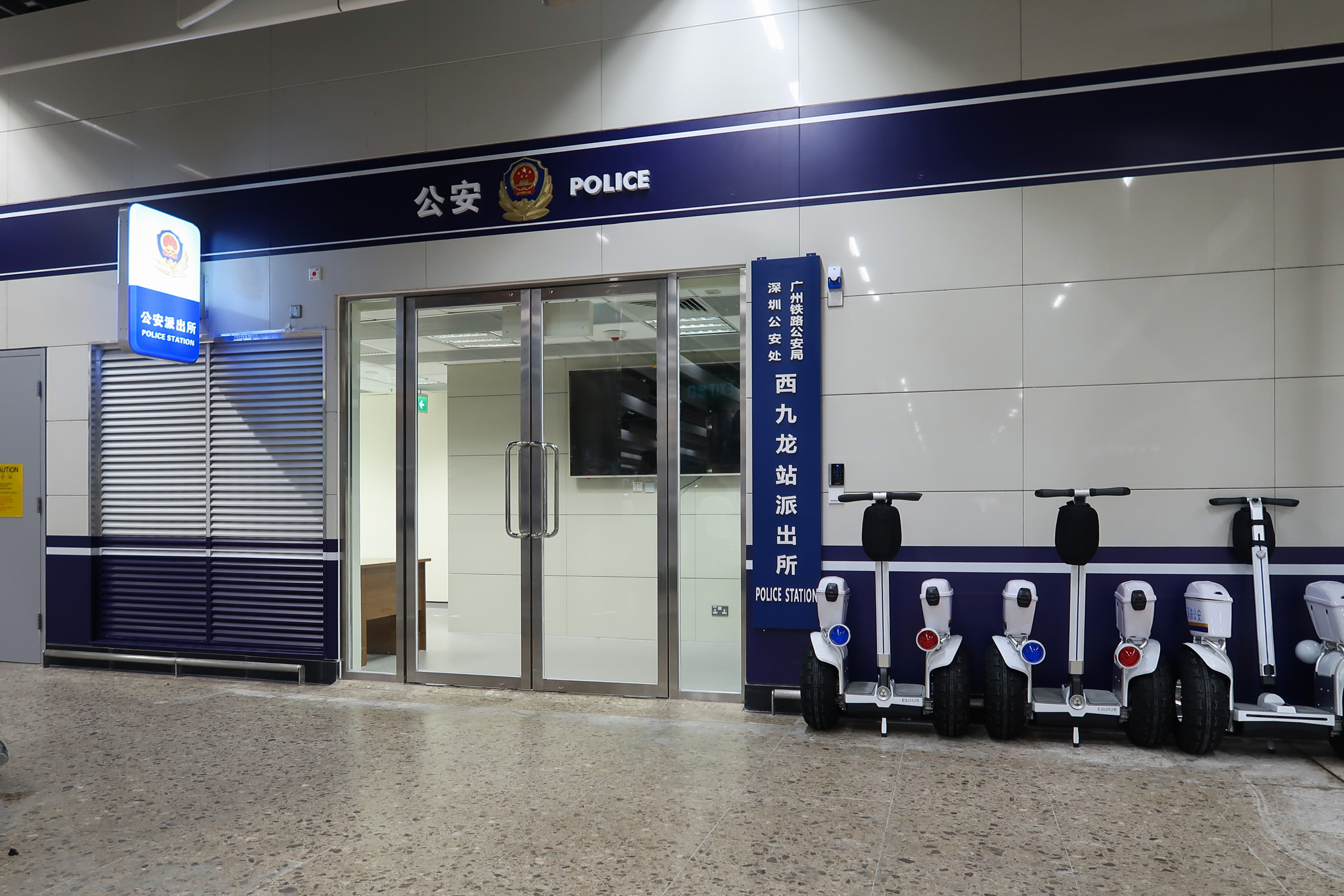
Police station in the Mainland Port Area

The Mainland Port Area is an area inside West Kowloon station that serves as a border control point between mainland China and Hong Kong. The area has been effectively ceded to mainland China for a token HK$1,000 a year in rent. Since September 2018, mainland Chinese immigration and police personnel operate exclusively within the area, and the laws of mainland China, rather than Hong Kong, are enforced.

This arrangement was controversial both before and after its implementation. Pro-democracy advocates were concerned about the erosion of Hong Kong's freedoms and autonomy under the "One Country, Two Systems" framework, and the Hong Kong Bar Association stated that the arrangement caused "the integrity of the Basic Law" to be "irreparably breached" and would "severely undermine" confidence in the rule of law in Hong Kong. Notably, the International Covenant on Civil and Political Rights, which applies in Hong Kong, does not apply in the Mainland Port Area, leading to human rights concerns.

=== Area definition ===
The area delineated and coloured orange on Plan No. 1 and Annex 1 to Plan No. 1 in Schedule 2 of the Guangzhou–Shenzhen–Hong Kong Express Rail Link (Co-location) Ordinance is declared as the Mainland Port Area. It comprises the China Customs and China Immigration Inspection checkpoints on B2 and B3 levels, the platform areas on B4 level, and the passageways connecting them. A train compartment of a passenger train in operation on the Hong Kong Section of the Express Rail Link is to be regarded as part of the Mainland Port Area. This arrangement will facilitate mainland border control preclearance in Hong Kong. Reports in the British press suggested this area amounts to a cession of 1,000,000 square feet (93,000 m^{2}) of the station for a token annual rent of HK$ 1,000 (reported as being equivalent to £99).

Except for reserved matters, the Mainland Port Area is to be regarded as an area lying outside Hong Kong but lying within mainland China for the purposes of the application of the laws of mainland China, and of the laws of Hong Kong, in the Mainland Port Area; and the delineation of jurisdiction over the Mainland Port Area. It does not affect the boundary of the administrative division of the Hong Kong Special Administrative Region.

Although the West Kowloon HSR station is listed on a page titled by the Shenzhen municipal government online, it is unclear whether this qualifies as a Port of Exit for the Shenzhen SEZ Visa on Arrival.

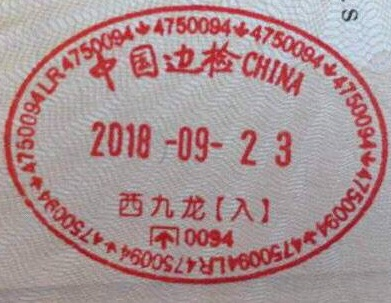
Entry stamp issued at juxtaposed controls at Hong Kong West Kowloon railway station

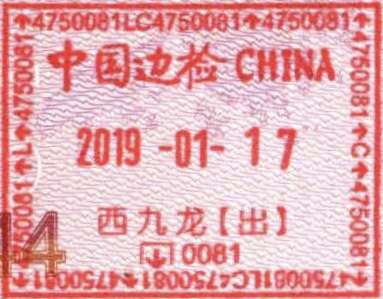
Exit stamp issued at juxtaposed controls at Hong Kong West Kowloon railway station on a Chinese passport

=== Implementation process ===
The joint meeting on 8 August 2017 of the Panel on Transport, the Panel on Security and the Panel on Administration of Justice and Legal Services of the Legislative Council passed the motion supporting the implementation of the "co-location arrangement" at the West Kowloon station.

The meeting on 15 November 2017 of the Legislative Council passed the motion on taking forward the follow-up tasks of the co-location arrangement at the West Kowloon station.

The Government of the Hong Kong Special Administrative Region signed the Co-operation Arrangement between the Mainland and the Hong Kong Special Administrative Region on the Establishment of the Port at the West Kowloon Station of the Guangzhou–Shenzhen–Hong Kong Express Rail Link for Implementing Co-location Arrangement with the People's Government of Guangdong Province on 18 November 2017.

On 27 December 2017, the Standing Committee of the National People's Congress approved the Co-operation Arrangement and stated that it is consistent with the Constitution of China and the Basic Law of the Hong Kong Special Administrative Region.

The Guangzhou–Shenzhen–Hong Kong Express Rail Link (Co-location) Bill was passed by the Legislative Council at the meeting on 14 June 2018. The Ordinance gazetted on 22 June 2018 and come into operation on a day to be appointed by the Secretary for Transport and Housing by notice published in the Hong Kong Government Gazette.

After a ceremony to "mark the commissioning of the Mainland Port Area" was held jointly by Frank Chan, Secretary for Transport and Housing, and "a leading Communist party official from Guangdong province", democracy activists noted that it constituted an erosion of the SAR's autonomy, with Tanya Chan reported as telling local radio that "the unlawful and unconstitutional joint checkpoint has been implemented forcefully — it has caused an irreparable damage to our legal system and rule of law." Chief Executive Carrie Lam, however, denied that there was any attempt to cover up the event, despite the ceremony being closed to press and being held without advance notice to news media or to members of the Legislative Council.

In the Court of First Instance of the High Court, Judge Anderson Chow refused the applications for leave to apply for judicial review by his decision dated 27 September 2017 and 18 April 2018. He refused the applications for interim relief by his decision dated 14 August 2018. He granted the applications for leave to apply for judicial review but dismissed the substantive applications for judicial review by his judgment dated 13 December 2018.

=== Mainland police operations ===
Since the Mainland Port Area began operations, there have been several reported cases of travellers being detained or arrested by mainland officials in Hong Kong. In one case, Simon Cheng, a Hong Kong resident working for the British consulate was detained upon returning to Hong Kong and sent back to mainland China by mainland police officers. Amid the 2019–20 Hong Kong protests, Chinese border officers have also begun to routinely search the phones of travellers for evidence of involvement in the protests.

== Construction ==
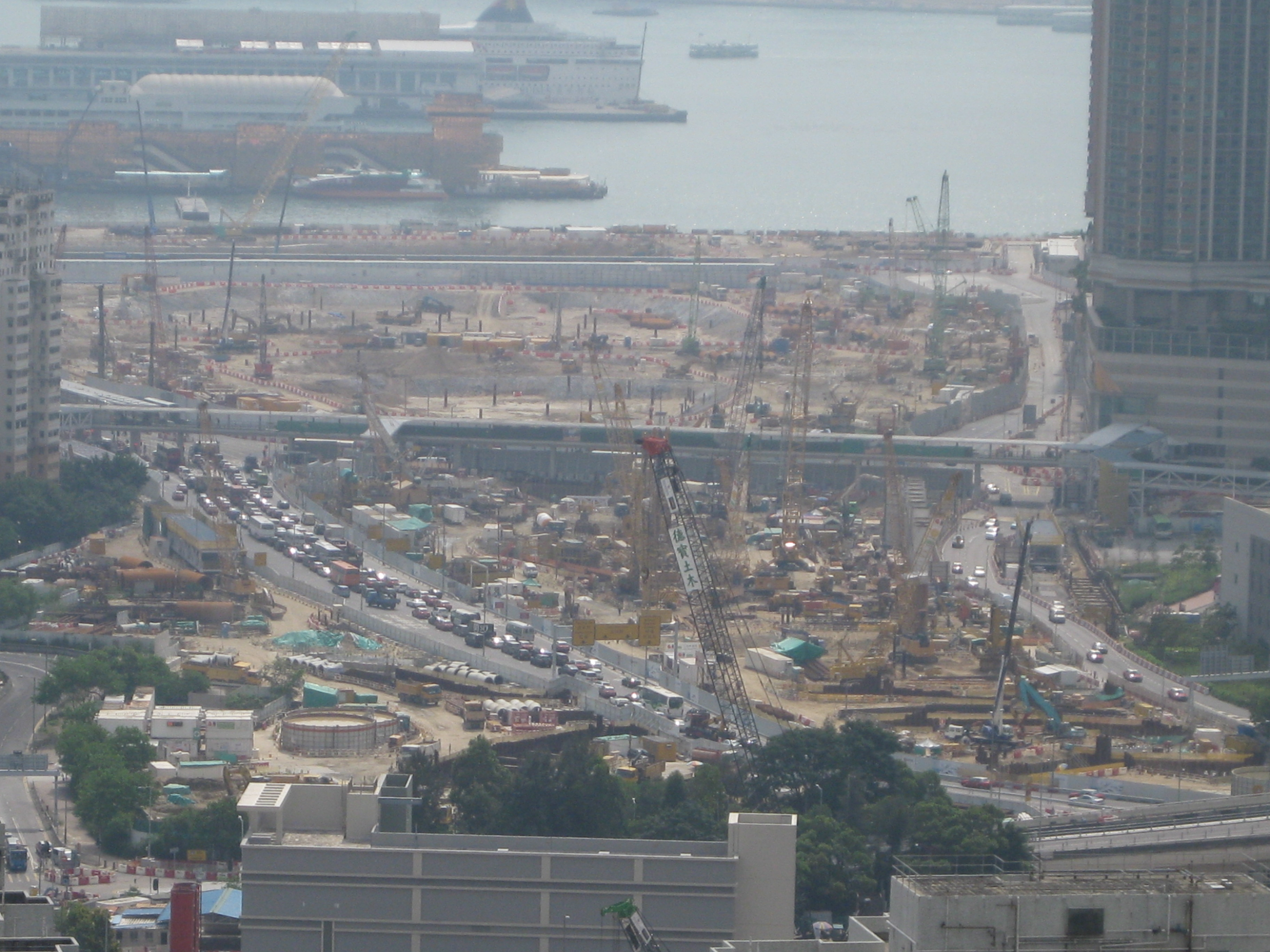
West Kowloon Terminus construction site

- This commenced on 30 December 2004, in line with the overall commencement of the Wuhan-Guangzhou passenger line, building the new Guangzhou South station.
- In September 2005, the National Development and Reform Commission officially approved the "Shenzhen-Hong Kong railway passenger line from Guangzhou to Shenzhen section Feasibility Study".
- On 18 December 2005, Guangzhou–Shenzhen–Hong Kong Express Rail Link's Guangzhou–Shenzhen section began formal construction.
- In January 2010, construction commenced on the Hong Kong section.
- In March 2011, Completion of the 10.8-km-long Shiziyang Tunnel to allow the railway to cross the Shiziyang Channel (Chinese: 狮子洋) of the Pearl River between the Dongchong and Humen Stations.
- On 26 December 2011, the Guangzhou–Shenzhen–Hong Kong Express Rail Guangzhou–Shenzhen section opened to Shenzhen North.
- On 30 March 2014, Severe storm hits Hong Kong, flooding the tunnels and damaged the Tunnel Boring Machines. This has caused a 3-month delay to construction.
- On 31 December 2014, The tunnel linking Shenzhen North station and Futian station was reported completed. The construction of the tunnel, which runs about 10 kilometers, took about six years.
- On 30 December 2015, Futian station commences intercity train operations.

== Operations ==
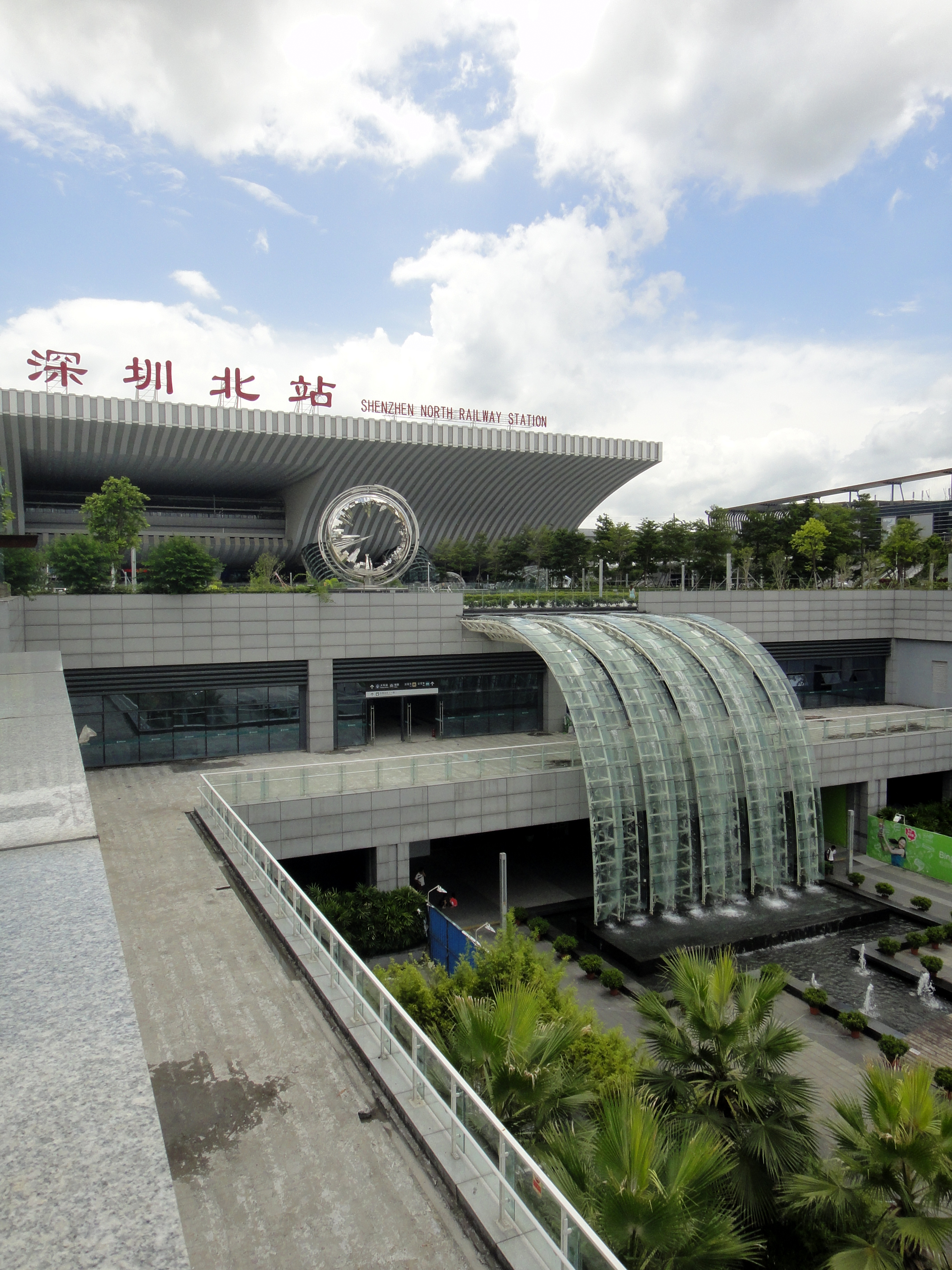
Shenzhen North station east square

At present, Guangzhou–Shenzhen–Hong Kong Express Rail operates around 104 northbound trains and 101 southbound trains a day, three pairs of separate lines on weekends, a separate peak line 20 pairs and 7 high-speed sleeper train pairs, including:

- Guangzhou South ↔ Chaoshan - 8 pairs, plus additional pairs for peak service
- Guangzhou South ↔ Shanghai Hongqiao - 3 high-speed sleeper train pairs
- Guangzhou South → Shenzhen North - 17 trains, plus additional pairs for weekend and peak service; Shenzhen North → Guangzhou South - 20 trains, plus additional pairs for weekend and peak service
- Guangzhou South ↔ Futian - 23 pairs, plus additional pairs for peak service
- Shenzhen North ↔ Guilin North - 3 pairs
- Shenzhen North ↔ Guiyang North - 1 pair
- Shenzhen North ↔ Nanning East - 3 pairs
- Shenzhen North ↔ Yongzhou - 1 pair
- Shenzhen North ↔ Changsha South - 12 pairs
- Shenzhen North ↔ Shaoyang - 2 pairs
- Shenzhen North ↔ Huaihua South - 4 pairs
- Shenzhen North ↔ Nanchang West- 2 pairs
- Shenzhen North ↔ Yueyang East - 1 pair
- Wuhan ↔ Shenzhen North - 12 pairs
- Yichang ↔ Shenzhen North - 1 pair
- Shenzhen North ↔ Chongqing North - 1 pair
- Shenzhen North ↔ Jinan West - 1 pair
- Shenzhen North ↔ Luohe West - 1 pair
- Shenzhen North ↔ Zhengzhou East - 2 pairs, an additional pair for peak service
- Shenzhen North ↔ Xi'an North - 3 pairs, an additional pair for peak service
- Shenzhen North ↔ Shijiazhuang - 1 pair
- Shenzhen North ↔ Beijing West - 2 pairs plus 4 high-speed sleeper train pairs

In December 2014, overnight high-speed sleeper trains were added to several long-distance destinations, such as Beijing.

== List of stations ==
Station Name		Opened	Transfer / Interchange	District	City	Pictures
English	Simplified Chinese (Traditional Chinese)	Opened	Transfer / Interchange	District	City	Pictures
Guangzhou South (Guangzhounan)	广州南 (廣州南)	30 January 2010	CRH: Beijing–Guangzhou–Shenzhen–Hong Kong high-speed railway; Guiyang–Guangzhou high-speed railway; Nanning–Guangzhou high-speed railway; Guangzhou–Zhuhai intercity railway; Foshan–Dongguan intercity railway; Guangzhou–Foshan circular intercity railway; Guangzhou Metro: 2 7 22; Foshan Metro: 2	Panyu	Guangzhou	
Nansha North	南沙北 (南沙北)	26 December 2011	Guangzhou Metro: 4	Nansha	Guangzhou	
Humen	虎门 (虎門)	26 December 2011	CRH (Transfer to Humen North): Guangzhou–Shenzhen intercity railway; Dongguan Metro: 2	Humen	Dongguan	
Guangmingcheng	光明城 (光明城)	26 December 2011	CRH: Beijing–Guangzhou–Shenzhen–Hong Kong high-speed railway; Shenzhen Metro: 6B 13	Guangming	Shenzhen	
Shenzhen North (Shenzhenbei)	深圳北 (深圳北)	26 December 2011	CRH: Beijing–Guangzhou–Shenzhen–Hong Kong high-speed railway; Hangzhou–Fuzhou–Shenzhen railway; Shenzhen–Zhanjiang high-speed railway (partially open); Shenzhen Metro: 4 5 6	Longhua	Shenzhen	
Futian	福田 (福田)	30 December 2015	Shenzhen Metro: 2 3 11	Futian	Shenzhen	
Hong Kong; West Kowloon	香港西九龙 (香港西九龍)	23 September 2018	MTR Kowloon station: Tung Chung line; Airport Express; MTR Austin station: Tuen Ma line	Yau Tsim Mong	Hong Kong SAR	

== Trains and equipment ==
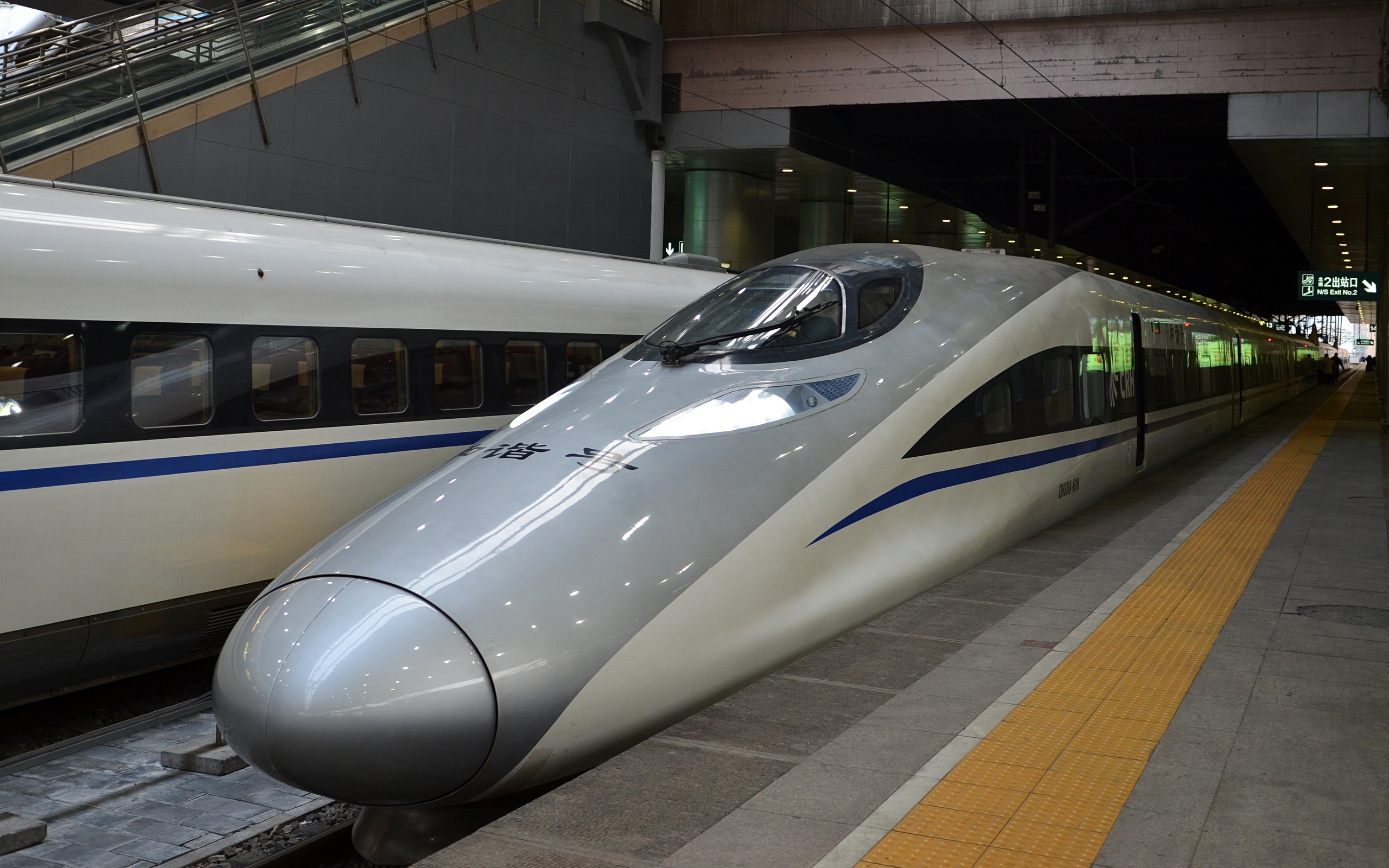
CRH380A EMU (CR version)

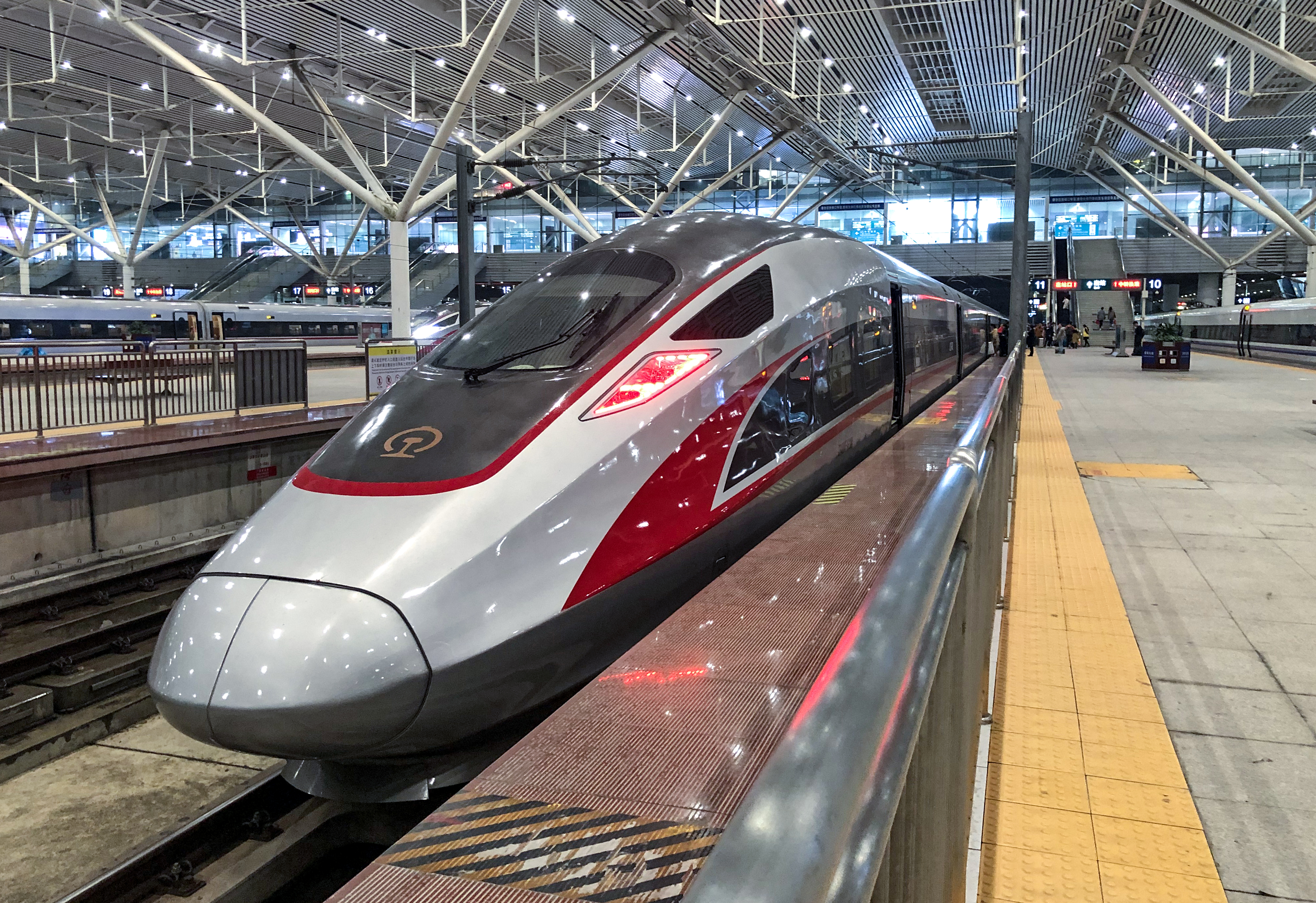
CR400AF-A EMU

The following is a list of operators using the line and their respective rolling stock :

Railway Group	Rolling Stock
CR Guangzhou	CRH2E, CRH3C, CRH380A (Note: example includes irregularly added train pair G9697 / G9698 at which a CRH380A business-class train car number contains “79603” was in use as observed from photograph in press.), CRH380B, CR400AF, CR400AF-A
CR Shanghai	CRH1E, CR400BF-A
CR Nanchang	CRH380A
CR Wuhan	CRH380AL, CRH380A
CR Zhengzhou	CRH380AL
CR Xi'an	CRH380AL, CRH380B
CR Beijing	CR400AF, CRH380AL, CRH2E
MTR	Vibrant Express (MTR CRH380A)

In Hong Kong, MTR announced their intention to purchase several high-speed EMUs. The tender (contract number: 840) was for 9 trainsets, each with 8 cars and a maximum operating speed of 350 km/h. Chinese manufacturer CSR Qingdao Sifang emerged as the successful bidder, based on the CRH380A "Harmony" model. The purchase contract was signed on 16 April 2012 at the headquarters of MTR.

== Tickets ==
Train fare table G numbered trains (Business seat fare / VIP Class fare / First Class fare / Second Class fare; Unit: yuan; tickets for children, disabled veterans half price tickets, student tickets share a quarter discount of the fare for a Second Class ticket.)

Guangzhou South
64.5 / 44.5 / 34.5 / 24.5	Qingsheng					
99.5 / 59.5 / 49.5 / 34.5	39.5 / 24.5 / 19.5 / 14.5	Humen				
169.5 / 99.5 / 84.5 / 59.5	104.5 / 64.5 / 54.5 / 40	64.5 / 44.5 / 34.5 / 24.5	Guangmingcheng			
199.5 / 119.5 / 99.5 / 74.5	139.5 / 84.5 / 69.5 / 49.5	104.5 / 64.5 / 54.5 / 39.5	39.5 / 24.5 / 19.5 / 14.5	Shenzhen North		
215 / 130 / 108 / 82	—N/a	120 / 70 / 60 / 45	30 / na / 24 / 18	40 / 25 / 20 / 15	Futian	
645 / 387 / 344 / 215	555 / 333 / 296 / 185	533 / 320 / 285 / 178	284 / 171 / 152 / 95	226 / 136 / 120 / 75	204 / 122 / 109 / 68	West Kowloon

== Accidents and incidents ==
- At 6:30 on 18 February 2012, power supply equipment failure, resulting in train delays.
- On 26 September 2018, an inbound CR400BF-A trainset was unable to completely open one of its doors at West Kowloon station, as the platform edge exceeded the track's structure gauge. The train was redirected to platform 6. No casualties or injuries were reported. As a result, MTR stated that they were working with mainland authorities to investigate and address the issue and that all inbound CR400BF-A trains were to only use platform 6 until the problem was eliminated.

== See also ==
- Hong Kong Express Rail Link
  - Anti-Hong Kong Express Rail Link movement
- Guangzhou–Kowloon through train
- East Rail line
- Kowloon–Canton Railway
- China Railway High-speed
- Guangzhou–Shenzhen railway
- Pearl River Delta mega-city project
