= Guangzhou–Hong Kong high-speed train =

Railway service in China and Hong Kong

Guangzhou–Hong Kong high-speed train 穗港高速动车组列车 穗港高速動車組列車
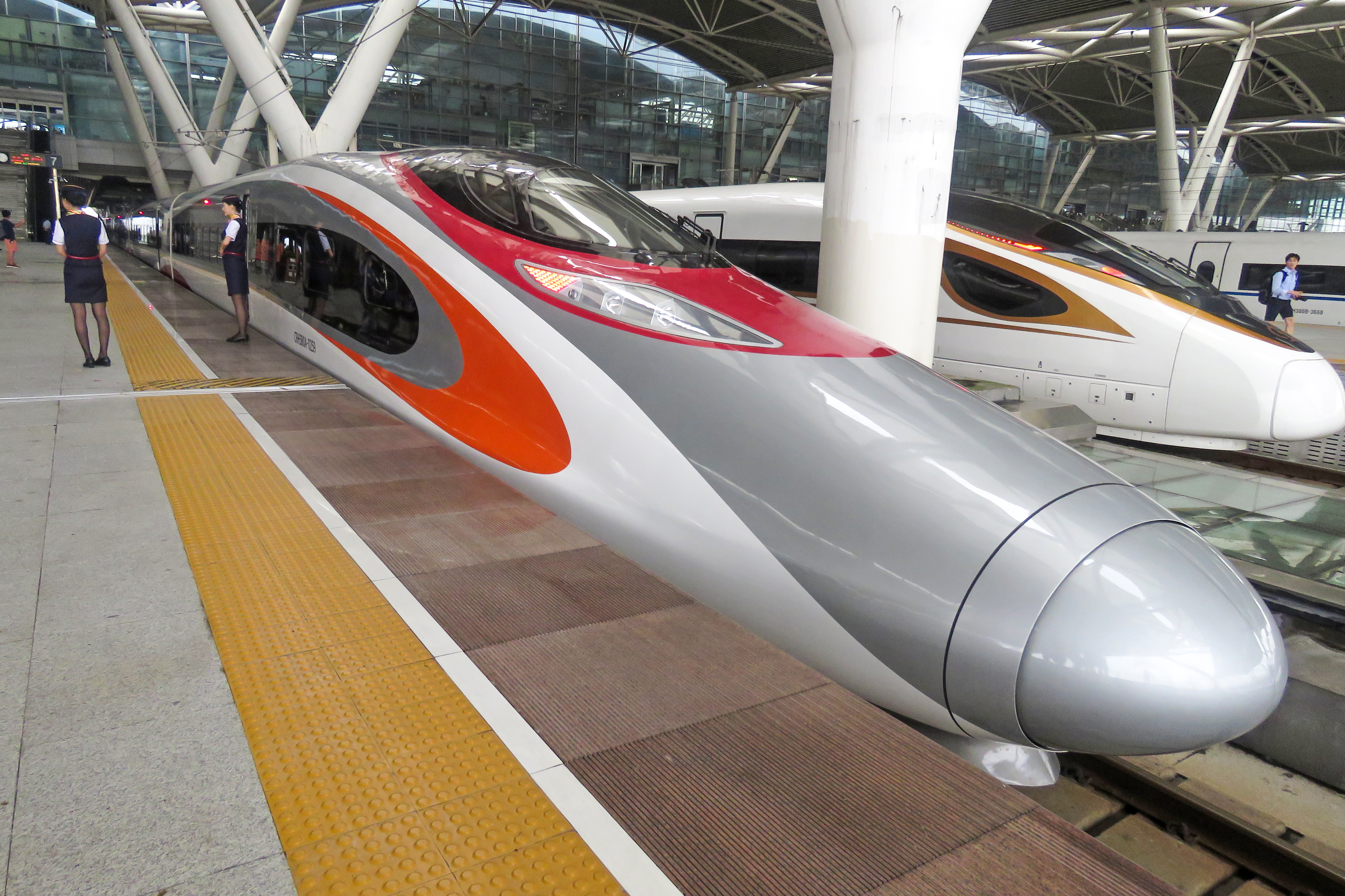
- An Vibrant Express EMU on the G6581 service (front) and a CR400BF-A EMU on G6503 service (back) at Guangzhou South

Overview
- Service type: G-series trains
- Status: Operational
- Locale: Guangdong province; Hong Kong SAR
- Predecessor: Guangzhou-Kowloon through train
- First service: September 23, 2018 (to Guangzhou South); January 15, 2023 (to Guangzhou East)
- Current operators: China Railway High-speed; MTR

Route
- Termini: Guangzhou South; Guangzhou East; Hong Kong West Kowloon
- Distance travelled: 142 kilometres (88 mi)
- Average journey time: 47m - 1h 30m
- Train numbers: G6501-G6516、G6525-G6530、G6534-G6540 (operated by CRH, for Guangzhou South); G6545-G6570 (operated by CRH, for Guangzhou East); G6581-G6588 (operated by MTR)
- Lines used: Guangshengang XRL; Ganzhou–Shenzhen high-speed railway, Guangshen Railway

On-board services
- Classes: Business seat (only CR400 trains); First class seat; Second class seat
- Catering facilities: Dining car (only CR400, CR300 trains); Trolley refreshment service

Technical
- Rolling stock: CR300AF; CR400AF; CR400BF; Vibrant Express
- Track gauge: 1,435 mm (4 ft 8 1/2 in)
- Electrification: 25 kV 50 Hz AC (Overhead line)
- Operating speed: 350 km/h (Shenzhen North - Dongguan South); 300 km/h (Guangzhou South - Shenzhen North); 200 km/h (Shenzhen North - West Kowloon, Dongguan South - Guangzhou East)
- Track owners: CR Guangzhou (mainland section); MTR (Hong Kong section)

The Guangzhou–Hong Kong high-speed train (simplified Chinese: 穗港高速动车组列车; traditional Chinese: 穗港高速動車組列車) are high-speed train services operating between Hong Kong West Kowloon in Hong Kong and Guangzhou, at which both the Guangzhou South Station and Guangzhou East Station are in use.

== History ==
- On September 23, 2018, due to the opening of the Hong Kong section of the Guangzhou–Shenzhen–Hong Kong Express Rail Link, the originally Guangzhou-Shenzhen high-speed trains numbered G6501-G6558 were extended to serve Hong Kong West Kowloon station, becoming the "Guangzhou-Hong Kong high-speed trains". At the same time, the MTR Corporation's Vibrant Express also started operations, launching Guangzhou-Hong Kong high-speed trains numbered G6581-G6588。
- From July 10, 2019, due to the adjustment of the national railway operation map, 4 Guangzhou-Hong Kong high-speed trains became the Tianjin-Hong Kong high-speed train, the Chongqing-Hong Kong high-speed train, Nanning-Hong Kong high-speed train and the Zhaoqing-Hong Kong high-speed train, reducing the number of direct trains to 2 round trips. In addition, trains G6508/13/14 were officially put into operation the next day due to the Chongqing-Hong Kong high-speed train needing to go back to the depot.
- Due to the COVID-19 pandemic, from January 30, 2020, services to and from Hong Kong West Kowloon station were temporarily suspended, resulting in Guangzhou-Hong Kong high-speed trains numbered G6515-6519, G6521-6525, G6533-6535, G6537, G6539/40 were shortened to Futian, while G6541/36 was shortened to Shenzhen North. Other trains were cancelled, with affected passengers receiving an unconditional refund.
- From January 15, 2023, services between Hong Kong West Kowloon and Guangzhou South resumed and new services to Guangzhou East railway station were started (branded as "The new Guangzhoudong route", the "Guangzhou–Kowloon through train", and the "Guangzhou-Kowloon high-speed through train"), utilising China Railway CRH1A-A trains as power and it has intermediate stops at Dongguan South and Dongguan stations. The train would depart Hong Kong West Kowloon, then arrive at Shenzhen North, run on the Ganzhou–Shenzhen high-speed railway connecting line from 2021, then connecting to the Guangzhou-Shenzhen railway after Dongguan South station. The full-trip first-class and second-class ticket prices are the same as those for the train to Guangzhou South Station. On January 15, the Guangzhou-Kowloon Passenger Transport Section invited four generations of Guangzhou-Kowloon Through Train crew members to board the first train, G6551, from Guangzhou East to Hong Kong West Kowloon.
- On April 1, 2023, as trains from Hong Kong West Kowloon Station to outside Guangdong Province were resuming, the number of trains from Hong Kong West Kowloon to Guangzhou South returned to the pre-epidemic period, and 4 of the trains from Hong Kong West Kowloon to Guangzhou East did not stop at Dongguan Station, but stopped at Changping railway station instead. At the same time, all trains between Hong Kong West Kowloon and Guangzhou East have also been replaced with the CRH1A Electric Multiple Unit, other than G6501/2 which was operated by the Fuxing CR400BF-Z Smart Electrical Multiple Unit.
- From April 5, 2023, Train no. G6538 no longer stopped at Humen. It would stop at Qingsheng railway station instead.
- On July 1, 2023, China Railway adjusted the operation map and added 3 pairs of trains between Hong Kong West Kowloon and Guangzhou East, increasing the number of trains from Hong Kong West Kowloon to Guangzhou East to 10 and the number of trains from Guangzhou East to 9 every day.。
- On October 11, 2023, China Railway adjusted the operation map and the rolling stock used on the Guangzhou East to Hong Kong West Kowloon services were changed from CRH1A-A trains to CR300AF trains, while an additional service from Guangzhou East to Hong Kong West Kowloon was added.
- On January 10, 2024, China Railway adjusted the operation map and the last train from Guangzhou East was made to depart at 20:50.

== Operations ==
- ● : stop at the station
- － : pass the station

=== Towards Hong Kong West Kowloon ===
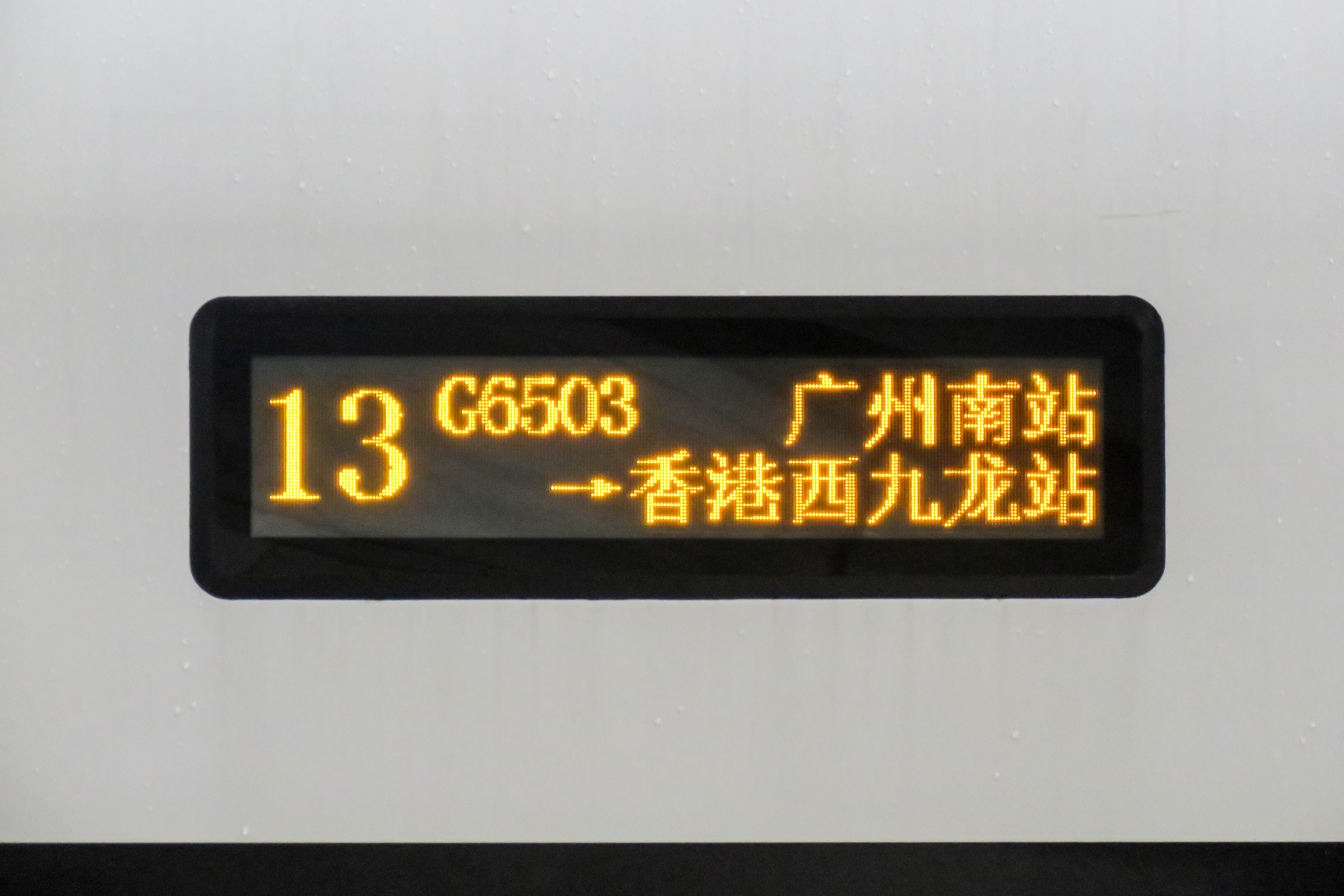
The display board outside a train on the G6503 service

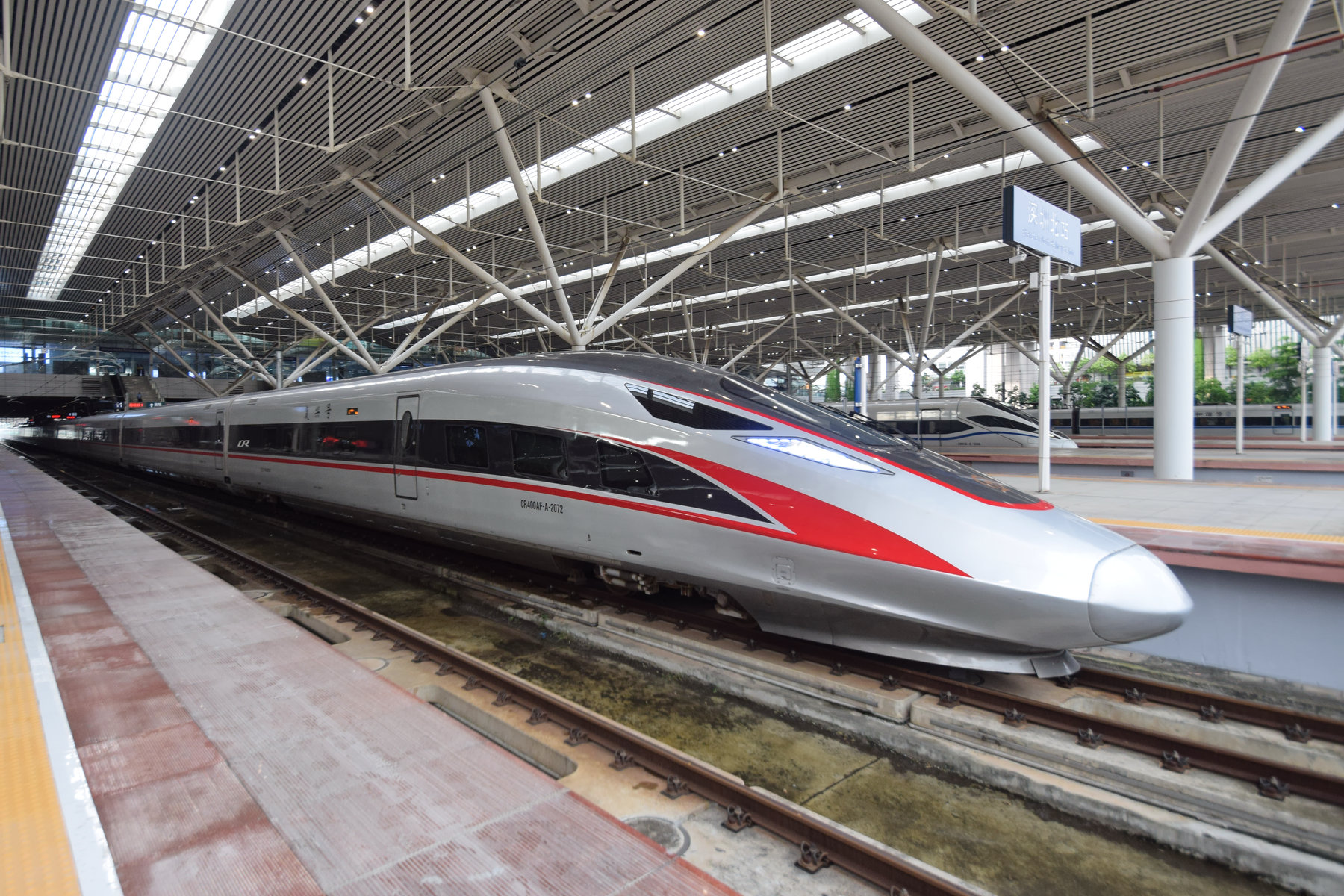
A CR400AF-A EMU on G6511 train at Shenzhen North

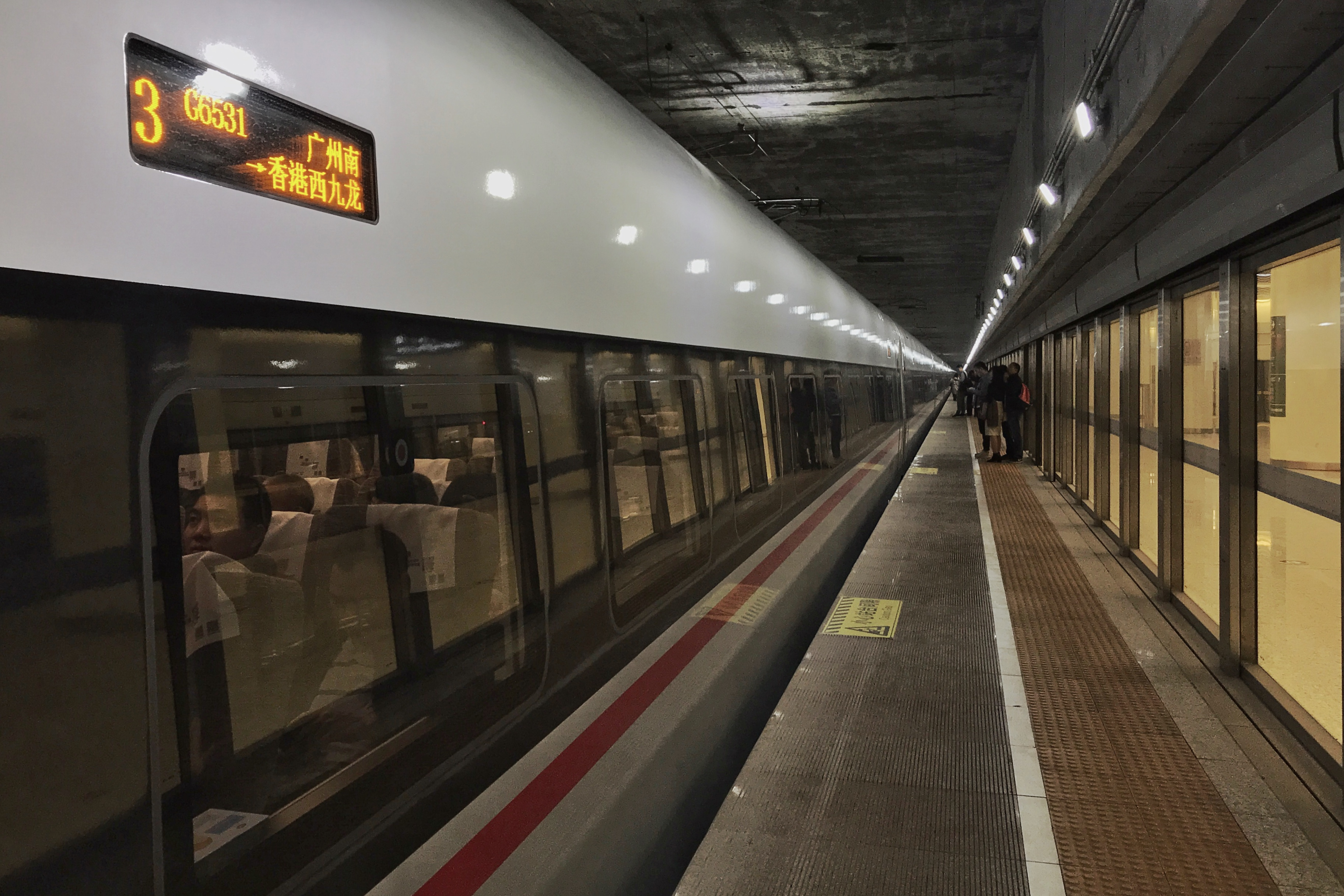
G6531 train at Futian

From Guangzhou South
Train No.	Departure	Guangzhou South	Qingsheng	Humen	Guangmingcheng	Shenzhen North	Futian	Hong Kong West Kowloon	Notes
G6539	07:04	●	●	－	●	●	－	●	
G6505	08:16	●	●	●	－	●	－	●	
G6527	08:41	●	－	●	●	●	－	●	
G6581	09:46	●	－	●	－	●	－	●	Operated by MTR Vibrant Express
G6503	10:02	●	－	－	－	－	－	●	
G6511	10:42	●	－	－	－	●	－	●	
G6515	10:57	●	－	●	●	●	－	●	
G6541	11:27	●	－	－	－	●	－	●	
G6529	11:55	●	－	●	－	●	－	●	
G6583	12:16	●	－	－	－	●	－	●	Operated by MTR Vibrant Express
G6525	13:53	●	－	●	－	●	－	●	
G6531	15:00	●	－		－	●	－	●	
G6537	15:27	●	－	●	－	●	－	●	
G6513	17:57	●	－	－	－	－	－	●	
G6585	18:33	●	－	●	－	●	●	●	Operated by MTR Vibrant Express
G6509	20:26	●	－	●	－	●	－	●	
G6587	21:50	●	－	－	－	－	－	●	Operated by MTR Vibrant Express

From Guangzhou East
Train No.	Departure	Guangzhou East	Dongguan	Changping	Dongguan South	Shenzhen North	Futian	Hong Kong West Kowloon
G6551	07:56	●	－	●	●	●	－	●
G6553	10:13	●	●	－	●	●	－	●
G6555	12:01	●	●	－	●	●	－	●
G6557	14:27	●	－	●	●	●	●	●
G6559	16:19	●	●	－	●	●	－	●
G6561	19:56	●	●	－	●	●	●	●

=== Towards Guangzhou South ===
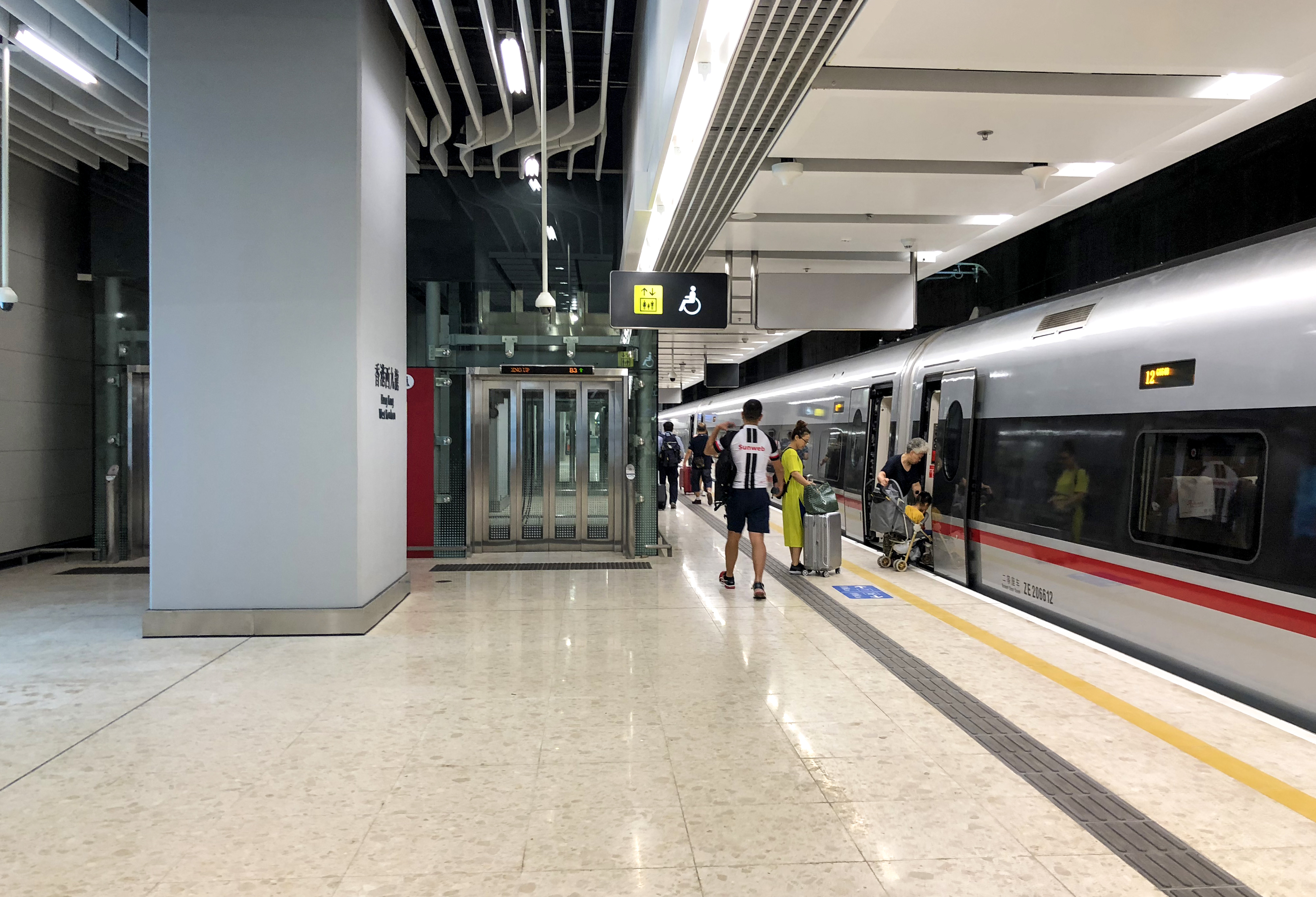
The G6548 train at Hong Kong West Kowloon

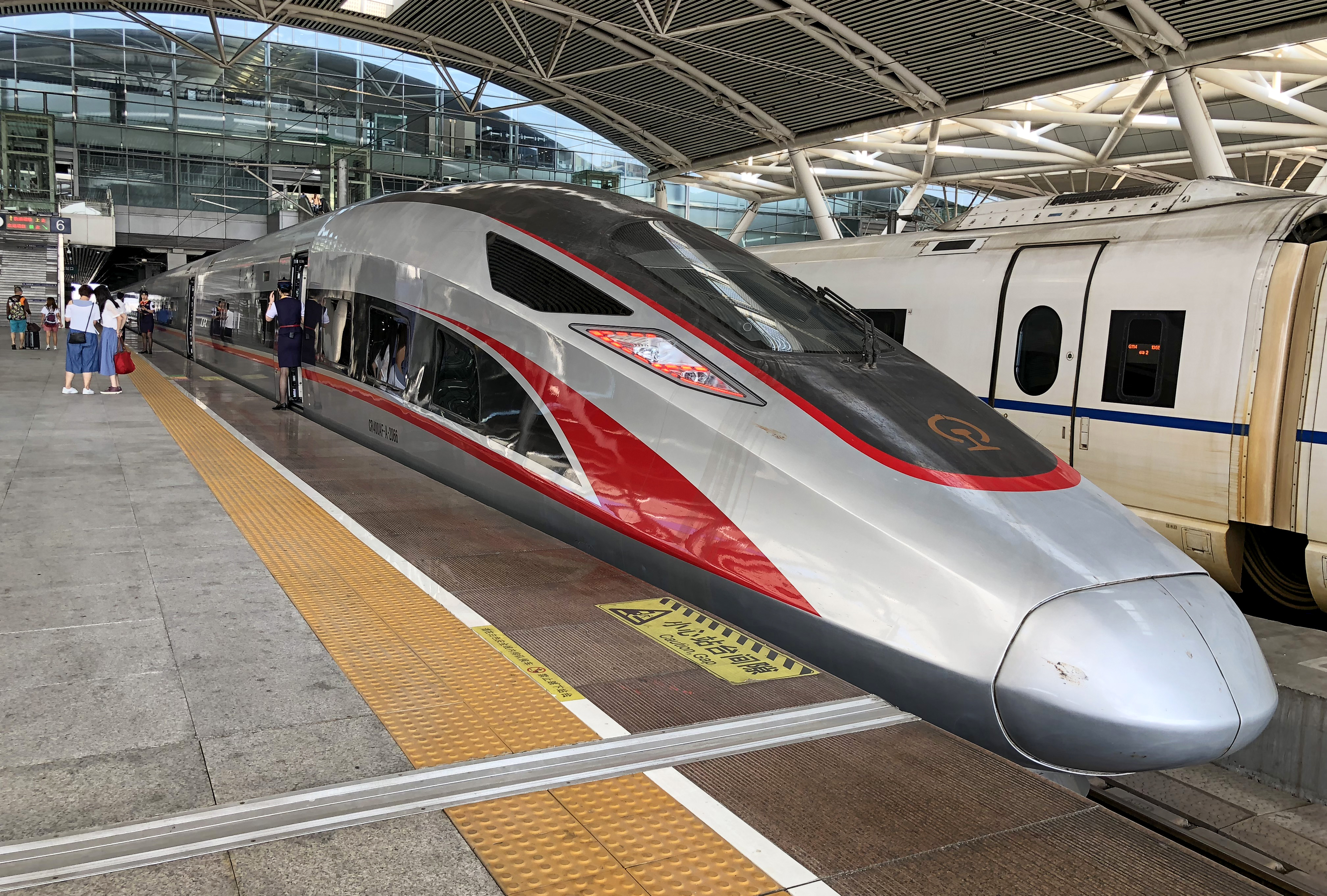
A CR400AF-A EMU on G6548 service arriving Guangzhou South

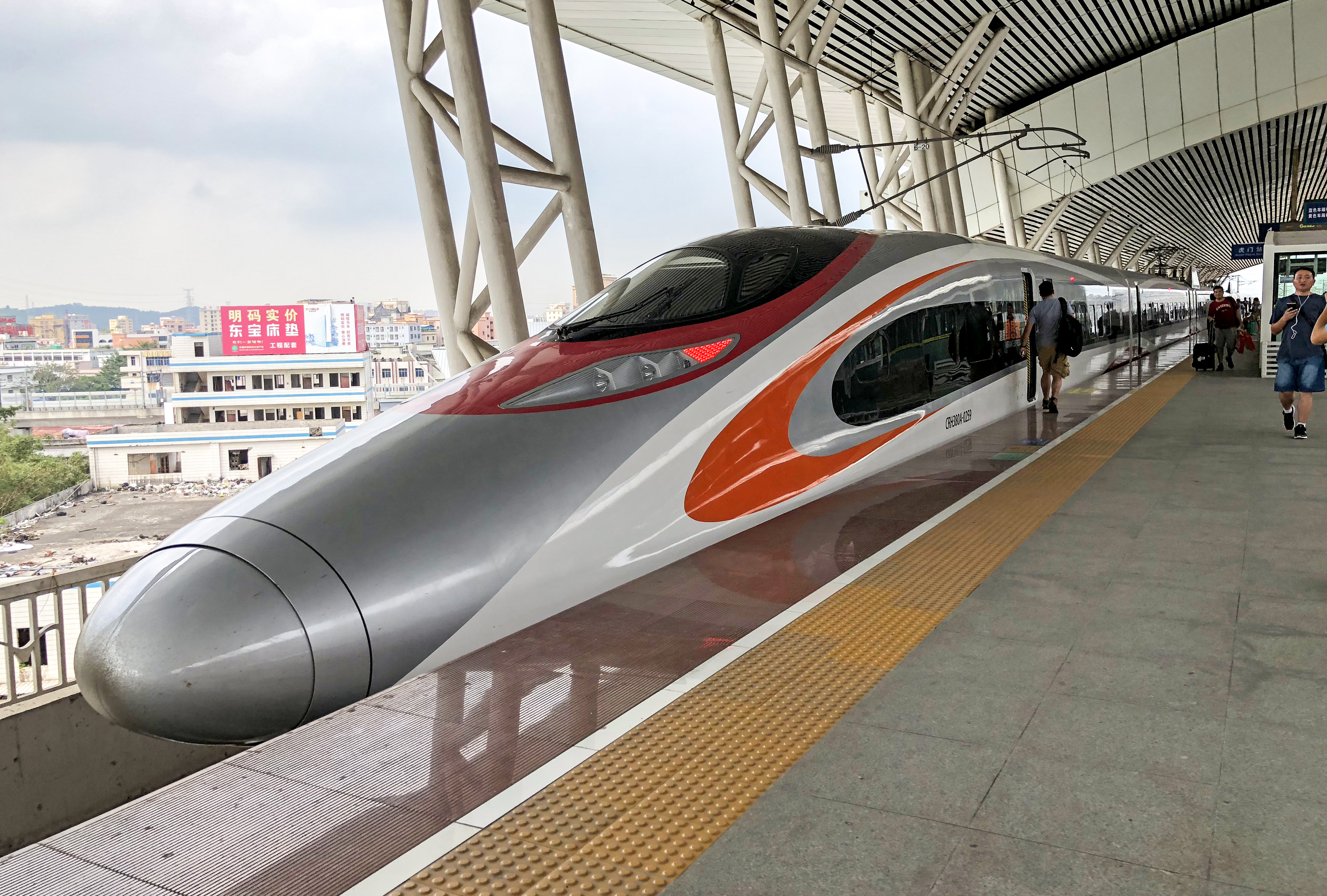
The MTR-operated G6582 train at Humen

Train No.	Departure	Hong Kong West Kowloon	Futian	Shenzhen North	Guangmingcheng	Humen	Qingsheng	Guangzhou South	Notes
G6582	08:25	●	●	●	-	●	-	●	Operated by MTR Vibrant Express
G6510	09:19	●	-	●	-	●	-	●	
G6540	10:05	●	-		-		-	●	
G6534	10:42	●	-	●	-	●	-	●	
G6584	11:15	●	-	●	-		-	●	Operated by MTR Vibrant Express
G6516	12:31	●	-	●	-	●	-	●	
G6530	13:25	●	●	●	-	●	-	●	
G6536	13:50	●	-	●	-	●	-	●	
G6542	15:10	●	●	●	-	●	-	●	
G6508	16:19	●		●	-	●	-	●	
G6586	16:57	●	-	●	●	-	-	●	Operated by MTR Vibrant Express
G6526	17:13	●	-	-	-	-	-	●	
G6538	17:30	●	-	●	-		●	●	
G6502	18:55	●	-	●	-	●	-	●	
G6514	19:06	●	-	●	-	●	-	●	
G6588	20:02	●	●	●	-	●	-	●	Operated by MTR Vibrant Express
G6506	22:21	●	-	●	-	-	-	●	
G6504	22:50	●	-	●	-	-	-	●	

=== Towards Guangzhou East ===
Train No.	Departure	Hong Kong West Kowloon	Futian	Shenzhen North	Dongguan South	Changping	Dongguan	Guangzhou East
G6552	08:06	●	-	●	●	-	-	●
G6554	10:00	●	-	●	●	●	-	●
G6556	12:26	●	-	●	●	-	●	●
G6558	14:19	●	-	●	●	-	●	●
G6560	16:42	●	-	●	●	-	●	●
G6562	19:21	●	-	●	●	●	-	●
G6564	22:12	●	-	●	●	-	-	●

=== Other services ===
There are some other trains also providing high-speed train connections between Guangzhou and Hong Kong.

- The G79/80 Beijing–Hong Kong high-speed train
- The G99/100 Shanghai–Hong Kong high-speed train
- The G6113/6114 Changsha–Hong Kong high-speed train
- The G314/1 and G312/3 Kunming–Hong Kong high-speed train

== Rolling stocks ==
CR400AF-A EMUs are used on the trains operated by CR Guangzhou and CR400BF-A EMUs are used on the G6503/6504 trains operated by CR Shanghai. The EMUs have the formation shown below.

Car No.	1	2	3-7	8	9	10-14	15	16
Type	SW; Business	ZY; First class	ZE; Second class	ZE; Second class	ZEC; Second class/Dining car	ZE; Second class	ZY; Second class	ZYS; Business/First class

The Vibrant Express of MTR are operated by 8-car trainsets with first and second class seats only. A total of 68 first class seats are available in the first and last cars in 2+2 formation. The middle cars offer 511 second class seats in 3+2 formation, with wheelchair spaces are provided on the seventh car.

Car No.	1	2-6	7	8
Type	ZY; First class	ZE; Second class	ZE; Second class	ZY; First class

CRH1A are used on the trains operated by CR Guangzhou for train services between Hong Kong West Kowloon Station and Guangzhou East Station. Due to the performance limitation of the train and the speed limit of the road section, its maximum operating speed is 200 km/h.

Car No.	1	2-4	5	6-7	8
Type	ZY; First Class	ZE; Second class	ZEC; Second class/Dining car	ZE; Second class	ZYT; First class/Premier
