= Dongguan railway station =

Dongguan railway station may refer to:

- Dongguan railway station (Guangdong), in Dongguan, Guangdong, China
- Shangyu South railway station (formerly known as Dongguan railway station as the construction name), on the Hangzhou–Taizhou high-speed railway in Shangyu District, Shaoxing, Zhejiang, China
- Dongguanzhen railway station, on the Xiaoshan–Ningbo railway and Shaoxing Urban Rail Line in Shaoxing, Zhejiang, China
- Changping railway station (Guangdong), known as Dongguan railway station until 2014

== See also ==
- Dongguan East railway station, Changping, Dongguan, Guangdong, China
- Dongguan South railway station, Tangxia, Dongguan, Guangdong, China
- Dongguan West railway station, Daojiao, Dongguan, Guangdong, China
- Changping Dongguan station, a station of the Beijing Subway in Changping District, Beijing, China
- Dongguang station, a metro station at Chengdu, Sichuan, China
