= Hong Kong West Kowloon station =

Railway station in Kowloon, Hong Kong

Coordinates: 22°18′13″N 114°09′54″E

Hong Kong West Kowloon 香港西九龍
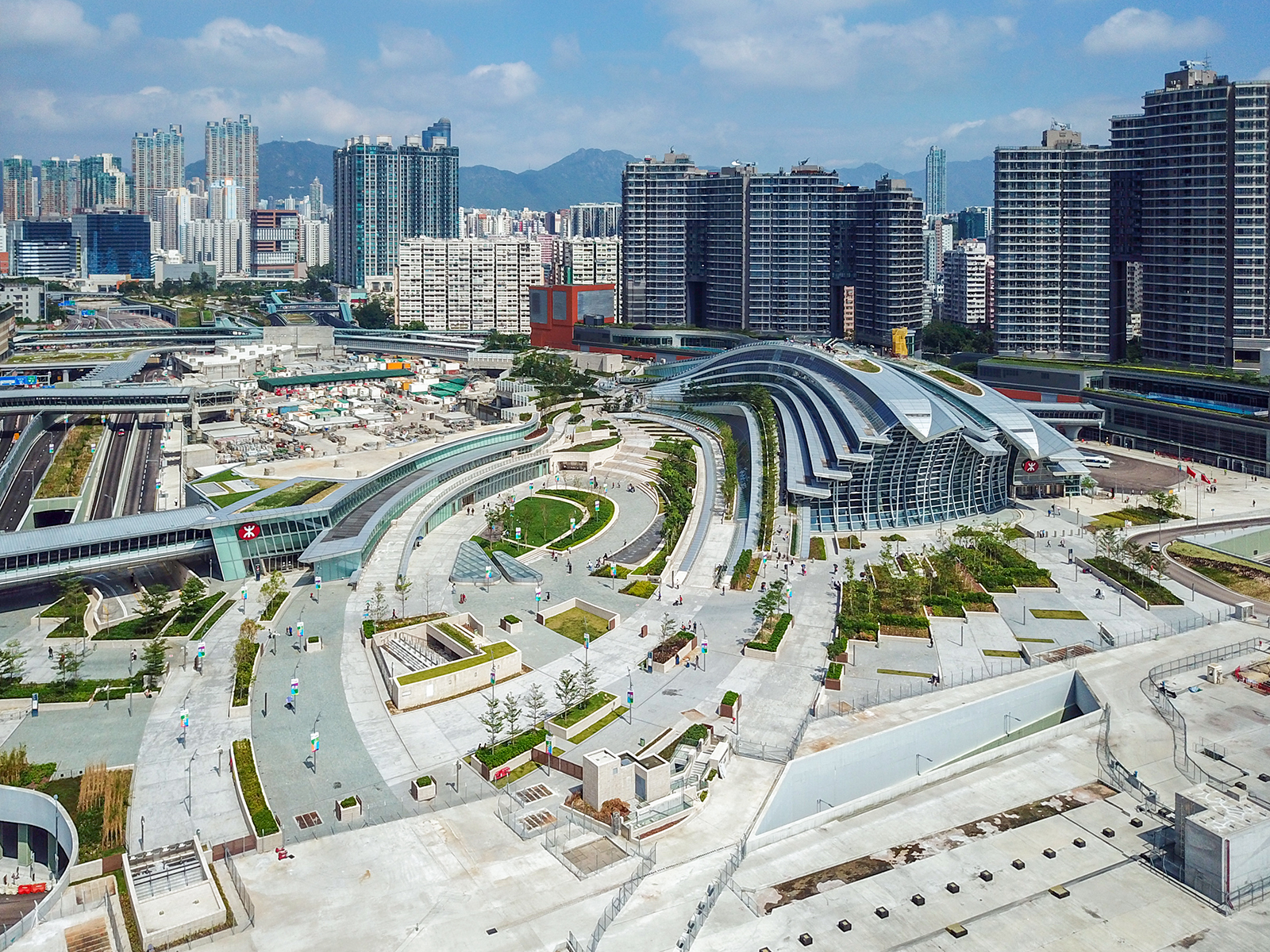
- West Kowloon station (2018)

Chinese name
- Traditional Chinese: 香港西九龍站
- Simplified Chinese: 香港西九龙站
- Cantonese Yale: Hēunggóng Sāi Gáulùhng Jaahm
- Jyutping: hoeng1 gong2 sai1 gau2 lung4 zaam6
Transcriptions
Standard Mandarin
- Hanyu Pinyin: Xiānggǎng Xī Jiǔlóng Zhàn
- Wade–Giles: Hsiang^{1}-kang^{2} Hsi^{1} Chiu^{3}-lung^{2} Chan^{4}
Yue: Cantonese
- Yale Romanization: Hēunggóng Sāi Gáulùhng Jaahm
- Jyutping: hoeng1 gong2 sai1 gau2 lung4 zaam6

General information
- Other names: West Kowloon
- Location: 3 Austin Road West; Tsim Sha Tsui; Hong Kong
- System: High-speed rail station
- Owner: KCR Corporation
- Operator: MTR Corporation
- Line: Guangzhou–Shenzhen–Hong Kong XRL
- Platforms: 21 (14 in use); Long-haul: 6 (2 island platforms and 2 side platforms); Short-haul: 8 (3 island platforms and 2 side platforms in Spanish solution)
- Tracks: 15 (10 in use); Long-haul: 6; Short-haul: 4
- Train operators: MTRC (only to Futian, Shenzhenbei, Guangzhounan, and intermediate stops on the Guangzhounan route); China Railway
- Connections: Kowloon: Tung Chung line; Airport Express; Austin Exit C: Tuen Ma line

Construction
- Structure type: Underground
- Platform levels: 1
- Accessible: yes
- Architect: Aedas

Other information
- Status: In operation
- Station code: MTR code: WEK; Immigration Department: XRL; TMIS code: 65896; Telegraph code: XJA; Pinyin code: XGL

History
- Opened: 23 September 2018; 8 years ago (initial opening); 15 January 2023; 3 years ago (reopening)
- Closed: 30 January 2020 – 14 January 2023 (temporary, due to COVID-19 pandemic)
- Electrified: 25 kV 50 Hz AC (Overhead lines)

Passengers
- 2018: 5.3 million (annual, service began on 23 September)
- 2019: 16.9 million (annual) ▲219.2%
- 2020: 1 million (annual, service suspended from 30 January) ▼93.9%

Services
Preceding station	China Railway High-speed	Following station
Futian towards Beijing West	Beijing–Guangzhou–Shenzhen–Hong Kong high-speed railway	Terminus
Transfer at Kowloon
Preceding station	MTR	Following station
Hong Kong Terminus	Tung Chung line transfer at Kowloon	Olympic towards Tung Chung
Hong Kong Terminus	Airport Express transfer at Kowloon	Tsing Yi towards AsiaWorld–Expo
Transfer at Austin
Nam Cheong towards Tuen Mun	Tuen Ma line transfer at Austin	East Tsim Sha Tsui towards Wu Kai Sha
Track layout
Location

Hong Kong West Kowloon station (abbreviated WEK) is the southern terminus of and the only station on the Hong Kong section of the Guangshengang XRL. The station connects to China's high-speed rail (HSR) network across the border through dedicated tunnels and includes a Mainland Port Area where the laws of (mainland) China are enforced. It was constructed by the MTR Corporation Limited as the project manager commissioned by the Hong Kong Government, through subcontractors.

The station occupies an 11-hectare (27-acre) site, cost HK$12.23 billion to build, and has a total floor area of 430,000 square metres (4,600,000 sq ft).

The station terminal is located in Jordan, Kowloon Peninsula, north of the West Kowloon Cultural District between the Airport Express and Tung Chung line's Kowloon station and the Tuen Ma line's Austin station. The footprint of the new station extends into the underground level of the West Kowloon Cultural District.

As a precaution because of the COVID-19 pandemic, the station was closed between 30 January 2020 and 15 January 2023. Limited service resumed on 15 January 2023, and full service resumed on 1 April 2023.

== Services ==
=== Train services ===
West Kowloon station is served by both short-distance and long-haul train services. Short-distance services consist of frequent services to mainland Chinese cities in neighbouring Guangdong province, including Shenzhen, Dongguan, and Guangzhou, while long-distance services link Hong Kong to major destinations in mainland China. Short-haul trains are operated by both the MTRC (the Vibrant Express) and China Railway, whereas long-haul trains are only operated by China Railway.

In January 2026, the MTR Corporation announced a 26 January service adjustment that added 16 direct destinations in mainland China, bringing the number of direct destinations from West Kowloon to 110. The same timetable adjustment increased the Shanghai Hongqiao sleeper service to daily operation and added services to Guangzhou South.

Both the MTRC and China Railway sell tickets for the other's trains. Ticket prices are set in Renminbi (RMB) which are used by China Railway's ticketing services. The MTRC use only Hong Kong Dollars (HKD) in which fares are set monthly based on China Railway's RMB prices and current conversion rates with the RMB. Seat selection and remaining seat information are not available on MTRC's online ticketing platform.

For all trains terminating at Hong Kong West Kowloon Station, according to the regulations outlined in the "Cross-Boundary Passenger Transport Organization Rules for Guangzhou-Shenzhen-Hong Kong High-Speed Rail," onboard make-up ticket sales to Hong Kong West Kowloon Station are not available. In the event that passengers travel beyond the mainland China-Hong Kong border towards West Kowloon Station without the appropriate ticket, staff at Hong Kong West Kowloon Station will treat them as traveling without a valid ticket. As a result, passengers will be subject to a substantial additional fee based on the "Hong Kong Railway By-Laws."

Although the Express Rail Link has a design capacity of 20 trains per hour in each direction, the capacity is not expected to be fully utilised for some years.

Short-haul services

Preceding station	China Railway High-speed	Following station
Futian Terminus	Guangzhou–Shenzhen–Hong Kong XRL Short-haul service	Terminus
Futian towards Shenzhen North	Guangzhou–Shenzhen–Hong Kong XRL Short-haul service	Terminus
Futian towards Guangzhou South	Guangzhou–Shenzhen–Hong Kong XRL Short-haul service	Terminus
Futian towards Guangzhou East	Guangzhou–Shenzhen–Hong Kong XRL Short-haul service	Terminus

Long-haul services

Preceding station	China Railway High-speed	Following station
Shenzhen North towards Beijing West	Guangzhou–Shenzhen–Hong Kong XRL Long-haul service	Terminus
Shenzhen North towards Changsha South	Guangzhou–Shenzhen–Hong Kong XRL Long-haul service	Terminus
Shenzhen North towards Chengdu East	Guangzhou–Shenzhen–Hong Kong XRL Long-haul service	Terminus
Shenzhen North towards Chongqing West	Guangzhou–Shenzhen–Hong Kong XRL Long-haul service	Terminus
Shenzhen North towards Fuzhou	Guangzhou–Shenzhen–Hong Kong XRL Long-haul service	Terminus
Futian towards Meizhou West	Guangzhou–Shenzhen–Hong Kong XRL Long-haul service	Terminus
Shenzhen North towards Kunming South	Guangzhou–Shenzhen–Hong Kong XRL Long-haul service	Terminus
Shenzhen North towards Nanning East	Guangzhou–Shenzhen–Hong Kong XRL Long-haul service	Terminus
Shenzhen North towards Shanghai Hongqiao	Guangzhou–Shenzhen–Hong Kong XRL Long-haul service	Terminus
Futian towards Shantou	Guangzhou–Shenzhen–Hong Kong XRL Long-haul service	Terminus
Futian towards Shanwei	Guangzhou–Shenzhen–Hong Kong XRL Long-haul service	Terminus
Shenzhen North towards Tianjin West	Guangzhou–Shenzhen–Hong Kong XRL Long-haul service	Terminus
Futian towards Wuhan	Guangzhou–Shenzhen–Hong Kong XRL Long-haul service	Terminus
Shenzhen North towards Xiamen	Guangzhou–Shenzhen–Hong Kong XRL Long-haul service	Terminus
Shenzhen North towards Xi'an North	Guangzhou–Shenzhen–Hong Kong XRL Long-haul service	Terminus
Shenzhen North towards Zhangjiajie West	Guangzhou–Shenzhen–Hong Kong XRL Long-haul service	Terminus
Shenzhen North towards Zhanjiang West	Guangzhou–Shenzhen–Hong Kong XRL Long-haul service	Terminus
Futian towards Zhaoqing East	Guangzhou–Shenzhen–Hong Kong XRL Long-haul service	Terminus

=== Ground transport ===
Related developments by the Hong Kong Government in West Kowloon, expect to improve the efficiency of road and pedestrian access routes, as well as to resolve a problematic traffic intersection in West Kowloon. These road developments hope to meet the transport needs of the entire area of the new development area of West Kowloon Cultural District and West Kowloon station after completion.

Transportation Study identified the following specific road improvement measures:

- Build a connection from Austin Road West (near Canton Road) to Lin Cheung Road (Jordan Road north) via an underground carriageway, so that pedestrians will have unimpeded access and egress between West Kowloon Cultural District, West Kowloon station and Kowloon station
- Conduct Austin Road and Canton Road junction improvement works, including considering the widening of the Canton Road carriageway and expansion of the existing underground pedestrian tunnel system
- Other road improvement projects in West Kowloon will be directly connected to a newly developed area near the West Kowloon Highway, in order to reduce the load on the region's transport network

== Structure ==
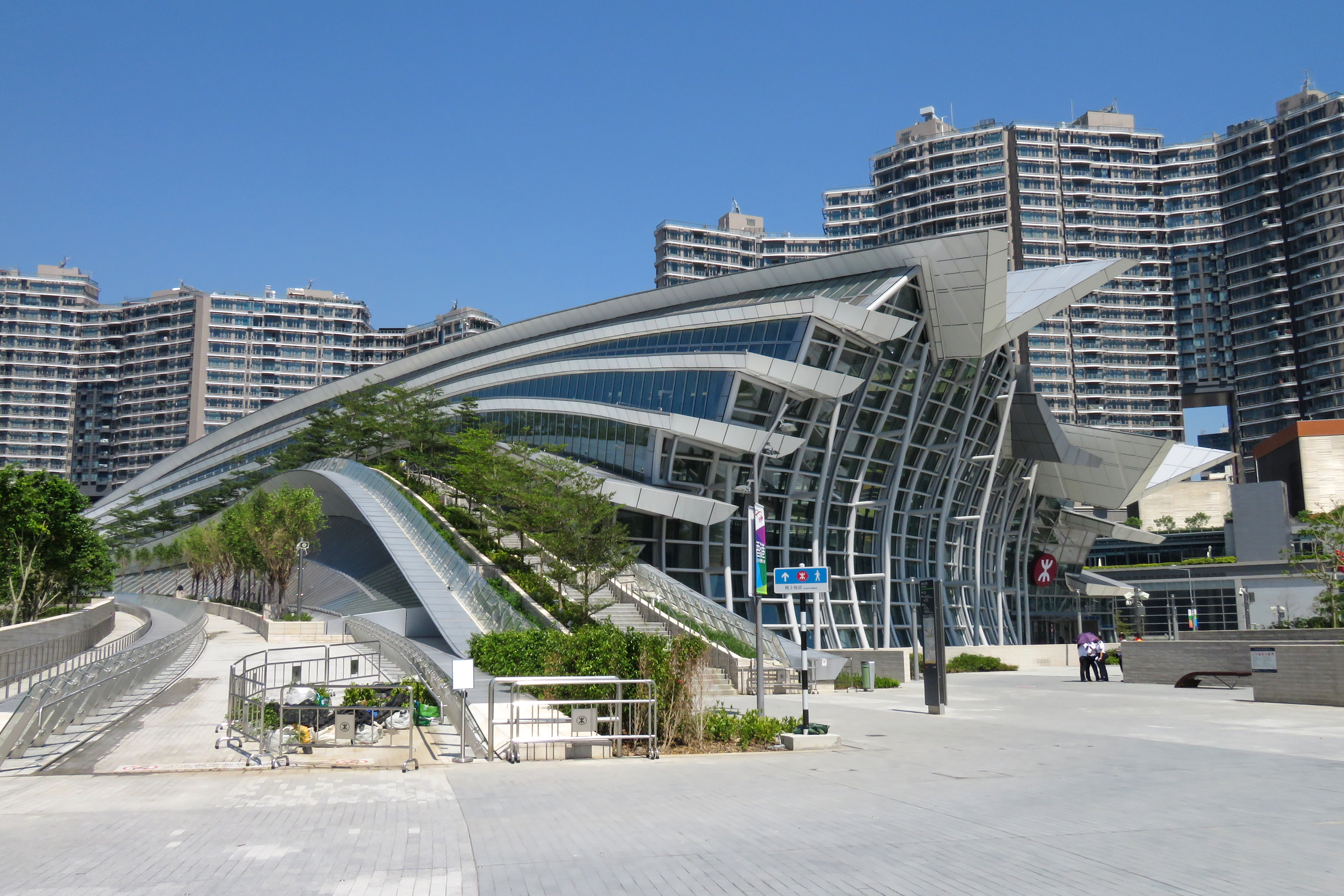
Hong Kong West Kowloon Station front entrance (2018)

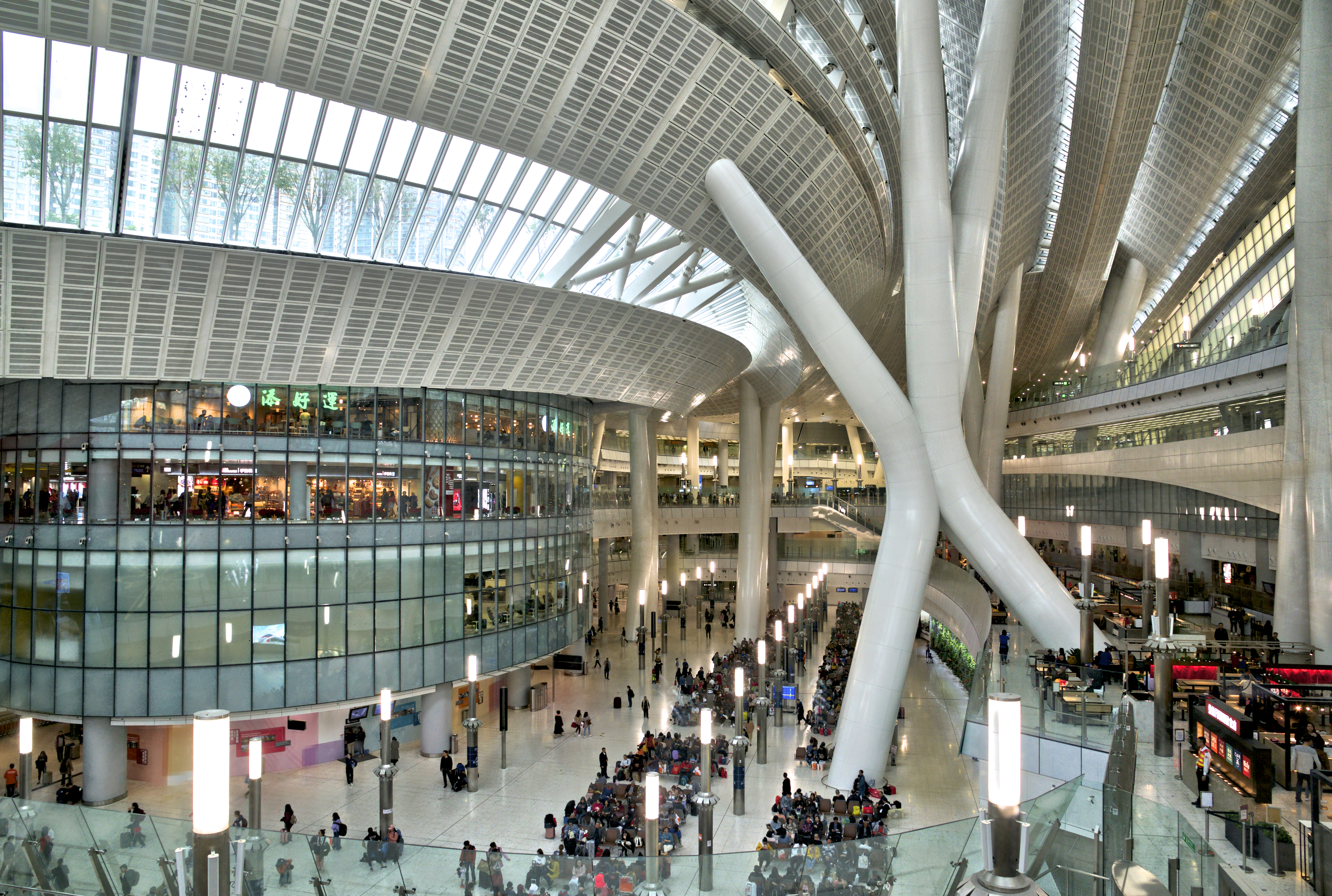
Interior of the station

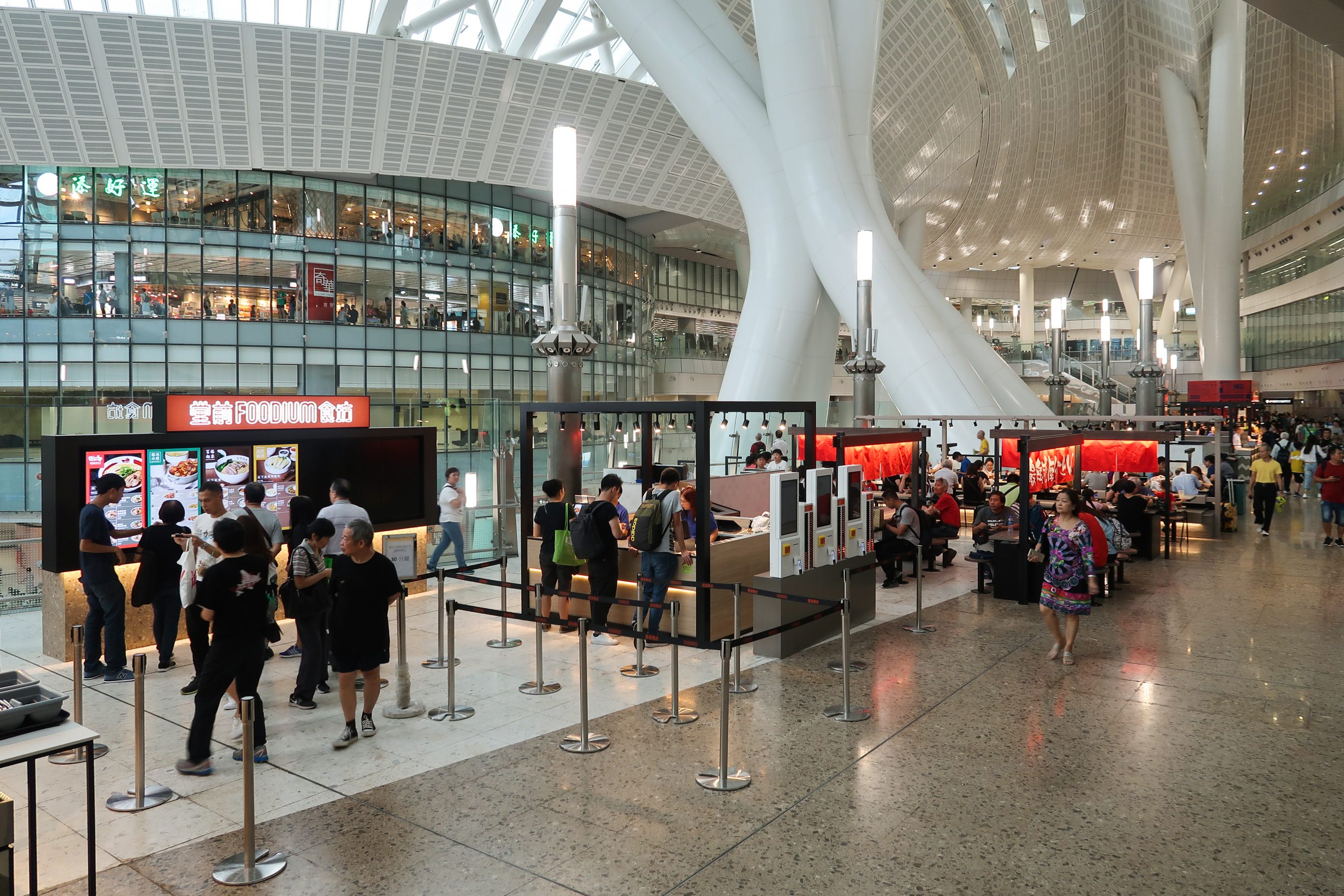
Restaurant area on the station level B2

Construction of the West Kowloon station project was divided into two parts, XRL810A (northern part) and XRL810B (southern part) (XRL meaning eXpress Rail Link). The northern construction area was awarded to Leighton Contractors & Gammon Construction responsible for joint operations. The southern part of the project was awarded to a consortium of Laing O'Rourke, HCCG (Hsin Chong) & Paul Y jointly responsible for the construction.

As a cross-border station, the West Kowloon station has customs and immigration facilities for passengers to go through prior to boarding, removing the need for trains to stop at the Hong Kong-mainland China border, reducing travel time.

=== Platforms ===
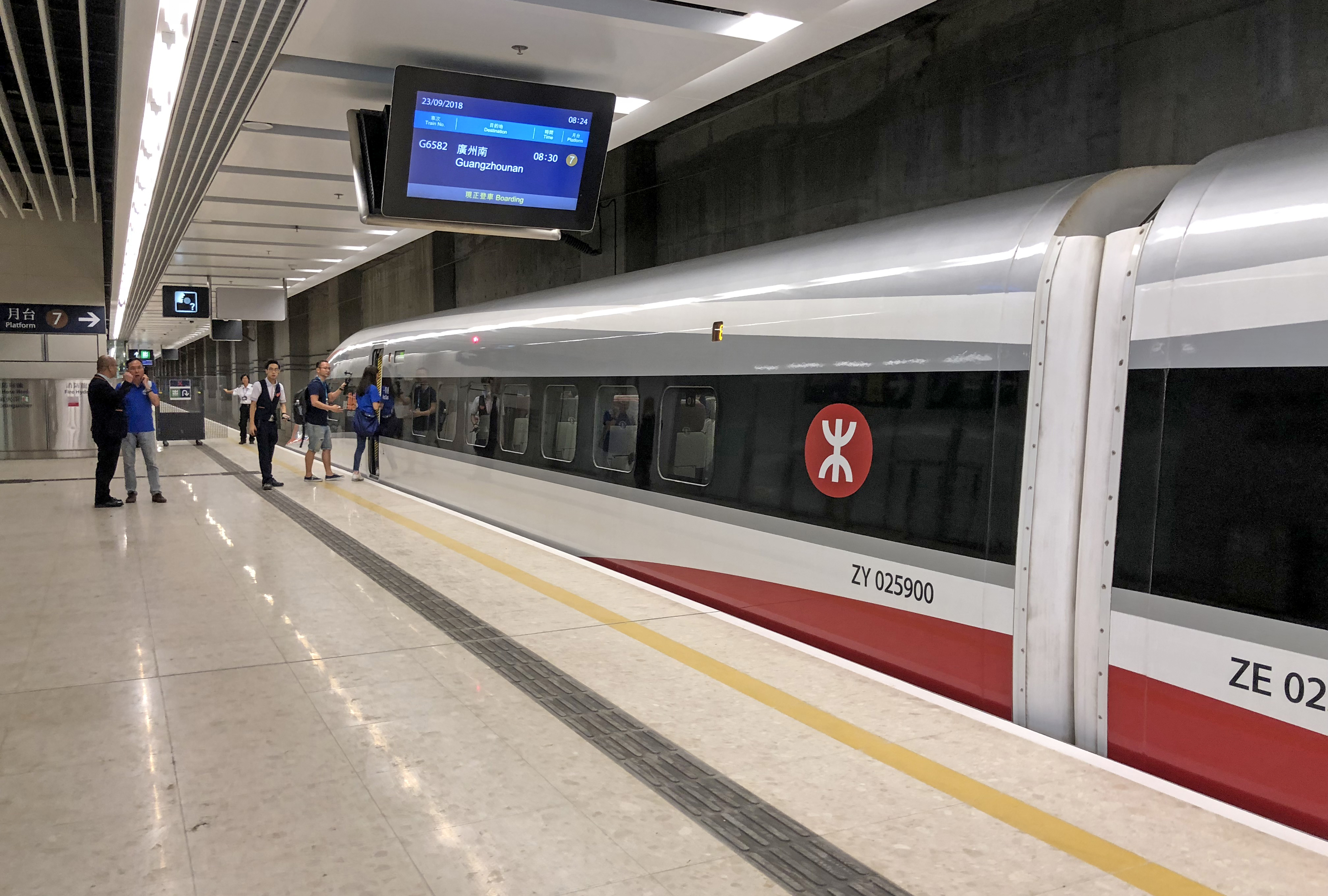
Train G6582 at Platform 7 on the first-day operation of Hong Kong West Kowloon station

The station serves both 16-car long-haul trains and shorter 8-car short-haul regional trains. As of July 2025, the station uses only 10 tracks (6 long-haul and 4 short-haul) with 14 platforms (6 long-haul and 4 short-haul) consisting of 5 island platforms and 4 side platforms. However, the station was designed with 15 tracks (9 long-haul and 6 short-haul) with 21 platforms (9 long-haul and 12 short-haul) using 9 island platforms and 3 side platforms for full operations.

The long-haul trains use longer platforms located on the eastern end of the station. This part of the station has 9 tracks with 4 island platforms and 1 side platform. However, as of 2022, it has only ever used 6 tracks with 2 side platforms and 2 island platforms (Platforms 4–9). Passengers here board and alight from the same platform. Each platform here has 4 lifts and 4 escalators (2 for arrivals and 2 for departures). This means an island platform has a total of 8 escalators and 8 lifts. The arrivals escalators and lifts connect to the Arrival concourse on B2 and the departures connecting from the Departure concourse on B3.

Short-haul trains (including MTRC's Vibrant Express) use shorter platforms which employ the Spanish solution arrangement, where platforms for boarding and alighting are separately located on opposing sides of the track. This reduces dwell times of trains in the station by reducing boarding and alighting times of passengers to allow for a higher frequency of service. Currently, there are only 4 tracks in use for the short-haul trains, with 3 island platforms (2 of which are used for alighting) and 2 side platforms with a total of 8 platforms (Platforms 11–18). The boarding platforms (both island and side) each use 3 lifts and 2 lifts. The alighting platforms each use 2 lifts and 3 escalators. In the future, there will be a total of 6 tracks (5 island platforms and 2 side platforms) serving short-haul trains.

←	Track 1	16-car train (Not in service)
	Platform /	Island platform (Not in service)
←	Track 2	16-car train (Not in service)
←	Track 3	16-car train (Not in service)
	Platform /	Island platform (Platform 3 not in service)
←	Track 4	16-car train
←	Track 5	16-car train
	Platform /	Island platform
←	Track 6	16-car train
←	Track 7	16-car train
	Platform /	Island platform
←	Track 8	16-car train
←	Track 9	16-car train
	Platform	Side platform
	Platform	Side platform (Boarding only)
←	Track 10	8-car train
	Platform /	Island platform (Alighting only)
←	Track 11	8-car train
	Platform /	Island platform (Boarding only)
←	Track 12	8-car train
	Platform /	Island platform (Alighting only)
←	Track 13	8-car train
	Platform /	Island platform (Boarding only, Platform 19 not in service)
←	Track 14	8-car train (Not in service)
	Platform /	Island platform (Not in service)
←	Track 15	8-car train (Not in service)
	Platform	Side platform (Not in service)

=== Exits ===
Exit	Sign	Image	Sign Indicating surrounding places	Floor
A (Upper Exit)	Austin Station		Tuen Ma Line Austin Station Exit C, China Hong Kong City and Harbour City	B1
A (Bottom Exit)	Austin Station		Tuen Ma Line Austin Station Exit C, China Hong Kong City and Harbour City	B2
B1	Wui Man Road Pick-up/Drop-off		Wui Man Road Pick-up/Drop-off	G (ground floor)
B2	Wui Man Road Pick-up/Drop-off		Wui Man Road Pick-up/Drop-off	G (ground floor)
B3	Wui Man Road Pick-up/Drop-off		Wui Man Road Pick-up/Drop-off	G (ground floor)
C	Lin Cheung Road		Lin Cheung Road	G (ground floor) (via lift and B3M tunnel)
D1	Green Plaza		Green Plaza	G (ground floor)
F	Green Plaza		Green Plaza	G (ground floor)
G	Xiqu Centre		China Ferry Terminal	B2
H	Green Plaza		Green Plaza	G (ground floor)
J1	Coach Pick-up/Drop-off		Coach Pick-up/Drop-off	G (ground floor)
J2	Coach Pick-up/Drop-off		Coach Pick-up/Drop-off	G (ground floor)
J3	Coach Pick-up/Drop-off		Coach Pick-up/Drop-off	G (ground floor)
K1	Austin station		Austin Station Exit B4 and Jordan Road	L1 Footbridge
K2	West Kowloon Station Bus Terminus		Bus terminal roof garden	L1 Footbridge
K4	Sky Corridor		Sky Corridor and Observatory	L1 to L2 stair and slope
L	International Gateway Centre (IGC)		International Gateway Centre (IGC) ONE IGC (Ping An Tower) THREE IGC (UBS Tower)	L1 Footbridge
M	ELEMENTS		ELEMENTS and Kowloon Station	L1 Footbridge
N	Austin station		Austin station Exit D4, Austin Road Cross-border bus terminal	L1 Footbridge
Exits	Taxi station drop-off		Taxi station drop-off	B1
Exits	Taxi station pick-up		Taxi station pick-up	B2
Exits	Station car park		Station car park	B2
: Wheelchair access

=== Landscaping ===
West Kowloon station features an extensive green garden across the roof area of the station. It also sets up a large collection of cultural elements and entertainment spaces. Passengers can easily cross the ground floor between Kowloon station, Austin station and West Kowloon Cultural District, providing Hong Kong residents and visitors ample public open space and a comfortable green walking environment. Above the station, an area of approximately 8,900 square metres (96,000 sq ft) has been planted with a large number of plants and trees with traffic separated. All to create a pedestrian area, a green platform, and a wooded park that will integrate with the West Kowloon Cultural District harbourside parklands.

In addition, the West Kowloon station entrance lobby area features a green ecological leisure channel zone to tie in with the greenery on top of the building.

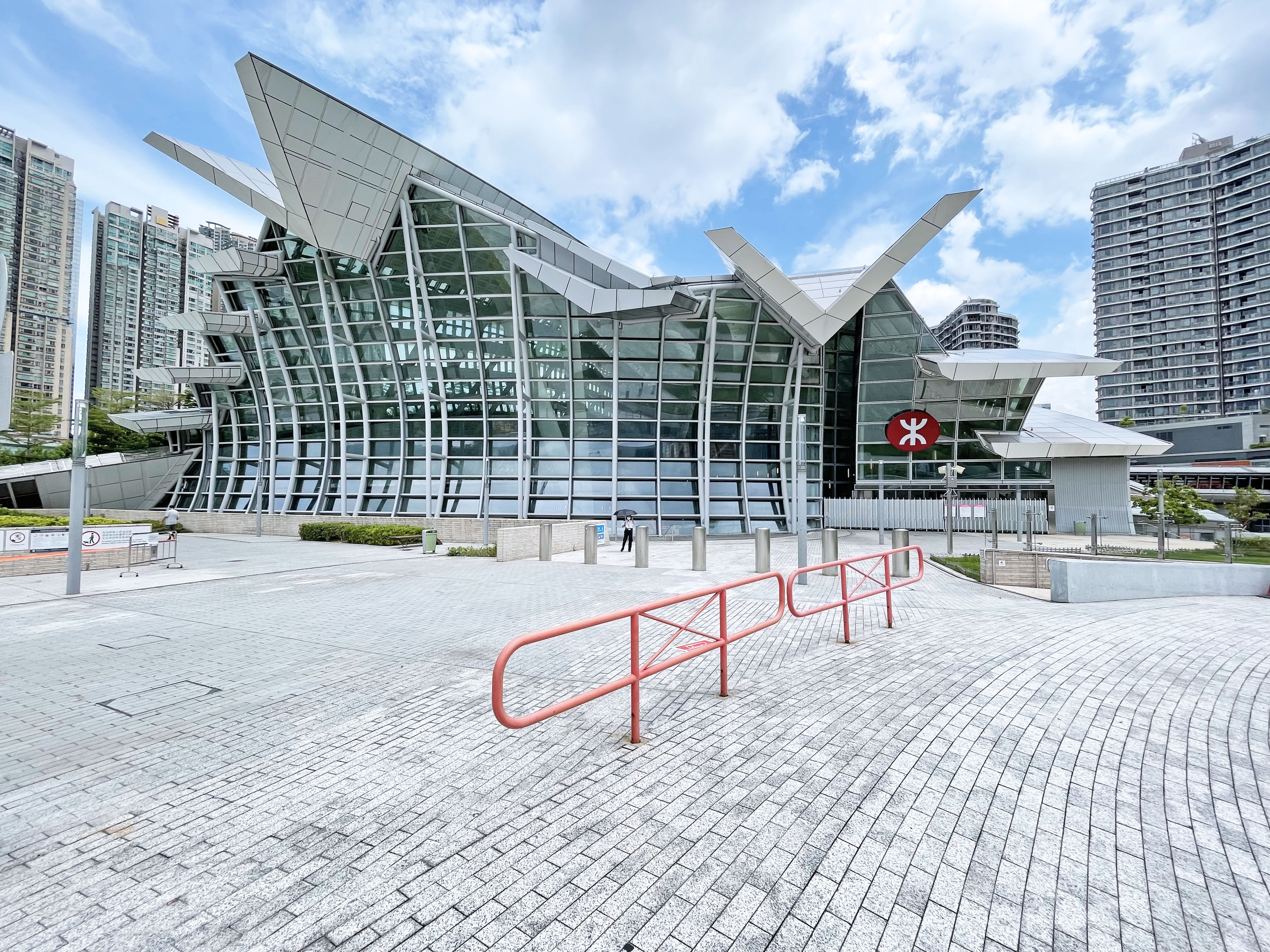
Station west side landscaping

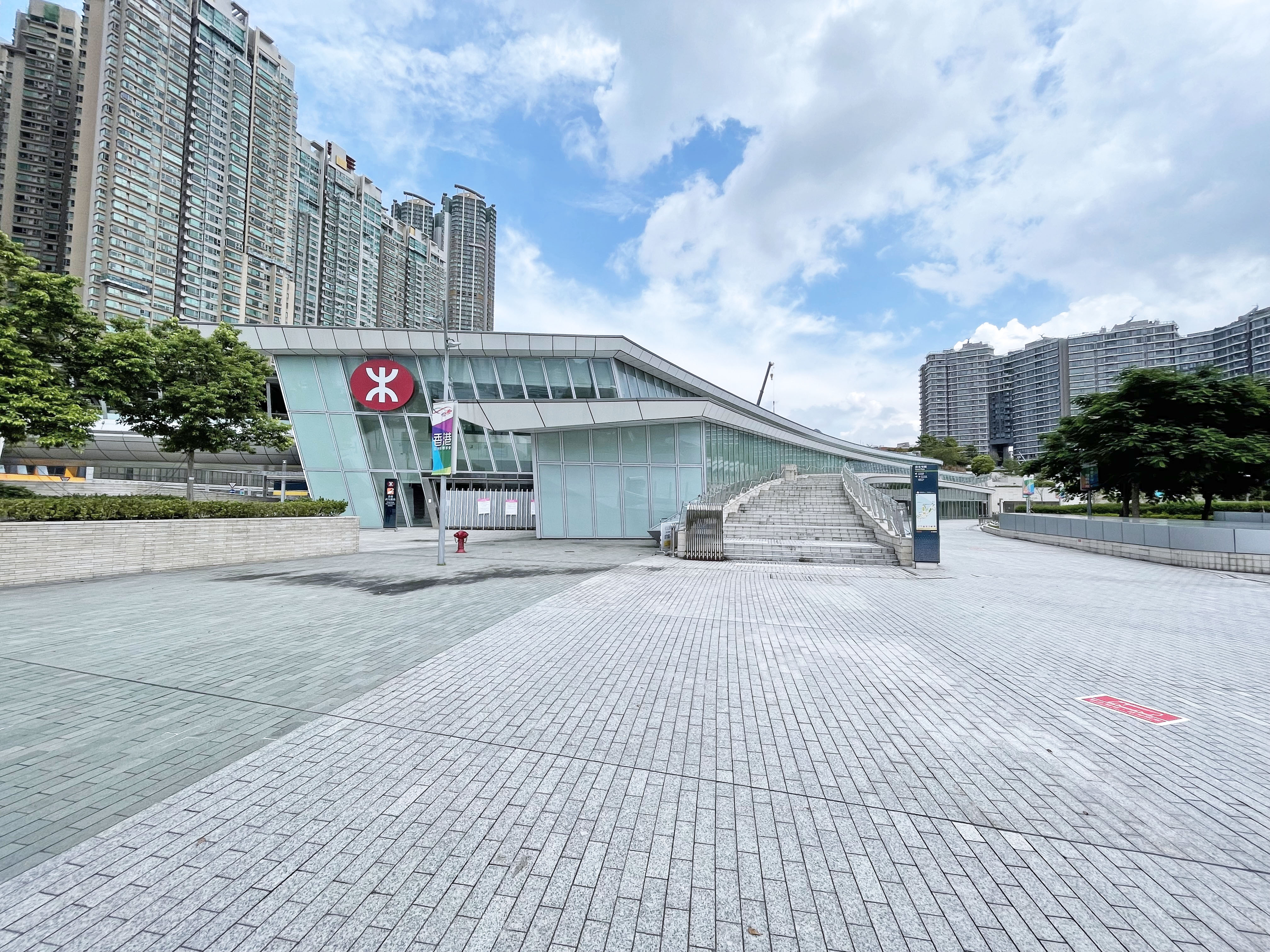
Station east side landscaping

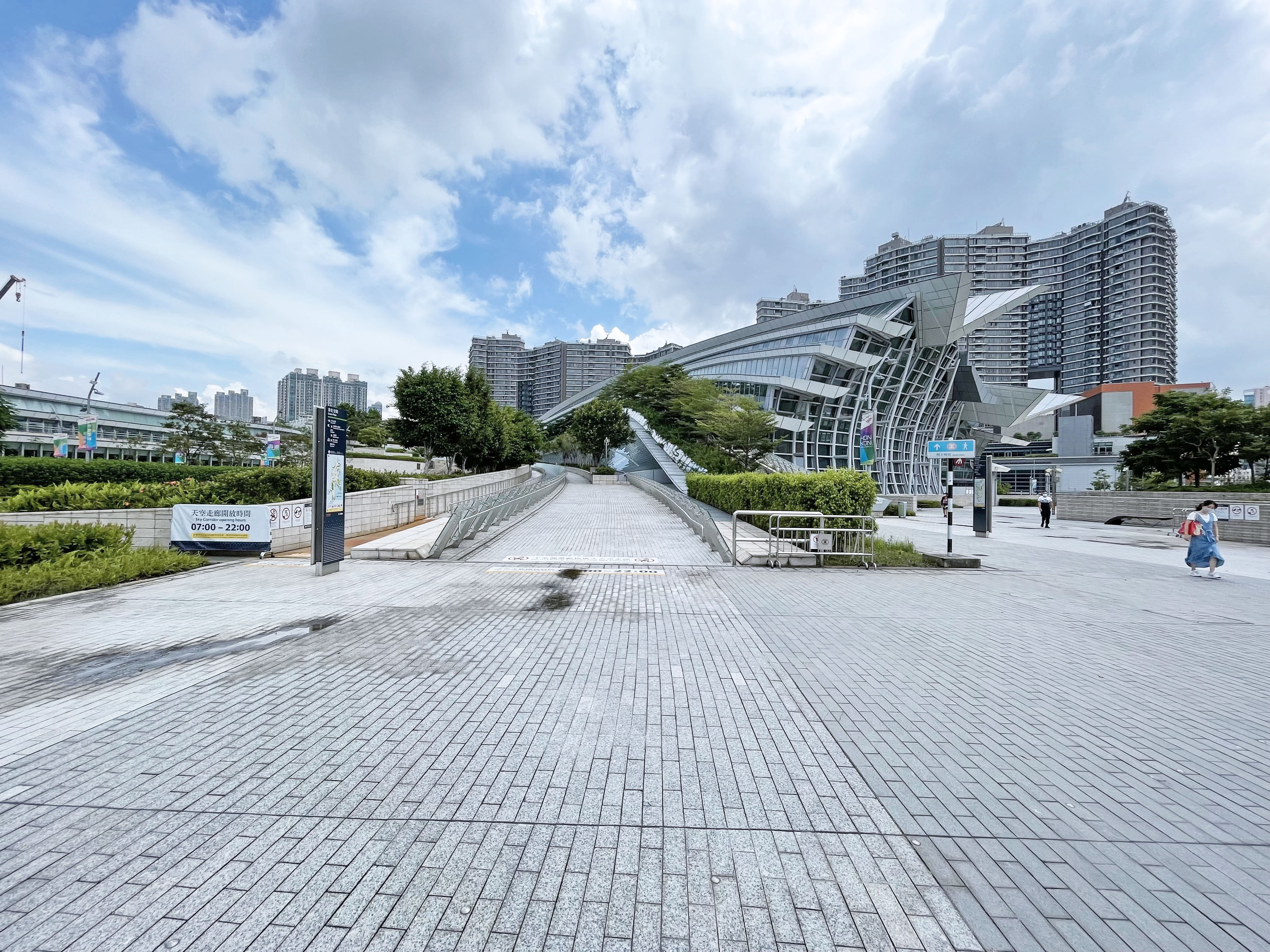
Station terrace

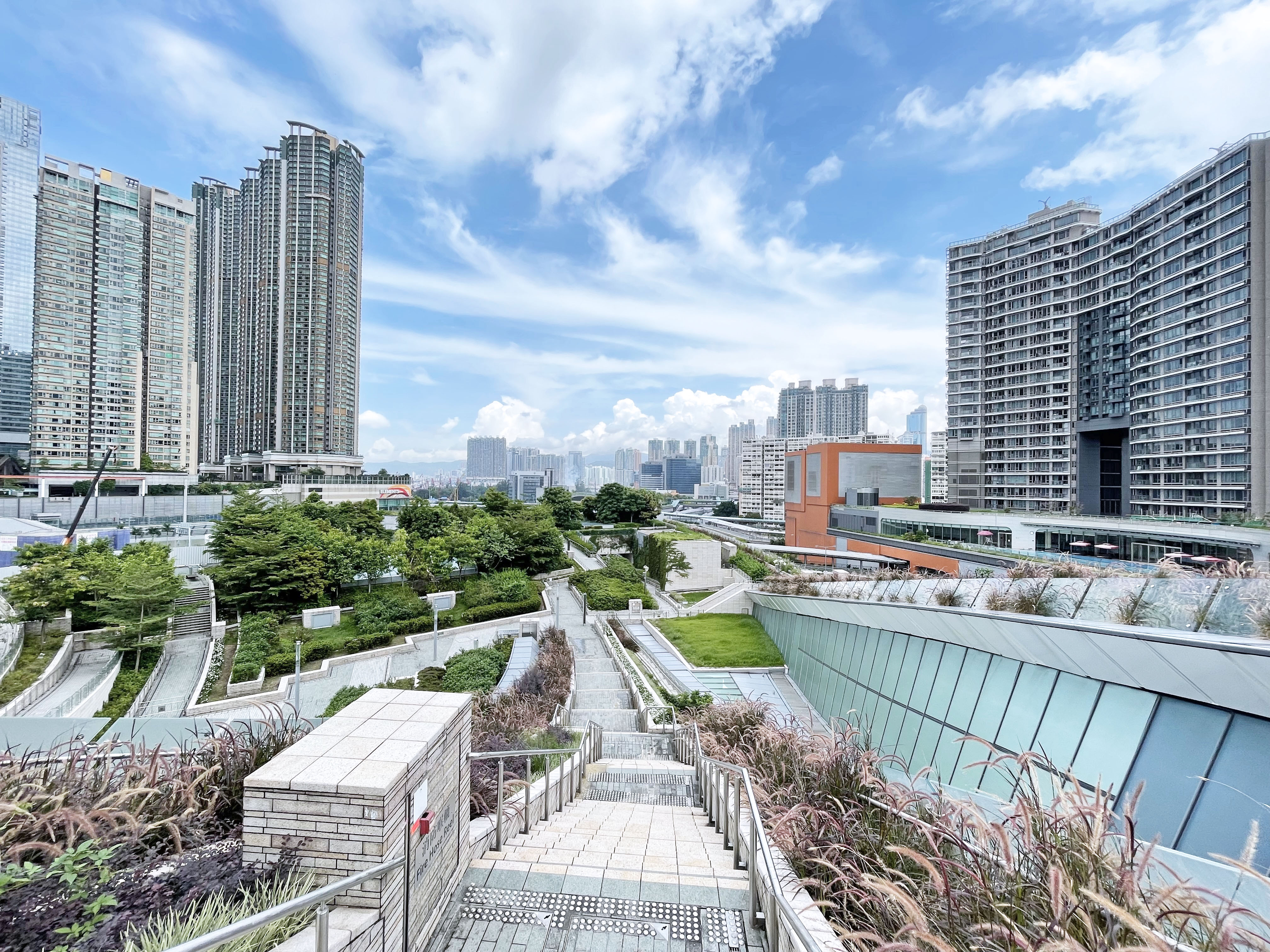
Station park

== History and development ==
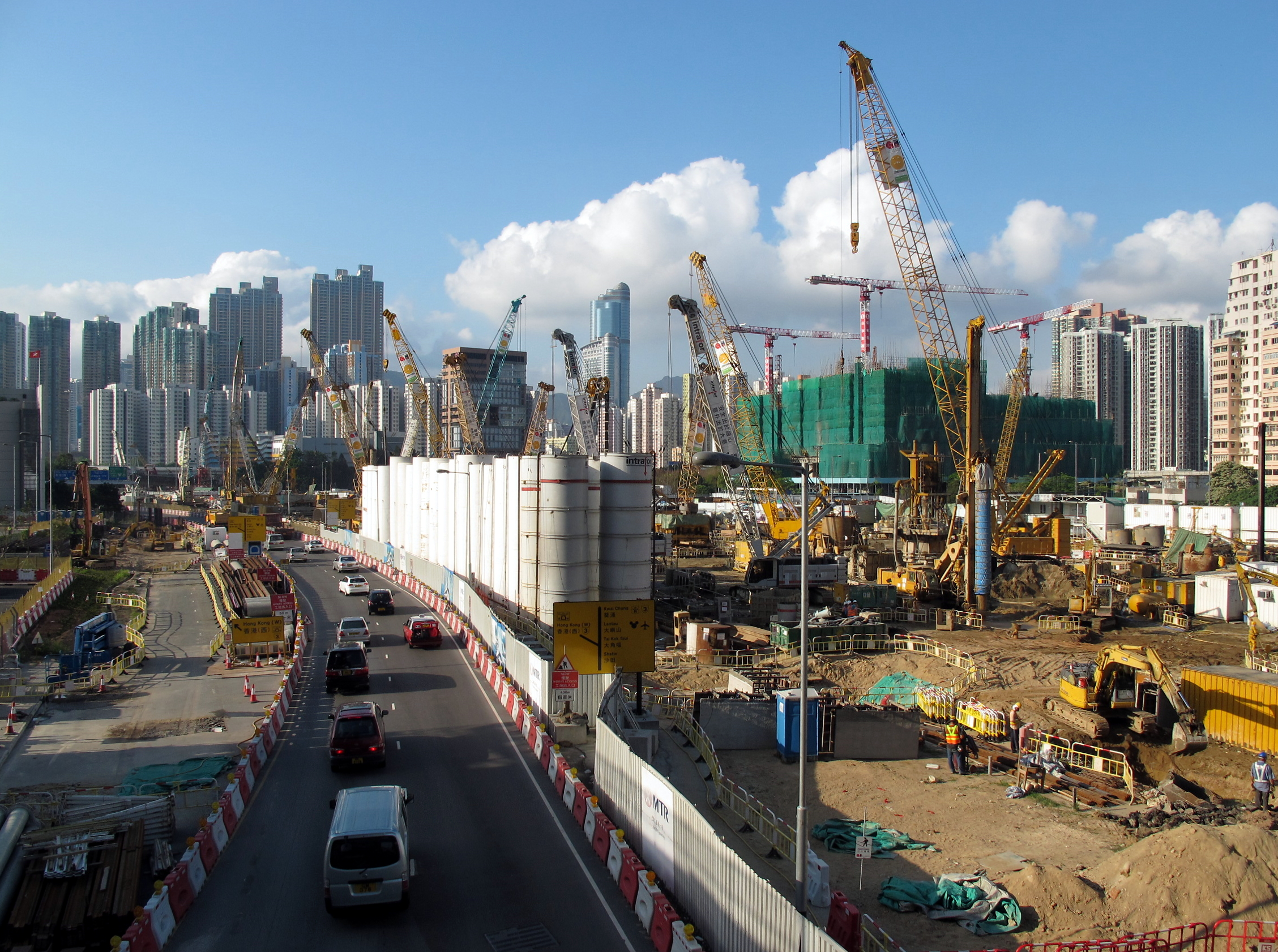
Construction site in 2011

The original scheduled opening date of 2012 was delayed until 2015 following the shake-up of high-speed rail construction across China after the 2011 Wenzhou train collision. While construction of the station was still planned for completion in 2015, major flooding occurred in the railway tunnels under construction on 30 March 2014. This resulted in great damage to the tunnel boring machines. Internal MTR reports suggested causes were incomplete tender drawings, site surveys, and planning before construction began. The station was formally opened on 4 September 2018 and high-speed trains started to run to destinations in mainland China from 23 September 2018.

RTHK reported that the final cost of the construction was 30% more than the initial estimate.

Due to the COVID-19 pandemic, then Chief Executive of the territory Carrie Lam announced that West Kowloon station would be closed from midnight of 30 January 2020 until further notice. The station had since then remained closed to the public, although it was used on 30 June and 1 July 2022 to facilitate Chinese leader Xi Jinping and first lady Peng Liyuan's visit to Hong Kong for ceremonies related to 25th anniversary of the Hong Kong handover and inauguration of John Lee as the new Chief Executive.

The station reopened on 15 January 2023.

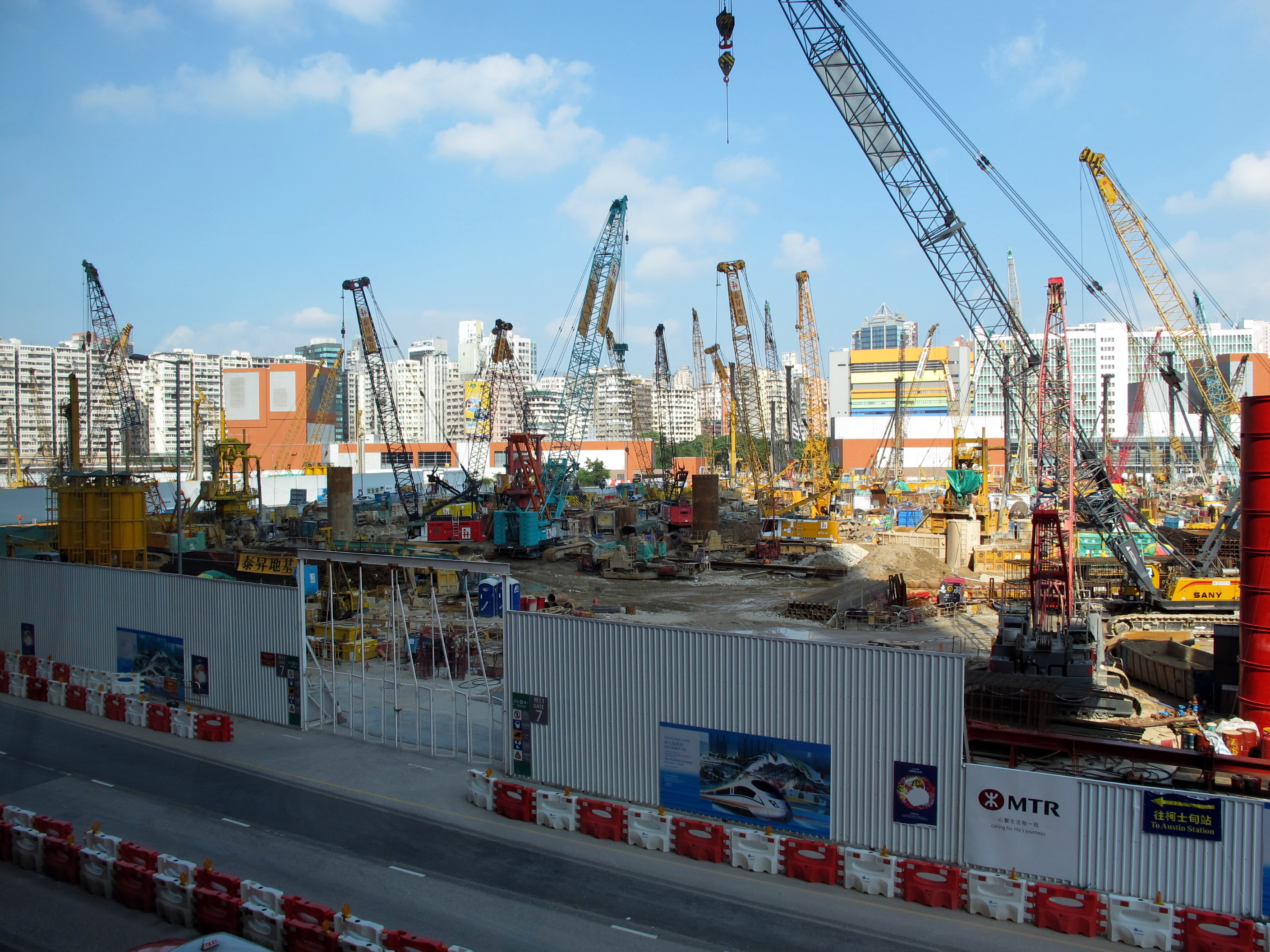
View of the construction site in 2010

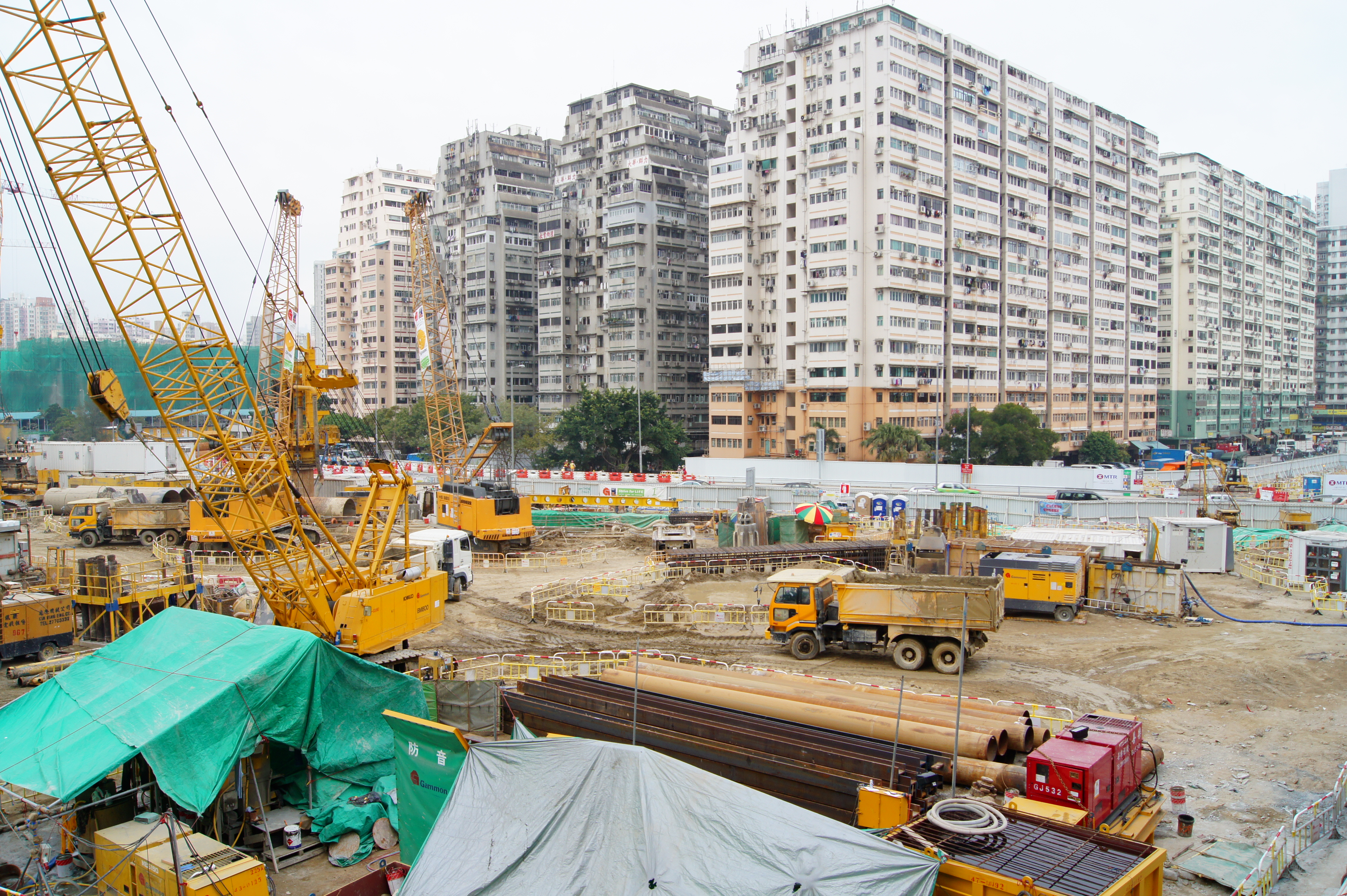
View of the construction site in 2011

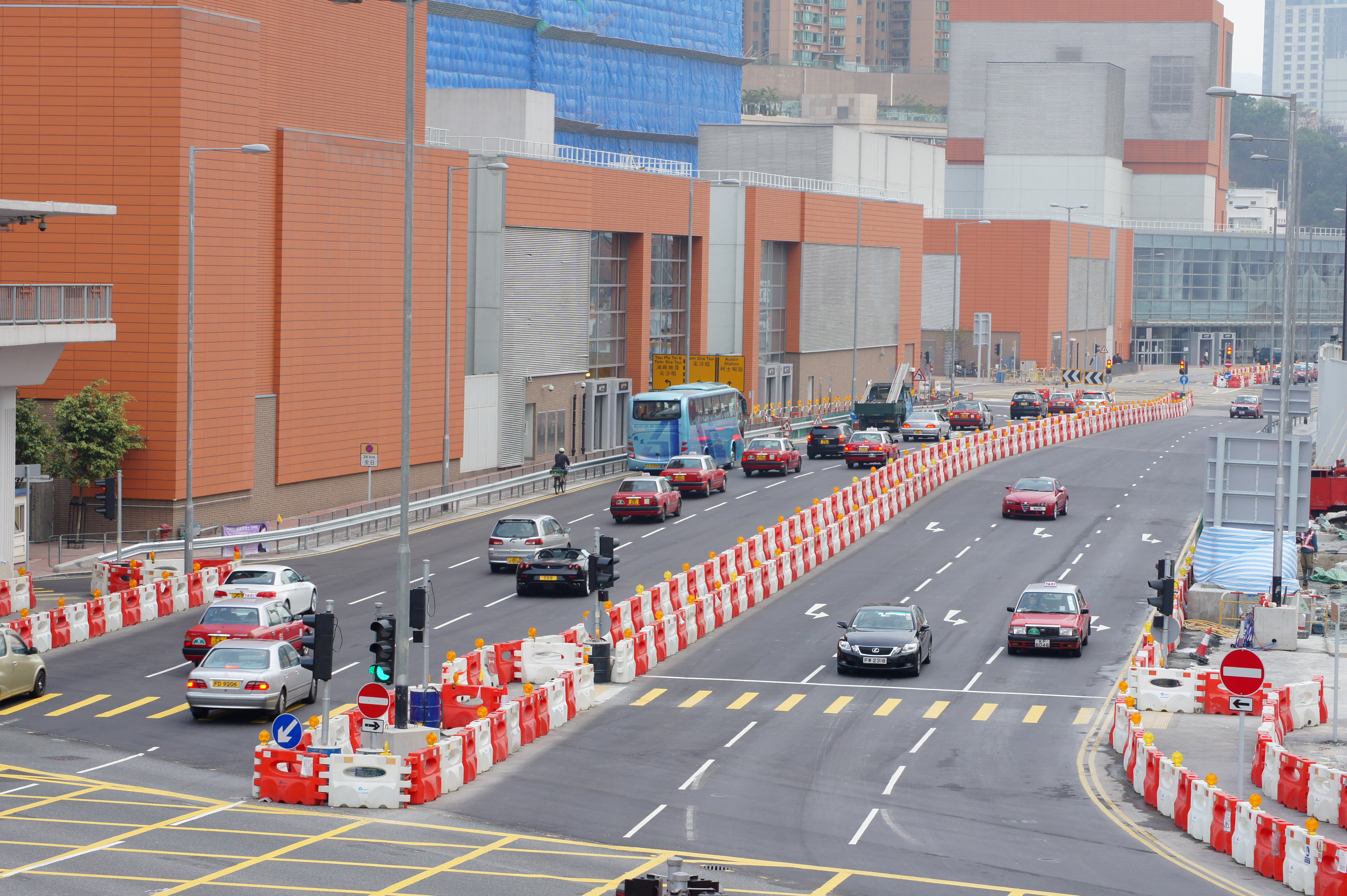
Temporary roadworks along D1A (South) in 2011

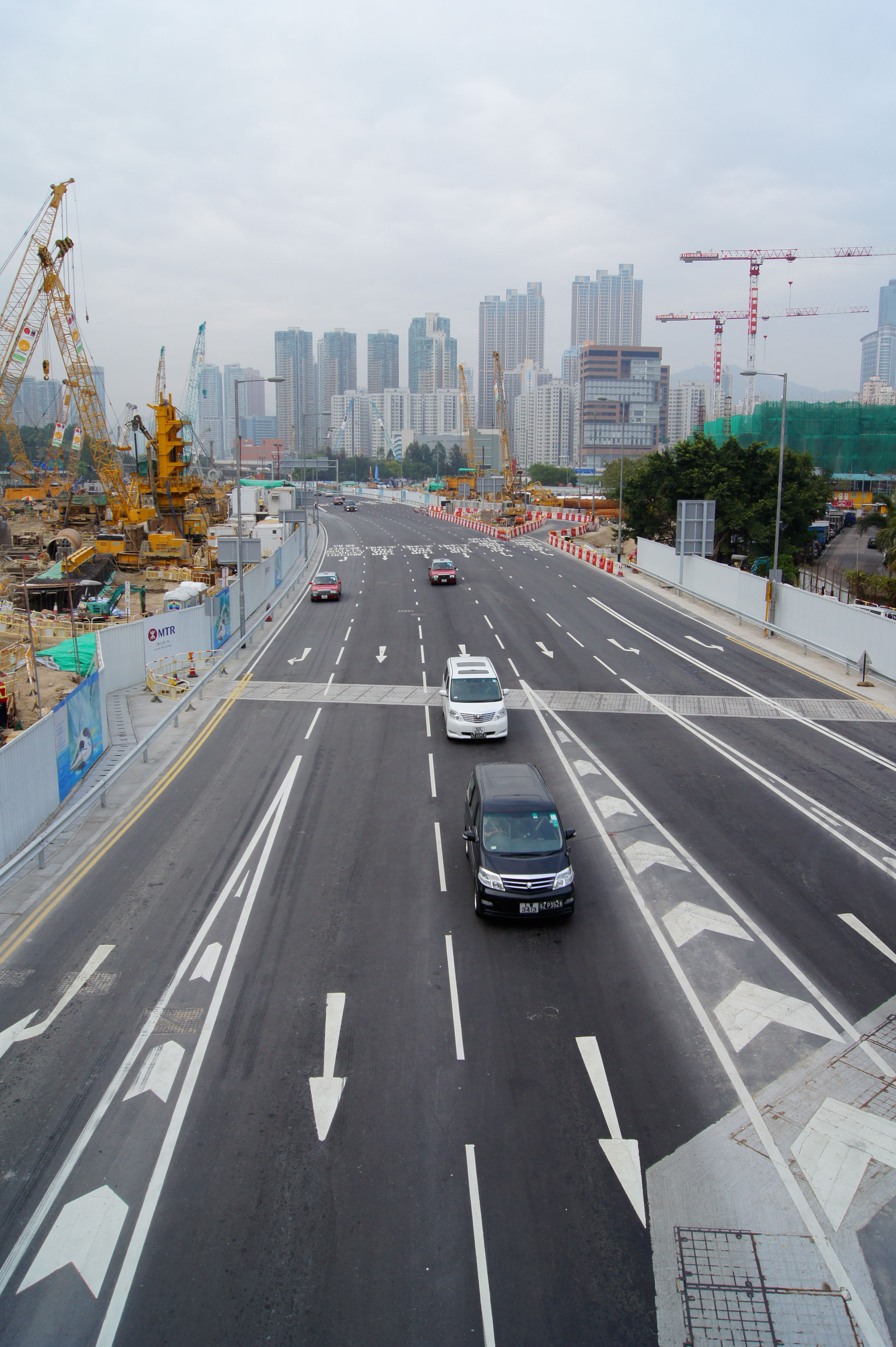
Temporary roadworks along D1A (North) in 2011

== Mainland Port Area ==
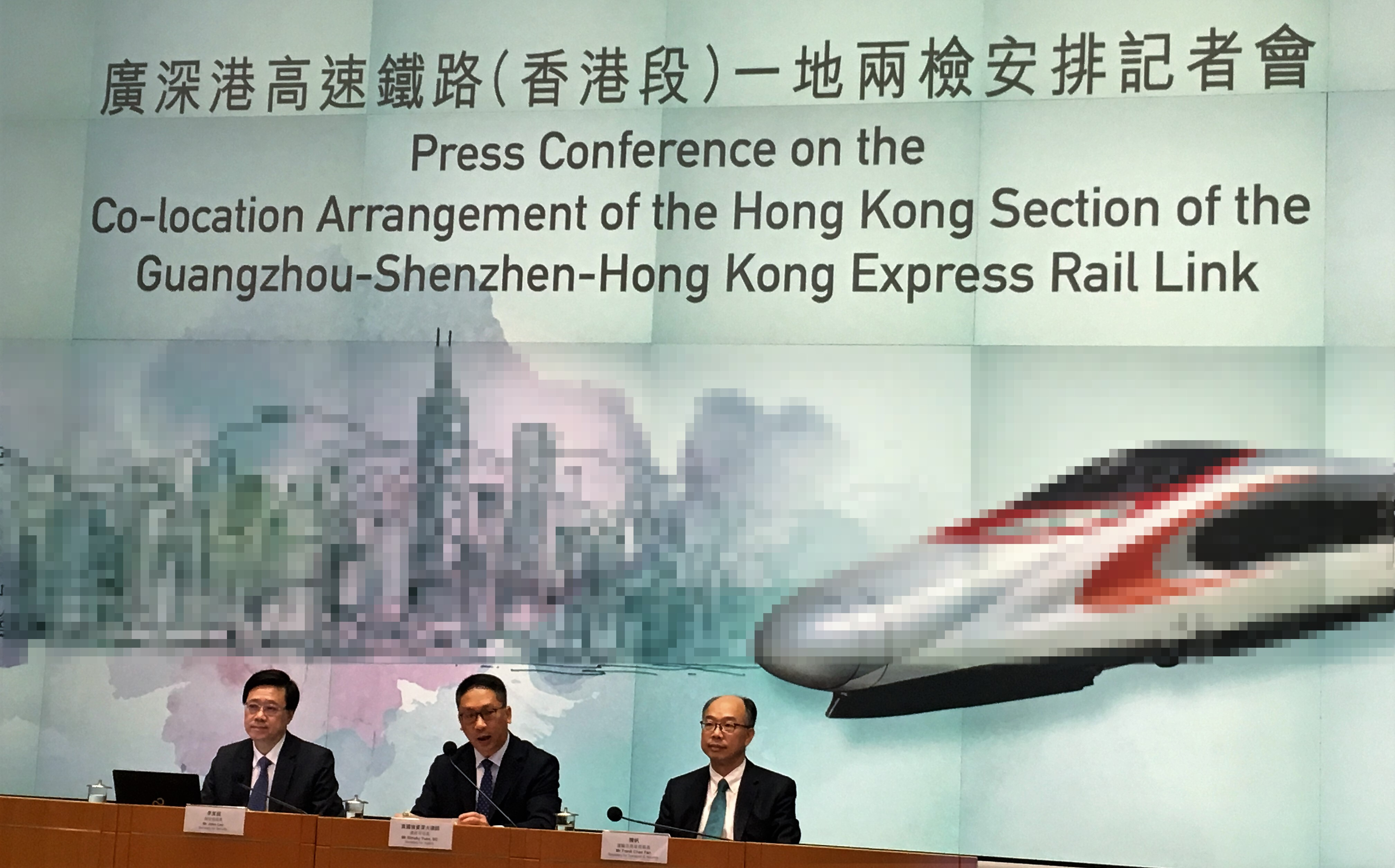
The Government announced the implementation of co-location arrangement on 25 July 2017.

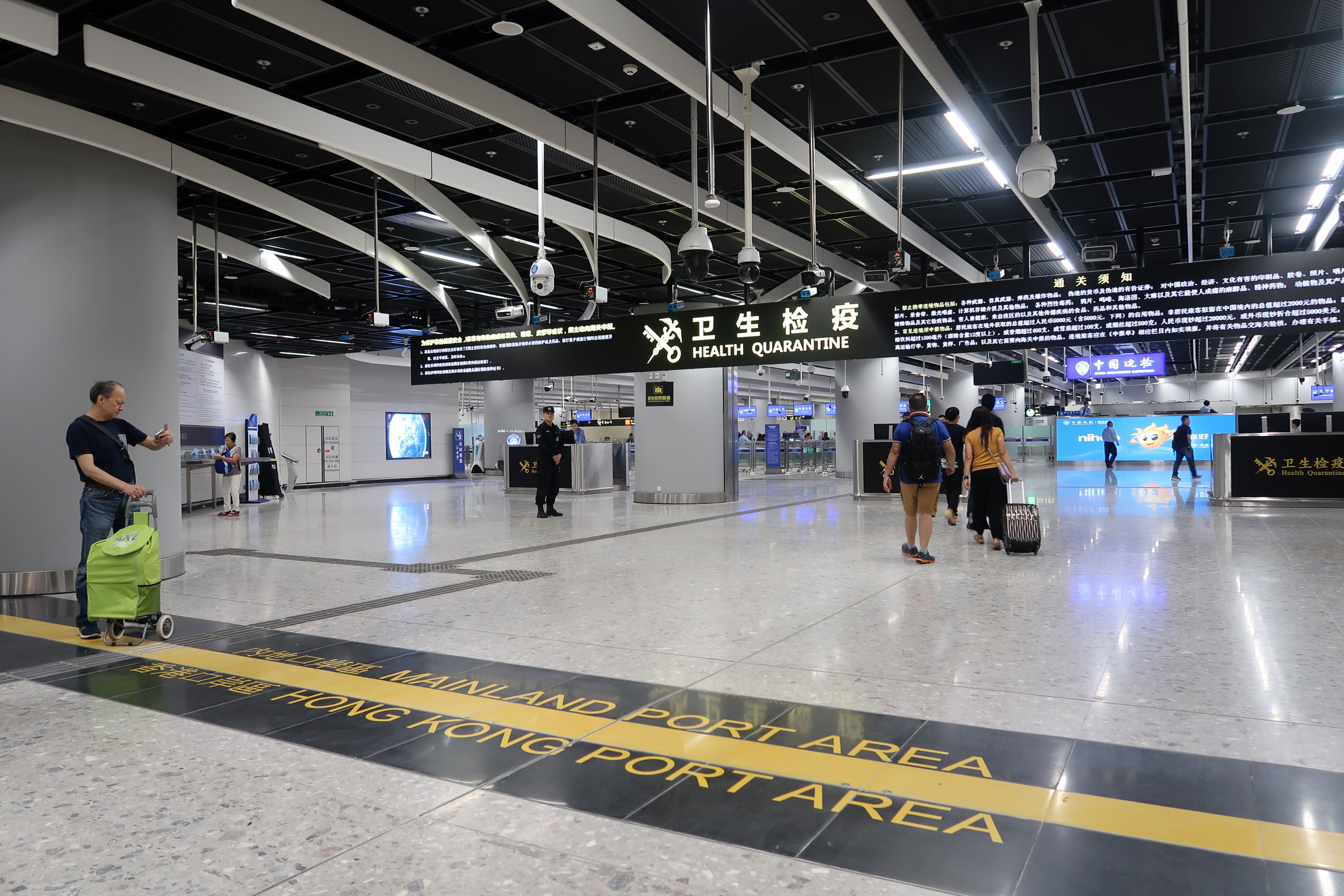
Entrance of the Mainland Port Area

The Mainland Port Area is an area inside West Kowloon station that serves as a border control point between mainland China and Hong Kong. The area has been effectively ceded to mainland China for a token HK$1,000 a year in rent. Since September 2018, mainland Chinese immigration and police personnel operate exclusively within the area, and the laws of mainland China, rather than Hong Kong, are enforced.

This arrangement was controversial both before and after its implementation, particularly amongst members of the pan-democratic and localist political camps. The Hong Kong Bar Association stated that the arrangement would "severely undermine" confidence in the rule of law in Hong Kong. Additionally, some people opposed the building of the rail link in the first place in 2009-2010.

=== Area definition ===
The area delineated and coloured orange on Plan No. 1 and Annex 1 to Plan No. 1 in Schedule 2 of the Guangzhou-Shenzhen-Hong Kong Express Rail Link (Co-location) Ordinance is declared as the Mainland Port Area. It comprises the China Customs and National Immigration Administration checkpoints on B2 and B3 levels, the platform areas on B4 level, and the passageways connecting them. A train compartment of a passenger train in operation on the Hong Kong Section of the Express Rail Link is to be regarded as part of the Mainland Port Area. This arrangement will facilitate mainland border control preclearance in Hong Kong. Reports in the British press suggested this area amounts to a cession of 1,000,000 square feet (93,000 m^{2}) of the station for a token annual rent of HK$ 1,000 (reported as being equivalent to £99).

Except for reserved matters, the Mainland Port Area is to be regarded as an area lying outside Hong Kong but lying within mainland China for the purposes of the application of the laws of mainland China, and of the laws of Hong Kong, in the Mainland Port Area; and the delineation of jurisdiction over the Mainland Port Area. It does not affect the boundary of the administrative division of the Hong Kong Special Administrative Region.

Although the West Kowloon HSR station is listed on a page titled by the Shenzhen municipal government online, it is unclear whether this qualifies as a Port of Exit for the Shenzhen SEZ Visa on Arrival.

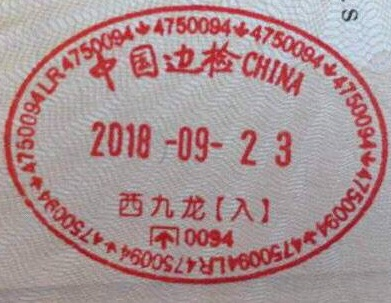
Entry stamp issued at juxtaposed controls at Hong Kong West Kowloon railway station

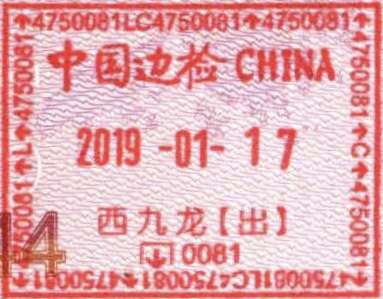
Exit stamp issued at juxtaposed controls at Hong Kong West Kowloon railway station on a Chinese passport

=== Implementation process ===
The joint meeting on 8 August 2017 of the Panel on Transport, the Panel on Security and the Panel on Administration of Justice and Legal Services of the Legislative Council passed the motion supporting the implementation of the "co-location arrangement" at the West Kowloon station.

The meeting on 15 November 2017 of the Legislative Council passed the motion on taking forward the follow-up tasks of the co-location arrangement at the West Kowloon station.

The Government of the Hong Kong Special Administrative Region signed the Co-operation Arrangement between the Mainland and the Hong Kong Special Administrative Region on the Establishment of the Port at the West Kowloon Station of the Guangzhou-Shenzhen-Hong Kong Express Rail Link for Implementing Co-location Arrangement with the People's Government of Guangdong Province on 18 November 2017.

On 27 December 2017, the Standing Committee of the National People's Congress approved the Co-operation Arrangement and stated that it is consistent with the Constitution of China and the Basic Law of the Hong Kong Special Administrative Region.

The Guangzhou–Shenzhen–Hong Kong Express Rail Link (Co-location) Bill was passed by the Legislative Council at the meeting on 14 June 2018. The Ordinance gazetted on 22 June 2018 and come into operation on a day to be appointed by the Secretary for Transport and Housing by notice published in the Hong Kong Government Gazette.

In the Court of First Instance of the High Court, Judge Anderson Chow refused the applications for leave to apply for judicial review by his decision dated 27 September 2017 and 18 April 2018. He refused the applications for interim relief by his decision dated 14 August 2018. He granted the applications for leave to apply for judicial review but dismissed the substantive applications for judicial review by his judgment dated 13 December 2018.

=== Police station ===
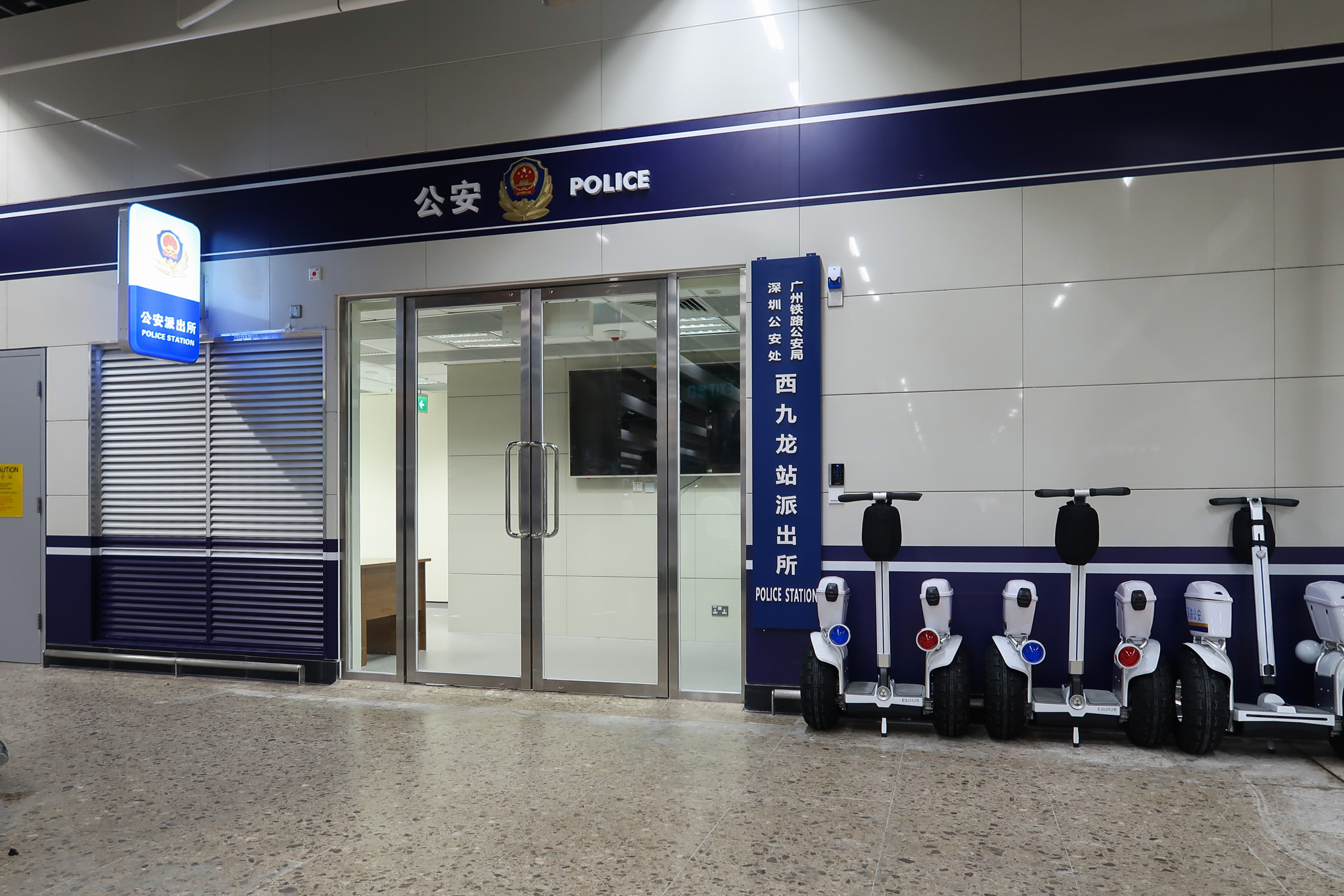
West Kowloon Station Police Station

The Ministry of Public Security Railway Public Security Bureau's Shenzhen Railway Public Security Division operates the West Kowloon Station Police Station (西九龙站派出所) with jurisdiction over the mainland port area.

There have been reported cases of travellers being detained or arrested by mainland police in the Port area. In one case, Simon Cheng, a Hong Kong resident working for the British consulate was detained upon returning to Hong Kong and sent back to mainland China by mainland police officers. Amid the 2019–20 Hong Kong protests, Chinese border officers have also begun to routinely search the phones of travellers for evidence of involvement in the protests.

== Awards ==
In 2010, the West Kowloon station design won "Cityscape Awards for Architecture" in the Emerging Markets of Tourism, Travel & Transport Future Awards. In the same year on 4 November, the West Kowloon station design won the "Best Future Project ─ Infrastructure" World Architecture Festival Awards.

== See also ==
- Woodlands Train Checkpoint
- Juxtaposed controls - co-location of immigration and customs on trains and ferries
