= Zhaoqing East railway station =

Railway station in Zhaoqing, Guangdong

Zhaoqing East 肇庆东
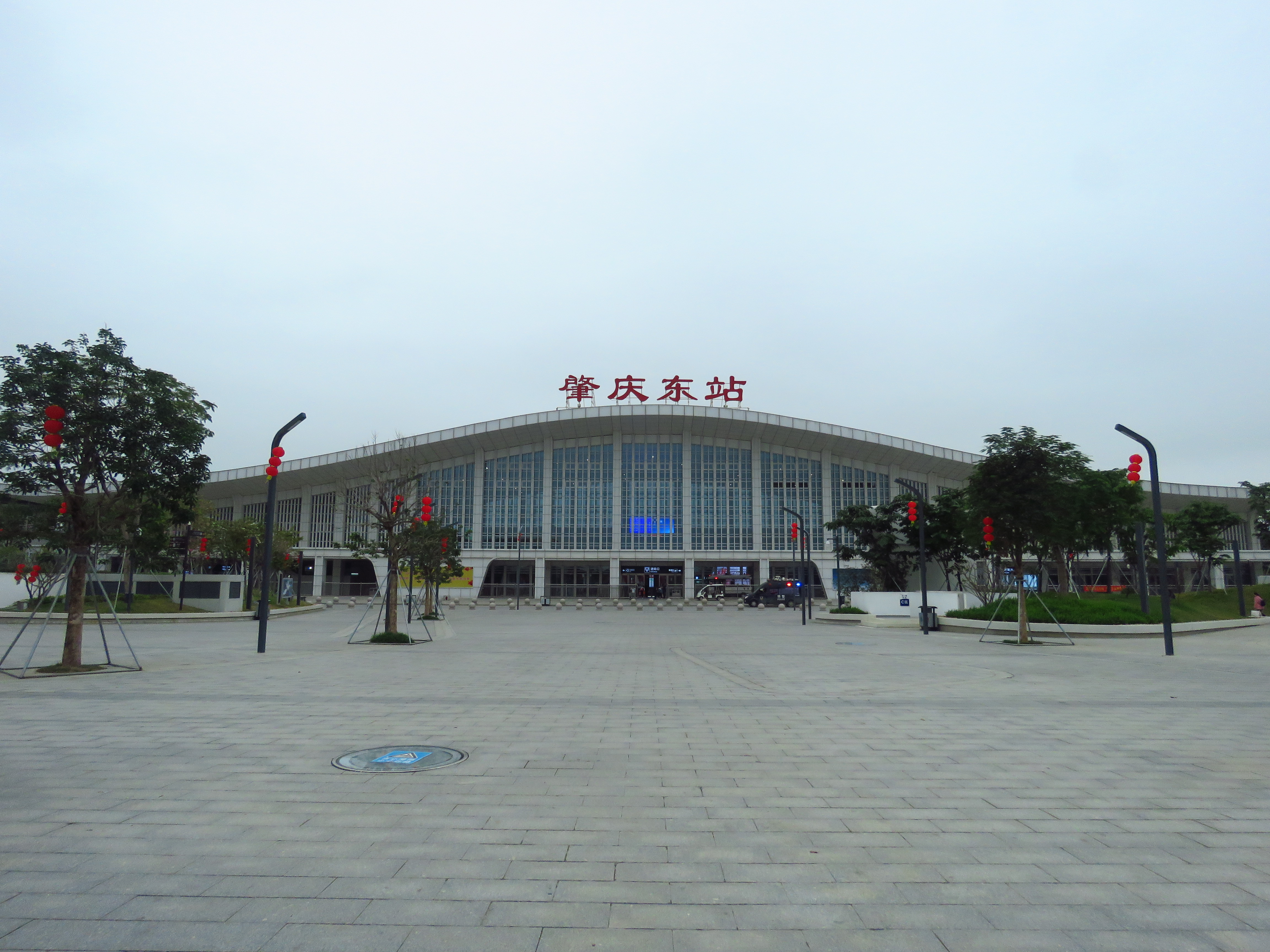
- Exterior of the station

General information
- Location: Yong'an, Dinghu District, Zhaoqing, Guangdong; China
- Coordinates: 23°13′1.73″N 112°39′29.03″E
- Line(s): Guiyang–Guangzhou high-speed railway; Nanning–Guangzhou high-speed railway
- Platforms: 9

History
- Opened: 26 January 2015

Zhaoqing East railway station (Chinese: 肇庆东站) is a railway station in Yong'an, Dinghu District, Zhaoqing, Guangdong, China. It is an intermediate station on the Guiyang–Guangzhou high-speed railway. It opened on 26 January 2015. The station has four island platforms and one side platform. It is situated adjacent and perpendicular to Dinghu East railway station and a walkway is provided for transfer between the two stations.

Preceding station	China Railway High-speed	Following station
Guangning towards Guiyang North	Guiyang–Guangzhou high-speed railway	Sanshui South towards Guangzhou South
Yunfu East towards Nanning	Nanning–Guangzhou high-speed railway	Sanshui South towards Guangzhou South
