= Dongguan South railway station =

Railway station in Dongguan, China

Dongguan South 东莞南
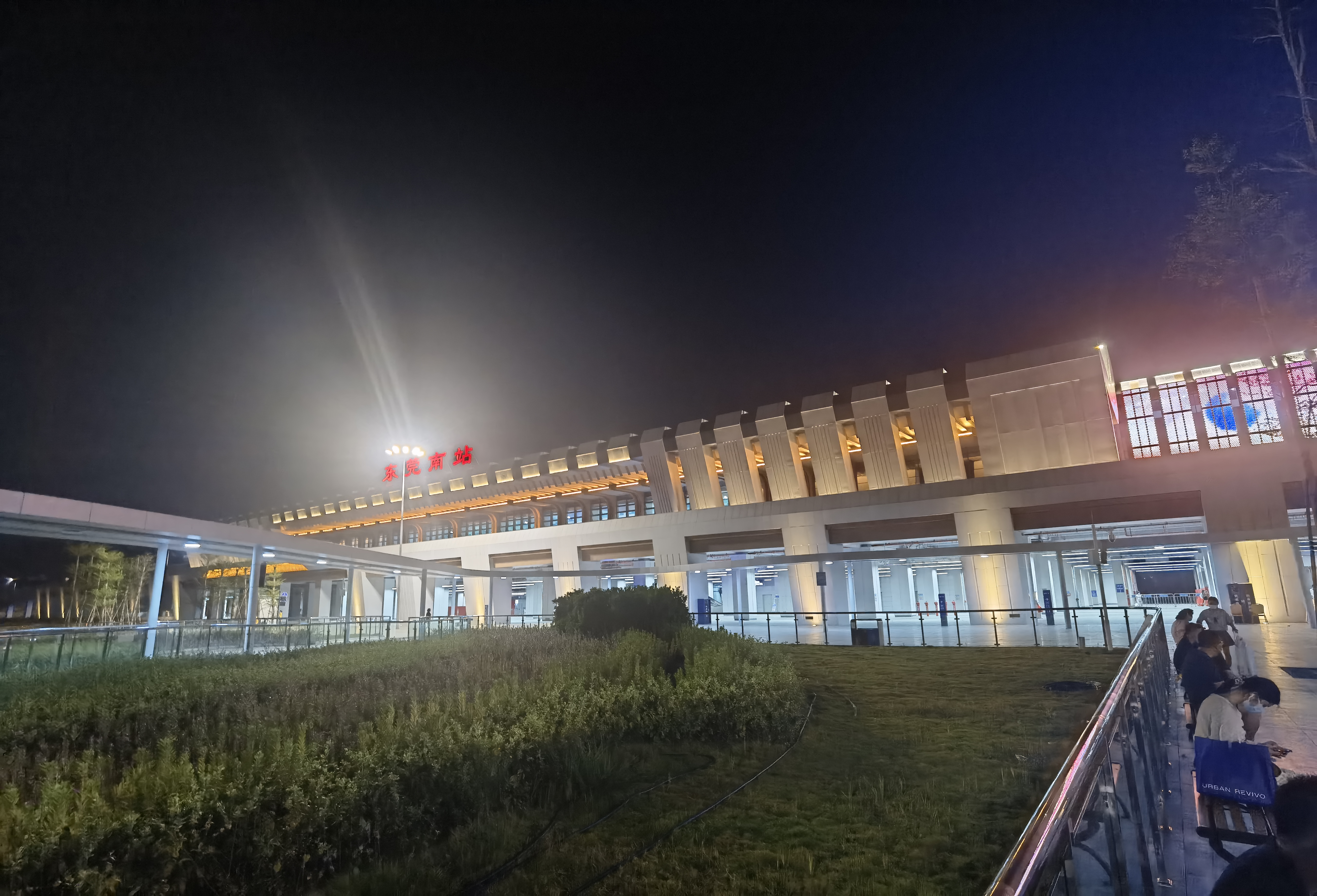

General information
- Location: Dongguan, Guangdong; China
- Coordinates: 22.8476°N 114.0638°E
- Operated by: CR Guangzhou
- Line: Ganshen section of Beijing-Hong Kong High-Speed Railway

Other information
- Classification: 2nd class station

History
- Opened: 10 December 2021; 4 years ago Beijing-Hong Kong High-Speed Railway (Ganshen section)
Location

Dongguan South railway station (Chinese: 东莞南站) is a station in Tangxia, Dongguan City, Guangdong Province, China. It is one of the stations on the Beijing-Hong Kong High-Speed Railway between Huizhou North railway station in Huizhou and Guangmingcheng railway station in Shenzhen City.

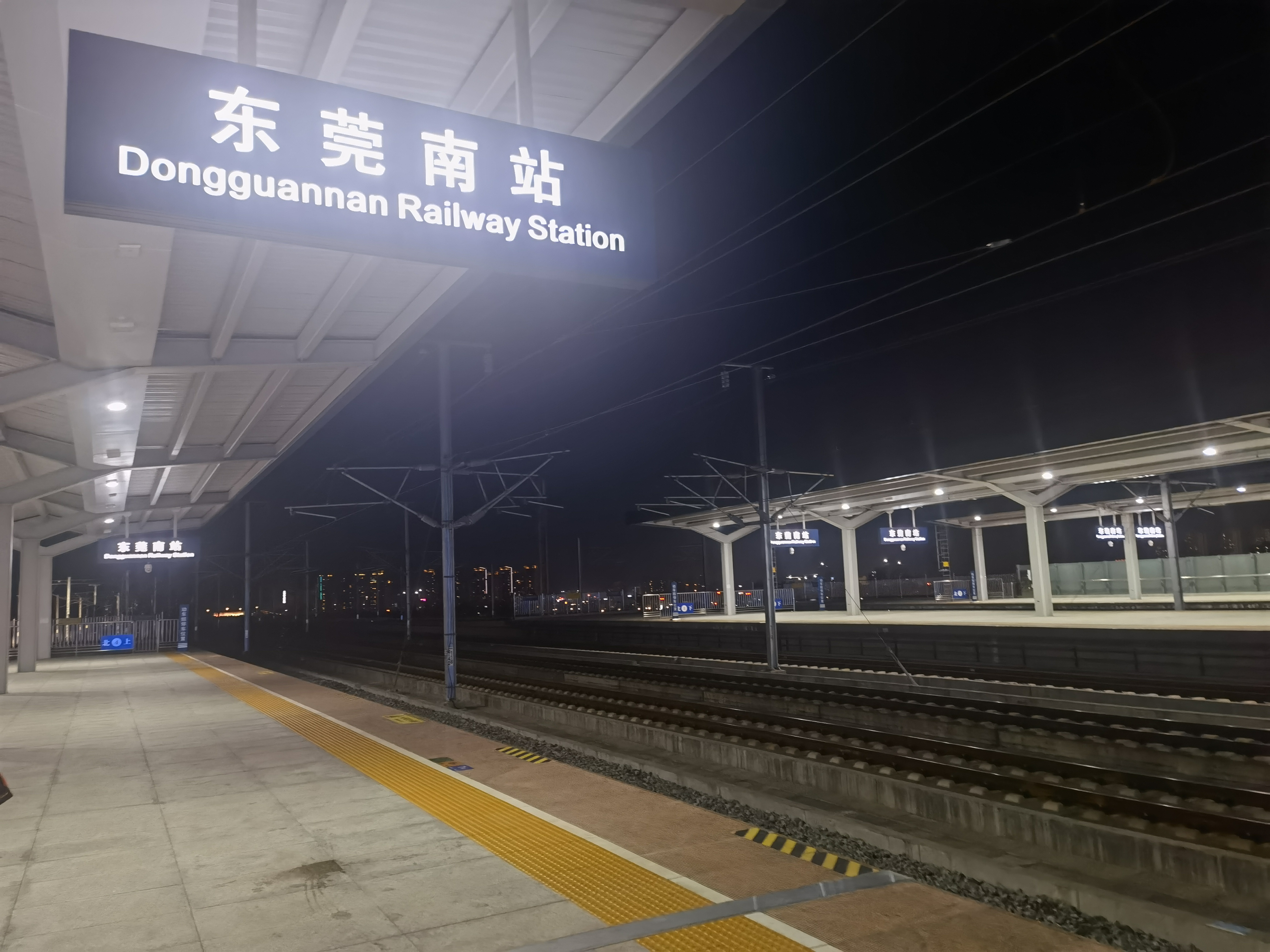
Platform view of Dongguan South Station

== See also ==
- Ganzhou–Shenzhen high-speed railway
- Beijing-Hong Kong High-Speed Railway

Preceding station	China Railway High-speed	Following station
Huizhou North towards Ganzhou West	Ganzhou–Shenzhen high-speed railway	Guangmingcheng towards Shenzhen North
