= List of administrative divisions of Guangdong =

Administrative divisions of Guangdong, a province of the People's Republic of China

Guangdong Province
- Province
- Capital: Guangzhou

Prefecture-level divisions
- Sub-provincial cities: 2
- Prefectural cities: 19

County level divisions
- County cities: 20
- Counties: 36
- Autonomous counties: 3
- Districts: 64

Township level divisions
- Towns: 1,134
- Townships: 4
- Ethnic townships: 7
- Subdistricts: 436

Villages level divisions
- Communities: 6,717
- Administrative villages: 19,776
- Dongguan and Zhongshan districts are not counted into the figures above. All new areas and new districts are also not counted.

Guangdong, a province of the People's Republic of China, is made up of the following administrative divisions.

== Administrative divisions ==
All of these administrative divisions are explained in greater detail at political divisions of China. This chart lists all prefecture-level and county-level divisions of Guangdong.

Prefecture level (Division code)	County Level				
Prefecture level (Division code)	Name	Chinese	Hanyu Pinyin	Division code	
Guangzhou city 广州市; Guǎngzhōu Shì (Capital – Sub-provincial) (4401 / CAN)	Liwan District	荔湾区	Lìwān Qū	440103	LWQ
Guangzhou city 广州市; Guǎngzhōu Shì (Capital – Sub-provincial) (4401 / CAN)	Yuexiu District	越秀区	Yuèxiù Qū	440104	YXU
Guangzhou city 广州市; Guǎngzhōu Shì (Capital – Sub-provincial) (4401 / CAN)	Haizhu District	海珠区	Hǎizhū Qū	440105	HZU
Guangzhou city 广州市; Guǎngzhōu Shì (Capital – Sub-provincial) (4401 / CAN)	Tianhe District	天河区	Tiānhé Qū	440106	THQ
Guangzhou city 广州市; Guǎngzhōu Shì (Capital – Sub-provincial) (4401 / CAN)	Baiyun District	白云区	Báiyún Qū	440111	BYN
Guangzhou city 广州市; Guǎngzhōu Shì (Capital – Sub-provincial) (4401 / CAN)	Huangpu District	黄埔区	Huángpù Qū	440112	HPU
Guangzhou city 广州市; Guǎngzhōu Shì (Capital – Sub-provincial) (4401 / CAN)	Panyu District	番禺区	Pānyú Qū	440113	PNY
Guangzhou city 广州市; Guǎngzhōu Shì (Capital – Sub-provincial) (4401 / CAN)	Huadu District	花都区	Huādū Qū	440114	HDU
Guangzhou city 广州市; Guǎngzhōu Shì (Capital – Sub-provincial) (4401 / CAN)	Nansha District	南沙区	Nánshā Qū	440115	NSH
Guangzhou city 广州市; Guǎngzhōu Shì (Capital – Sub-provincial) (4401 / CAN)	Conghua District	从化区	Cónghuà Qū	440117	CHE
Guangzhou city 广州市; Guǎngzhōu Shì (Capital – Sub-provincial) (4401 / CAN)	Zengcheng District	增城区	Zēngchéng Qū	440118	ZCB
Shaoguan city 韶关市; Sháoguān Shì (4402 / HSC)	Wujiang District	武江区	Wǔjiāng Qū	440203	WJQ
Shaoguan city 韶关市; Sháoguān Shì (4402 / HSC)	Zhenjiang District	浈江区	Zhēnjiāng Qū	440204	ZJQ
Shaoguan city 韶关市; Sháoguān Shì (4402 / HSC)	Qujiang District	曲江区	Qǔjiāng Qū	440205	QUJ
Shaoguan city 韶关市; Sháoguān Shì (4402 / HSC)	Shixing County	始兴县	Shǐxīng Xiàn	440222	SXX
Shaoguan city 韶关市; Sháoguān Shì (4402 / HSC)	Renhua County	仁化县	Rénhuà Xiàn	440224	RHA
Shaoguan city 韶关市; Sháoguān Shì (4402 / HSC)	Wengyuan County	翁源县	Wēngyuán Xiàn	440229	WYN
Shaoguan city 韶关市; Sháoguān Shì (4402 / HSC)	Ruyuan County (Note: Conventional name: Ruyuan Yao Autonomous County; Chinese: 乳源瑶族自治县; pinyin: Rǔyuán Yáozú Zìzhìxiàn)	乳源县	Rǔyuán Xiàn	440232	RYN
Shaoguan city 韶关市; Sháoguān Shì (4402 / HSC)	Xinfeng County	新丰县	Xīnfēng Xiàn	440233	XFY
Shaoguan city 韶关市; Sháoguān Shì (4402 / HSC)	Lechang city	乐昌市	Lèchāng Shì	440281	LEC
Shaoguan city 韶关市; Sháoguān Shì (4402 / HSC)	Nanxiong city	南雄市	Nánxióng Shì	440282	NXS
Shenzhen city 深圳市; Shēnzhèn Shì (Sub-provincial) (4403 / SZX)	Luohu District	罗湖区	Luóhú Qū	440303	LHQ
Shenzhen city 深圳市; Shēnzhèn Shì (Sub-provincial) (4403 / SZX)	Futian District	福田区	Fútián Qū	440304	FTN
Shenzhen city 深圳市; Shēnzhèn Shì (Sub-provincial) (4403 / SZX)	Nanshan District	南山区	Nánshān Qū	440305	NSN
Shenzhen city 深圳市; Shēnzhèn Shì (Sub-provincial) (4403 / SZX)	Bao'an District	宝安区	Bǎo'ān Qū	440306	BAQ
Shenzhen city 深圳市; Shēnzhèn Shì (Sub-provincial) (4403 / SZX)	Longgang District	龙岗区	Lónggǎng Qū	440307	LGG
Shenzhen city 深圳市; Shēnzhèn Shì (Sub-provincial) (4403 / SZX)	Yantian District	盐田区	Yántián Qū	440308	YTQ
Shenzhen city 深圳市; Shēnzhèn Shì (Sub-provincial) (4403 / SZX)	Longhua District	龙华区	Lónghuá Qū	440309	LHA
Shenzhen city 深圳市; Shēnzhèn Shì (Sub-provincial) (4403 / SZX)	Pingshan District	坪山区	Píngshān Qū	440310	PSG
Shenzhen city 深圳市; Shēnzhèn Shì (Sub-provincial) (4403 / SZX)	Guangming District	光明区	Guāngmíng Qū	440311	
Zhuhai city 珠海市; Zhūhǎi Shì (4404 / ZUH)	Xiangzhou District	香洲区	Xiāngzhōu Qū	440402	XZQ
Zhuhai city 珠海市; Zhūhǎi Shì (4404 / ZUH)	Doumen District	斗门区	Dǒumén Qū	440403	DOU
Zhuhai city 珠海市; Zhūhǎi Shì (4404 / ZUH)	Jinwan District	金湾区	Jīnwān Qū	440404	JNW
Shantou city 汕头市; Shàntóu Shì (4405 / SWA)	Longhu District	龙湖区	Lónghú Qū	440507	LHH
Shantou city 汕头市; Shàntóu Shì (4405 / SWA)	Jinping District	金平区	Jīnpíng Qū	440511	JPQ
Shantou city 汕头市; Shàntóu Shì (4405 / SWA)	Haojiang District	濠江区	Háojiāng Qū	440512	HJI
Shantou city 汕头市; Shàntóu Shì (4405 / SWA)	Chaoyang District	潮阳区	Cháoyáng Qū	440513	CHY
Shantou city 汕头市; Shàntóu Shì (4405 / SWA)	Chaonan District	潮南区	Cháonán Qū	440514	CHN
Shantou city 汕头市; Shàntóu Shì (4405 / SWA)	Chenghai District	澄海区	Chénghǎi Qū	440515	CGH
Shantou city 汕头市; Shàntóu Shì (4405 / SWA)	Nan'ao County	南澳县	Nán'ào Xiàn	440523	NAN
Foshan city 佛山市; Fóshān Shì (4406 / FOS)	Chancheng District	禅城区	Chánchéng Qū	440604	CHC
Foshan city 佛山市; Fóshān Shì (4406 / FOS)	Nanhai District	南海区	Nánhǎi Qū	440605	NAH
Foshan city 佛山市; Fóshān Shì (4406 / FOS)	Shunde District	顺德区	Shùndé Qū	440606	SUD
Foshan city 佛山市; Fóshān Shì (4406 / FOS)	Sanshui District	三水区	Sānshuǐ Qū	440607	SJQ
Foshan city 佛山市; Fóshān Shì (4406 / FOS)	Gaoming District	高明区	Gāomíng Qū	440608	GOM
Jiangmen city 江门市; Jiāngmén Shì (4407 / JMN)	Pengjiang District	蓬江区	Péngjiāng Qū	440703	PJJ
Jiangmen city 江门市; Jiāngmén Shì (4407 / JMN)	Jianghai District	江海区	Jiānghǎi Qū	440704	JHI
Jiangmen city 江门市; Jiāngmén Shì (4407 / JMN)	Xinhui District	新会区	Xīnhuì Qū	440705	XIN
Jiangmen city 江门市; Jiāngmén Shì (4407 / JMN)	Taishan city	台山市	Táishān Shì	440781	TSS
Jiangmen city 江门市; Jiāngmén Shì (4407 / JMN)	Kaiping city	开平市	Kāipíng Shì	440783	KPS
Jiangmen city 江门市; Jiāngmén Shì (4407 / JMN)	Heshan city	鹤山市	Hèshān Shì	440784	HES
Jiangmen city 江门市; Jiāngmén Shì (4407 / JMN)	Enping city	恩平市	Ēnpíng Shì	440785	ENP
Zhanjiang city 湛江市; Zhànjiāng Shì (4408 / ZHA)	Chikan District	赤坎区	Chìkǎn Qū	440802	CKQ
Zhanjiang city 湛江市; Zhànjiāng Shì (4408 / ZHA)	Xiashan District	霞山区	Xiáshān Qū	440803	XAS
Zhanjiang city 湛江市; Zhànjiāng Shì (4408 / ZHA)	Potou District	坡头区	Pōtóu Qū	440804	PTU
Zhanjiang city 湛江市; Zhànjiāng Shì (4408 / ZHA)	Mazhang District	麻章区	Mázhāng Qū	440811	MZQ
Zhanjiang city 湛江市; Zhànjiāng Shì (4408 / ZHA)	Suixi County	遂溪县	Suíxī Xiàn	440823	SXI
Zhanjiang city 湛江市; Zhànjiāng Shì (4408 / ZHA)	Xuwen County	徐闻县	Xúwén Xiàn	440825	XWN
Zhanjiang city 湛江市; Zhànjiāng Shì (4408 / ZHA)	Lianjiang city	廉江市	Liánjiāng Shì	440881	LJS
Zhanjiang city 湛江市; Zhànjiāng Shì (4408 / ZHA)	Leizhou city	雷州市	Léizhōu Shì	440882	LEZ
Zhanjiang city 湛江市; Zhànjiāng Shì (4408 / ZHA)	Wuchuan city	吴川市	Wúchuān Shì	440883	WCS
Maoming city 茂名市; Màomíng Shì (4409 / MMI)	Maonan District	茂南区	Màonán Qū	440902	MNQ
Maoming city 茂名市; Màomíng Shì (4409 / MMI)	Dianbai District	电白区	Diànbái Qū	440904	DBD
Maoming city 茂名市; Màomíng Shì (4409 / MMI)	Gaozhou city	高州市	Gāozhōu Shì	440981	GZO
Maoming city 茂名市; Màomíng Shì (4409 / MMI)	Huazhou city	化州市	Huàzhōu Shì	440982	HZY
Maoming city 茂名市; Màomíng Shì (4409 / MMI)	Xinyi city	信宜市	Xìnyí Shì	440983	XYY
Zhaoqing city 肇庆市; Zhàoqìng Shì (4412 / ZQG)	Duanzhou District	端州区	Duānzhōu Qū	441202	DZQ
Zhaoqing city 肇庆市; Zhàoqìng Shì (4412 / ZQG)	Dinghu District	鼎湖区	Dǐnghú Qū	441203	DGH
Zhaoqing city 肇庆市; Zhàoqìng Shì (4412 / ZQG)	Gaoyao District	高要区	Gāoyào Qū	441204	GYG
Zhaoqing city 肇庆市; Zhàoqìng Shì (4412 / ZQG)	Guangning County	广宁县	Guǎngníng Xiàn	441223	GNG
Zhaoqing city 肇庆市; Zhàoqìng Shì (4412 / ZQG)	Huaiji County	怀集县	Huáijí Xiàn	441224	HJX
Zhaoqing city 肇庆市; Zhàoqìng Shì (4412 / ZQG)	Fengkai County	封开县	Fēngkāi Xiàn	441225	FKX
Zhaoqing city 肇庆市; Zhàoqìng Shì (4412 / ZQG)	Deqing County	德庆县	Déqìng Xiàn	441226	DQY
Zhaoqing city 肇庆市; Zhàoqìng Shì (4412 / ZQG)	Sihui city	四会市	Sìhuì Shì	441284	SHI
Huizhou city 惠州市; Huìzhōu Shì (4413 / HUI)	Huicheng District	惠城区	Huìchéng Qū	441302	HCQ
Huizhou city 惠州市; Huìzhōu Shì (4413 / HUI)	Huiyang District	惠阳区	Huìyáng Qū	441303	HUY
Huizhou city 惠州市; Huìzhōu Shì (4413 / HUI)	Boluo County	博罗县	Bóluó Xiàn	441322	BOL
Huizhou city 惠州市; Huìzhōu Shì (4413 / HUI)	Huidong County	惠东县	Huìdōng Xiàn	441323	HID
Huizhou city 惠州市; Huìzhōu Shì (4413 / HUI)	Longmen County	龙门县	Lóngmén Xiàn	441324	LMN
Meizhou city 梅州市; Méizhōu Shì (4414 / MXZ)	Meijiang District	梅江区	Méijiāng Qū	441402	MJQ
Meizhou city 梅州市; Méizhōu Shì (4414 / MXZ)	Meixian District	梅县区	Méixiàn Qū	441403	MXN
Meizhou city 梅州市; Méizhōu Shì (4414 / MXZ)	Dabu County	大埔县	Dàbù Xiàn	441422	DBX
Meizhou city 梅州市; Méizhōu Shì (4414 / MXZ)	Fengshun County	丰顺县	Fēngshùn Xiàn	441423	FES
Meizhou city 梅州市; Méizhōu Shì (4414 / MXZ)	Wuhua County	五华县	Wǔhuá Xiàn	441424	WHY
Meizhou city 梅州市; Méizhōu Shì (4414 / MXZ)	Pingyuan County	平远县	Píngyuǎn Xiàn	441426	PYY
Meizhou city 梅州市; Méizhōu Shì (4414 / MXZ)	Jiaoling County	蕉岭县	Jiāolǐng Xiàn	441427	JOL
Meizhou city 梅州市; Méizhōu Shì (4414 / MXZ)	Xingning city	兴宁市	Xīngníng Shì	441481	XNG
Shanwei city 汕尾市; Shànwěi Shì (4415 / SWE)	Chengqu District (Note: Official name registered by the Ministry of Civil Affairs.) (Note: Pratas Island (Tungsha/Dongsha) and the Vereker Banks are claimed by the PRC as a part of Chengqu in Shanwei, but are part of Cijin District, Kaohsiung, Taiwan (ROC).)	城区	Chéngqū	441502	CQS
Shanwei city 汕尾市; Shànwěi Shì (4415 / SWE)	Haifeng County	海丰县	Hǎifēng Xiàn	441521	HIF
Shanwei city 汕尾市; Shànwěi Shì (4415 / SWE)	Luhe County	陆河县	Lùhé Xiàn	441523	LHY
Shanwei city 汕尾市; Shànwěi Shì (4415 / SWE)	Lufeng city	陆丰市	Lùfēng Shì	441581	LUF
Heyuan city 河源市; Héyuán Shì (4416 / HEY)	Yuancheng District	源城区	Yuánchéng Qū	441602	YCQ
Heyuan city 河源市; Héyuán Shì (4416 / HEY)	Zijin County	紫金县	Zǐjīn Xiàn	441621	ZJY
Heyuan city 河源市; Héyuán Shì (4416 / HEY)	Lungchuan County	龙川县	Lóngchuān Xiàn	441622	LCY
Heyuan city 河源市; Héyuán Shì (4416 / HEY)	Lianping County	连平县	Liánpíng Xiàn	441623	LNP
Heyuan city 河源市; Héyuán Shì (4416 / HEY)	Heping County	和平县	Hépíng Xiàn	441624	HPY
Heyuan city 河源市; Héyuán Shì (4416 / HEY)	Dongyuan County	东源县	Dōngyuán Xiàn	441625	DYN
Yangjiang city 阳江市; Yángjiāng Shì (4417 / YJI)	Jiangcheng District	江城区	Jiāngchéng Qū	441702	JCQ
Yangjiang city 阳江市; Yángjiāng Shì (4417 / YJI)	Yangdong District	阳东区	Yángdōng Qū	441704	YDA
Yangjiang city 阳江市; Yángjiāng Shì (4417 / YJI)	Yangxi County	阳西县	Yángxī Xiàn	441721	YXY
Yangjiang city 阳江市; Yángjiāng Shì (4417 / YJI)	Yangchun city	阳春市	Yángchūn Shì	441781	YCU
Qingyuan city 清远市; Qīngyuǎn Shì (4418 / QYN)	Qingcheng District	清城区	Qīngchéng Qū	441802	QCQ
Qingyuan city 清远市; Qīngyuǎn Shì (4418 / QYN)	Qingxin District	清新区	Qīngxīn Qū	441803	QXB
Qingyuan city 清远市; Qīngyuǎn Shì (4418 / QYN)	Fogang County	佛冈县	Fógāng Xiàn	441821	FGY
Qingyuan city 清远市; Qīngyuǎn Shì (4418 / QYN)	Yangshan County	阳山县	Yángshān Xiàn	441823	YSN
Qingyuan city 清远市; Qīngyuǎn Shì (4418 / QYN)	Lianshan County (Note: Conventional name: Lianshan Zhuang and Yao Autonomous County; Chinese: 连山壮族瑶族自治县; pinyin: Liánshān Zhuàngzú Yáozú Zìzhìxiàn)	连山县	Liánshān Xiàn	441825	LSZ
Qingyuan city 清远市; Qīngyuǎn Shì (4418 / QYN)	Liannan County (Note: Conventional name: Liannan Yao Autonomous County; Chinese: 连南瑶族自治县; pinyin: Liánnán Yáozú Zìzhìxiàn)	连南县	Liánnán Xiàn	441826	LNN
Qingyuan city 清远市; Qīngyuǎn Shì (4418 / QYN)	Yingde city	英德市	Yīngdé Shì	441881	YDS
Qingyuan city 清远市; Qīngyuǎn Shì (4418 / QYN)	Lianzhou city	连州市	Liánzhōu Shì	441882	LZO
Dongguan city 东莞市; Dōngguǎn Shì (4419 / DGG)	Chengqu Area (Note: These districts within Dongguan are not formal administrative subdivisions recognized by the Ministry of Civil Affairs.)	城区片区	Chéngqū Piànqū	441901	DGG
Dongguan city 东莞市; Dōngguǎn Shì (4419 / DGG)	Songshanhu Area	松山湖片区	Sōngshānhú Piànqū	441901	DGG
Dongguan city 东莞市; Dōngguǎn Shì (4419 / DGG)	Dongbu Area	东部片区	Dōngbù Piànqū	441901	DGG
Dongguan city 东莞市; Dōngguǎn Shì (4419 / DGG)	Dongnan Area	东南片区	Dōngnán Piànqū	441901	DGG
Dongguan city 东莞市; Dōngguǎn Shì (4419 / DGG)	Binhai Area	滨海片区	Bīnhǎi Piànqū	441901	DGG
Dongguan city 东莞市; Dōngguǎn Shì (4419 / DGG)	Shuixiang Area	水乡片区	Shuǐxiāng Piànqū	441901	DGG
Zhongshan city 中山市; Zhōngshān Shì (4420 / ZSN)	Zhongxin Area (Note: These districts within Zhongshan are not formal administrative subdivisions recognized by the Ministry of Civil Affairs.)	中心片区	Zhōngxīn Piànqū	442001	ZSN
Zhongshan city 中山市; Zhōngshān Shì (4420 / ZSN)	Dongbu Area	东部片区	Dōngbù Piànqū	442001	ZSN
Zhongshan city 中山市; Zhōngshān Shì (4420 / ZSN)	Xibei Area	西北片区	Xīběi Piànqū	442001	ZSN
Zhongshan city 中山市; Zhōngshān Shì (4420 / ZSN)	Dongbei Area	东北片区	Dōngběi Piànqū	442001	ZSN
Zhongshan city 中山市; Zhōngshān Shì (4420 / ZSN)	Nanbu Area	南部片区	Nánbù Piànq	442001	ZSN
Chaozhou city 潮州市; Cháozhōu Shì (4451 / CZY)	Xiangqiao District	湘桥区	Xiāngqiáo Qū	445102	XQO
Chaozhou city 潮州市; Cháozhōu Shì (4451 / CZY)	Chao'an District	潮安区	Cháo'ān Qū	445103	CAA
Chaozhou city 潮州市; Cháozhōu Shì (4451 / CZY)	Raoping County	饶平县	Ràopíng Xiàn	445122	RPG
Jieyang city 揭阳市; Jiēyáng Shì (4452 / JIY)	Rongcheng District	榕城区	Róngchéng Qū	445202	RCH
Jieyang city 揭阳市; Jiēyáng Shì (4452 / JIY)	Jiedong District	揭东区	Jiēdōng Qū	445203	JDA
Jieyang city 揭阳市; Jiēyáng Shì (4452 / JIY)	Jiexi County	揭西县	Jiēxī Xiàn	445222	JEX
Jieyang city 揭阳市; Jiēyáng Shì (4452 / JIY)	Huilai County	惠来县	Huìlái Xiàn	445224	HLY
Jieyang city 揭阳市; Jiēyáng Shì (4452 / JIY)	Puning city	普宁市	Pǔníng Shì	445281	PNG
Yunfu city 云浮市; Yúnfú Shì (4453 / YFS)	Yuncheng District	云城区	Yúnchéng Qū	445302	YYF
Yunfu city 云浮市; Yúnfú Shì (4453 / YFS)	Yun'an District	云安区	Yún'ān Qū	445303	YAG
Yunfu city 云浮市; Yúnfú Shì (4453 / YFS)	Xinxing County	新兴县	Xīnxīng Xiàn	445321	XNX
Yunfu city 云浮市; Yúnfú Shì (4453 / YFS)	Yunan County	郁南县	Yùnán Xiàn	445322	YNK
Yunfu city 云浮市; Yúnfú Shì (4453 / YFS)	Luoding city	罗定市	Luódìng Shì	445381	LUO

== Recent changes in administrative divisions ==
Date	Before	After	Note	Reference
1981-10-23	★ Hainan Administrative Region	★ Hainan Administrative Region	transferred	
1981-10-23	☆ parts of Hainan Prefecture (Aut.)	★ Hainan Administrative Region	transferred	
1981-10-23	↳ parts of Ya County	↳ Paracels, Spratlys, and Zhongsha Islands; Authority (PC-Administration Office)	transferred & established	
1981-12-07	Gaohe County	Gaoming County	disestablished & established	
1981-12-07	Gaohe County	Heshan County	disestablished & established	
1982-12-21	parts of Shenzhen (P-City) city district	Bao'an County	established	
1983-01-18	all Province-controlled city (P-City) → Prefecture-level city (PL-City)			Civil Affairs Announcement
1983-01-18	all Prefecture-controlled city (PC-City) → County-level city (CL-City) (PC-Administration Office → CL-Administration Office)			Civil Affairs Announcement
1983-06-06	Shenzhen (PL-City) city district	Luohu District Office	established	
1983-06-06	Shenzhen (PL-City) city district	Futian District Office	established	
1983-06-06	Shenzhen (PL-City) city district	Nantou District Office	established	
1983-06-06	Shenzhen (PL-City) city district	Shatoujiao District Office	established	
1983-12-22	Shaoguan Prefecture	Shaoguan (PL-City)	merged into	
1983-12-22	parts of Shaoguan Prefecture	Guangzhou (PL-City)	transferred	
1983-12-22	↳ Qingyuan County	↳ Qingyuan County	transferred	
1983-12-22	↳ Fogang County	↳ Fogang County	transferred	
1983-12-22	Foshan Prefecture	Foshan (PL-City)	merged into	
1983-12-22	Zhongshan County	Zhongshan (CL-City)	reorganized	
1983-12-22	parts of Foshan Prefecture	Jiangmen (PL-City)	transferred	
1983-12-22	↳ Taishan County	↳ Taishan County	transferred	
1983-12-22	↳ Xinhui County	↳ Xinhui County	transferred	
1983-12-22	↳ Kaiping County	↳ Kaiping County	transferred	
1983-12-22	↳ Heshan County	↳ Heshan County	transferred	
1983-12-22	↳ Enping County	↳ Enping County	transferred	
1983-12-22	parts of Foshan Prefecture	Zhuhai (PL-City)	transferred	
1983-12-22	↳ Doumen County	↳ Doumen County	transferred	
1983-12-22	Shantou Prefecture	Shantou (PL-City)	merged into	
1983-12-22	Chao'an County	Chaozhou (CL-City)	merged into	
1983-12-22	parts of Shantou Prefecture	Huizhou Prefecture	transferred	
1983-12-22	↳ Haifeng County	↳ Haifeng County	transferred	
1983-12-22	↳ Lufeng County	↳ Lufeng County	transferred	
1983-12-22	Zhanjiang Prefecture	Zhanjiang (PL-City)	merged into	
1983-12-22	parts of Zhanjiang Prefecture	Maoming (PL-City)	transferred	
1983-12-22	↳ Gaozhou County	↳ Gaozhou County	transferred	
1983-12-22	↳ Huazhou County	↳ Huazhou County	transferred	
1983-12-22	↳ Xinyi County	↳ Xinyi County	transferred	
1983-12-22	↳ Dianbai County	↳ Dianbai County	transferred	
1983-12-22	parts of Zhanjiang Prefecture	Jiangmen (PL-City)	transferred	
1983-12-22	↳ Yangjiang County	↳ Yangjiang County	transferred	
1983-12-22	↳ Yangchun County	↳ Yangchun County	transferred	
1983-12-22	Meizhou (CL-City)	Meixian (CL-City)	disestablished & established	
1983-12-22	Mei County	Meixian (CL-City)	disestablished & established	
1984-01-07	Shaoguan (PL-City) city district	Zhenjiang District	established	
1984-01-07	Shaoguan (PL-City) city district	Wujiang District	established	
1984-01-07	Shaoguan (PL-City) city district	Beijing District	established	
1984-01-07	Zhuhai (PL-City) city district	Xiangzhou District	established	
1984-01-07	Shantou (PL-City) city district	Anping District	established	
1984-01-07	Shantou (PL-City) city district	Tongping District	established	
1984-01-07	Shantou (PL-City) city district	Gongyuan District	established	
1984-01-07	Shantou (PL-City) city district	Jinsha District	established	
1984-01-07	Shantou (PL-City) city district	Dahao District	established	
1984-01-07	Shantou (PL-City) city district	Jiao District, Shantou	established	
1984-01-07	Foshan (PL-City) city district	Fenjiang District	established	
1984-01-07	Foshan (PL-City) city district	Shiwan District	established	
1984-01-07	Jiangmen (PL-City) city district	Cheng District, Jiangmen	established	
1984-01-07	Jiangmen (PL-City) city district	Jiao District, Jiangmen	established	
1984-01-07	Zhanjiang (PL-City) city district	Potou District	established	
1984-05-19	Ya County	Sanya (CL-City)	reorganized	
1985-05-24	parts of Panyu County	Tainhe District	established	
1985-05-24	parts of Panyu County	Fangcun District	established	
1985-09-05	Dongguan County	Dongguan (CL-City)	reorganized	
1986-01-10	parts of Baoting County	Tongshi (CL-City)	established	
1986-01-10	parts of Qiongzhong County	Tongshi (CL-City)	established	
1986-01-10	parts of Ledong County	Tongshi (CL-City)	established	
1986-05-31	★ Hainan Administrative Region	Haikou (PL-City) city district	established	
1986-05-31	↳ Haikou (CL-City)	Haikou (PL-City) city district	transferred	
1987-01-23	Jiao District, Guangzhou	Baiyun District	renamed	
1987-02-12	Fenjiang District	Cheng District, Foshan	renamed	
1987-11-20	★ Hainan Administrative Region	Hainan Administrative Region	transferred	
1987-11-20	☆ parts of Hainan Prefecture (Aut.)	Hainan Administrative Region	disestablished	
1987-11-20	↳ Baisha County	↳ Baisha County (Aut.)	transferred & reorganized	
1987-11-20	↳ Changjiang County	↳ Changjiang County (Aut.)	transferred & reorganized	
1987-11-20	↳ Ledong County	↳ Ledong County (Aut.)	transferred & reorganized	
1987-11-20	↳ Lingshui County	↳ Lingshui County (Aut.)	transferred & reorganized	
1987-11-20	↳ Baoting County	↳ Baoting County (Aut.)	transferred & reorganized	
1987-11-20	↳ Qiongzhong County	↳ Qiongzhong County (Aut.)	transferred & reorganized	
1987-11-20	↳ Dongfang County	↳ Dongfang County (Aut.)	transferred & reorganized	
1987-11-20	☆ parts of Hainan Prefecture (Aut.)	Sanya (PL-City) city district	established	
1987-11-20	↳ Sanya (CL-City)	Sanya (PL-City) city district	transferred	
1988-01-07	Zhaoqing Prefecture	Zhaoqing (PL-City)	reorganized	
1988-01-07	Zhaoqing (CL-City)	Duanzhou District	disestablished & established	
1988-01-07	Zhaoqing (CL-City)	Dinghu District	disestablished & established	
1988-01-07	Huiyang Prefecture	Huizhou (PL-City)	reorganized	
1988-01-07	Huizhou (CL-City)	Huicheng District	disestablished & established	
1988-01-07	parts of Guangzhou (PL-City)	Huizhou (PL-City)	transferred	
1988-01-07	↳ Longmen County	↳ Longmen County	transferred	
1988-01-07	Meixian Prefecture	Meizhou (PL-City)	reorganized	
1988-01-07	Meizhou (CL-City)	Meijiang District	disestablished & established	
1988-01-07	Meizhou (CL-City)	Mei County	disestablished & established	
1988-01-07	parts of Huiyang Prefecture	Shanwei (PL-City)	established	
1988-01-07	↳ Haifeng County	↳ Cheng District, Shanwei	transferred & established	
1988-01-07	↳ Haifeng County	↳ Haifeng County	transferred	
1988-01-07	↳ Lufeng County	↳ Luhe County	transferred & established	
1988-01-07	↳ Lufeng County	↳ Lufeng County	transferred	
1988-01-07	parts of Huiyang Prefecture	Heyuan (PL-City)	established	
1988-01-07	↳ Heyuan (CL-City)	↳ Cheng District, Heyuan	disestablished & established	
1988-01-07	↳ Heyuan (CL-City)	↳ Jiao District, Heyuan	disestablished & established	
1988-01-07	↳ Zijin County	↳ Zijin County	transferred	
1988-01-07	↳ Lungchuan County	↳ Lungchuan County	transferred	
1988-01-07	↳ Lianping County	↳ Lianping County	transferred	
1988-01-07	↳ Heping County	↳ Heping County	transferred	
1988-01-07	parts of Jiangmen (PL-City)	Yangjiang (PL-City)	established	
1988-01-07	↳ Yangjiang County	↳ Jiangcheng District	disestablished & established	
1988-01-07	↳ Yangjiang County	↳ Yangdong District	disestablished & established	
1988-01-07	↳ Yangjiang County	↳ Yangxi County	disestablished & established	
1988-01-07	↳ Yangchun County	↳ Yangchun County	transferred	
1988-01-07	parts of Guangzhou (PL-City)	Qingyuan (PL-City)	established	
1988-01-07	↳ Qingyuan County	↳ Qingcheng District	disestablished & established	
1988-01-07	↳ Qingyuan County	↳ Qingjiao District	disestablished & established	
1988-01-07	↳ Fogang County	↳ Fogang County	transferred	
1988-01-07	parts of Shaoguan (PL-City)	Qingyuan (PL-City)	transferred	
1988-01-07	↳ Yingde County	↳ Yingde County	transferred	
1988-01-07	↳ Yangshan County	↳ Yangshan County	transferred	
1988-01-07	↳ Lian County	↳ Lian County	transferred	
1988-01-07	↳ Lianshan County	↳ Lianshan County	transferred	
1988-01-07	↳ Liannan County	↳ Liannan County	transferred	
1988-01-07	parts of Huiyang Prefecture	Dongguan (PL-City) city district	established	
1988-01-07	↳ Dongguan (CL-City)	Dongguan (PL-City) city district	disestablished	
1988-01-07	parts of Foshan (PL-City)	Zhongshan (PL-City) city district	established	
1988-01-07	↳ Zhongshan (CL-City)	Zhongshan (PL-City) city district	disestablished	
1988-04-13	parts of Guangdong Province	Hainan Province	provincial established	Civil Affairs Announcement
1988-04-13	Haikou (PL-City) city district	Haikou (PL-City) city district	transferred	Civil Affairs Announcement
1988-04-13	Sanya (PL-City) city district	Sanya (PL-City) city district	transferred	Civil Affairs Announcement
1988-04-13	Hainan Administrative Region	provincial-controlled	disestablished & transferred	Civil Affairs Announcement
1988-04-13	↳ Tongshi (CL-City)	↳ Tongshi (CL-City)	transferred	Civil Affairs Announcement
1988-04-13	↳ Qiongshan County	↳ Qiongshan County	transferred	Civil Affairs Announcement
1988-04-13	↳ Qionghai County	↳ Qionghai County	transferred	Civil Affairs Announcement
1988-04-13	↳ Wenchang County	↳ Wenchang County	transferred	Civil Affairs Announcement
1988-04-13	↳ Wanning County	↳ Wanning County	transferred	Civil Affairs Announcement
1988-04-13	↳ Tunchang County	↳ Tunchang County	transferred	Civil Affairs Announcement
1988-04-13	↳ Ding'an County	↳ Ding'an County	transferred	Civil Affairs Announcement
1988-04-13	↳ Chengmai County	↳ Chengmai County	transferred	Civil Affairs Announcement
1988-04-13	↳ Lingao County	↳ Lingao County	transferred	Civil Affairs Announcement
1988-04-13	↳ Dan County	↳ Dan County	transferred	Civil Affairs Announcement
1988-04-13	↳ Baisha County (Aut.)	↳ Baisha County (Aut.)	transferred	Civil Affairs Announcement
1988-04-13	↳ Changjiang County (Aut.)	↳ Changjiang County (Aut.)	transferred	Civil Affairs Announcement
1988-04-13	↳ Ledong County (Aut.)	↳ Ledong County (Aut.)	transferred	Civil Affairs Announcement
1988-04-13	↳ Lingshui County (Aut.)	↳ Lingshui County (Aut.)	transferred	Civil Affairs Announcement
1988-04-13	↳ Baoting County (Aut.)	↳ Baoting County (Aut.)	transferred	Civil Affairs Announcement
1988-04-13	↳ Qiongzhong County (Aut.)	↳ Qiongzhong County (Aut.)	transferred	Civil Affairs Announcement
1988-04-13	↳ Dongfang County (Aut.)	↳ Dongfang County (Aut.)	transferred	Civil Affairs Announcement
1988-04-13	↳ Paracels, Spratlys, and Zhongsha Islands; Authority (CL-Administration Office)	↳ Paracels, Spratlys, and Zhongsha Islands; Authority (CL-Administration Office)	transferred	Civil Affairs Announcement
1990-01-04	Luohu District Office	Luohu District	established	Civil Affairs [1990]2
1990-01-04	Futian District Office	Futian District	established	Civil Affairs [1990]2
1990-01-04	Nantou District Office	Nanshan District	established	Civil Affairs [1990]2
1990-01-04	Shatoujiao District Office	Nanshan District	established	Civil Affairs [1990]2
1991-06-22	Yangdong District	Yangdong County	reorganized	Civil Affairs [1991]19
1991-09-14	parts of Jiao District, Shantou	Longhu District	merged & established	Civil Affairs [1991]53
1991-09-14	parts of Jinsha District	Longhu District	merged & established	Civil Affairs [1991]53
1991-09-14	parts of Jinsha District	Jinyaun District	merged & established	Civil Affairs [1991]53
1991-09-14	parts of Gongyuan District	Jinyaun District	merged & established	Civil Affairs [1991]53
1991-09-14	Anping District	Shengping District	merged & established	Civil Affairs [1991]53
1991-09-14	Tongping District	Shengping District	merged & established	Civil Affairs [1991]53
1991-09-14	parts of Gongyuan District	Shengping District	merged & established	Civil Affairs [1991]53
1991-09-14	parts of Jinsha District	Shengping District	merged & established	Civil Affairs [1991]53
1991-09-14	parts of Jiao District, Shantou	Shengping District	merged & established	Civil Affairs [1991]53
1991-12-07	parts of Shantou (PL-City)	Chaozhou (PL-City)	established	State Council [1991]84
1991-12-07	↳ Chaozhou (CL-City)	↳ Xiangqiao District	transferred & reorganized	State Council [1991]84
1991-12-07	↳ Chaozhou (CL-City)	↳ Chao'an County	transferred & established	State Council [1991]84
1991-12-07	↳ Raoping County	↳ Raoping County	transferred	State Council [1991]84
1991-12-07	parts of Shantou (PL-City)	Jieyang (PL-City)	established	State Council [1991]84
1991-12-07	↳ Jieyang County	↳ Rongcheng District	transferred & reorganized	State Council [1991]84
1991-12-07	↳ Jieyang County	↳ Jiedong County	transferred & established	State Council [1991]84
1991-12-07	↳ Jiexi County	↳ Jiexi County	transferred	State Council [1991]84
1991-12-07	↳ Huilai County	↳ Huilai County	transferred	State Council [1991]84
1991-12-07	↳ Puning County	↳ Puning County	transferred	State Council [1991]84
1992-03-26	Shunde County	Shunde (CL-City)	reorganized	Civil Affairs [1992]32
1992-04-17	Taishan County	Taishan (CL-City)	reorganized	Civil Affairs [1992]41
1992-05-18	Jiao District, Qingyuan	Qingxin County	reorganized	Civil Affairs [1992]47
1992-05-20	Panyu County	Panyu (CL-City)	reorganized	Civil Affairs [1992]49
1992-09-02	Nanhai County	Nanhai (CL-City)	reorganized	Civil Affairs [1992]98
1992-09-03	Yunfu County	Yunfu (CL-City)	reorganized	Civil Affairs [1992]99
1992-10-08	Xinhui County	Xinhui (CL-City)	reorganized	Civil Affairs [1992]112
1992-11-11	Bao'an County	Bao'an District	disestablished & established	Civil Affairs [1992]140
1992-11-11	Bao'an County	Longgang District	disestablished & established	Civil Affairs [1992]140
1993-01-05	Kaiping County	Kaiping (CL-City)	reorganized	Civil Affairs [1993]1
1993-03-29	Sanshui County	Sanshui (CL-City)	reorganized	Civil Affairs [1993]68
1993-04-06	Puning County	Puning (CL-City)	reorganized	Civil Affairs [1993]71
1993-04-08	Luoding County	Luoding (CL-City)	reorganized	Civil Affairs [1993]72
1993-04-09	Chaoyang County	Chaoyang (CL-City)	reorganized	Civil Affairs [1993]78
1993-06-08	Gaozhou County	Gaozhou (CL-City)	reorganized	Civil Affairs [1993]126
1993-06-18	Hua County	Huadu (CL-City)	reorganized	
1993-09-28	Gaoyao County	Gaoyao (CL-City)	reorganized	Civil Affairs [1993]190
1993-11-08	Heshan County	Heshan (CL-City)	reorganized	Civil Affairs [1993]208
1993-11-08	Jiao District, Heyuan	Dongyuan County	reorganized	Civil Affairs [1993]209
1993-11-25	Sihui County	Sihui (CL-City)	reorganized	Civil Affairs [1993]236
1993-12-08	Zengcheng County	Zengcheng (CL-City)	reorganized	Civil Affairs [1993]239
1993-12-10	Lianjiang County	Lianjiang (CL-City)	reorganized	Civil Affairs [1993]241
1994-01-12	Yingde County	Yingde (CL-City)	reorganized	Civil Affairs [1994]3
1994-02-28	Enping County	Enping (CL-City)	reorganized	Civil Affairs [1994]33
1994-03-26	Conghua County	Conghua (CL-City)	reorganized	Civil Affairs [1994]48
1994-04-05	parts of Zhaoqing (PL-City)	Yunfu (PL-City)	established	State Council [1994]24
1994-04-05	↳ Yunfu (CL-City)	↳ Yuncheng District	transferred & reorganized	State Council [1994]24
1994-04-05	↳ Xinxing County	↳ Xinxing County	transferred	State Council [1994]24
1994-04-05	↳ Yunan County	↳ Yunan County	transferred	State Council [1994]24
1994-04-05	↳ Luoding (CL-City)	↳ Luoding (CL-City)	transferred	State Council [1994]24
1994-04-18	Chenghai County	Chenghai (CL-City)	reorganized	Civil Affairs [1994]56
1994-04-18	Gaoming County	Gaoming (CL-City)	reorganized	Civil Affairs [1994]57
1994-04-22	Lian County	Lianzhou (CL-City)	reorganized	Civil Affairs [1994]59
1994-04-25	parts of Chaoyang (CL-City)	Hepu District	established	State Council [1994]35
1994-04-26	Haikang County	Leizhou (CL-City)	reorganized	Civil Affairs [1994]64
1994-04-28	Lechang County	Lechang (CL-City)	reorganized	Civil Affairs [1994]66
1994-05-05	Yangchun County	Yangchun (CL-City)	reorganized	Civil Affairs [1994]67
1994-05-06	Huiyang County	Huiyang (CL-City)	reorganized	Civil Affairs [1994]68
1994-05-26	Wuchuan County	Wuchuan (CL-City)	reorganized	Civil Affairs [1994]84
1994-06-06	Xingning County	Xingning (CL-City)	reorganized	Civil Affairs [1994]89
1994-07-04	Huazhou County	Huazhou (CL-City)	reorganized	Civil Affairs [1994]95
1994-08-10	Cheng District, Jiangmen	Jianghai District	renamed	Civil Affairs [1994]119
1994-10-10	Jiao District, Zhanjiang	Mazhang District	renamed	
1995-01-19	Lufeng County	Lufeng (CL-City)	reorganized	Civil Affairs [1995]5
1995-09-11	Xinyi County	Xinyi (CL-City)	reorganized	Civil Affairs [1995]62
1996-01-09	parts of Yuncheng District	Yun'an County	established	Civil Affairs [1996]1
1996-06-17	Nanxiong County	Nanxiong (CL-City)	reorganized	Civil Affairs [1996]46
1997-10-21	parts of Luohu District	Yantian District	established	State Council [1997]97
2000-05-21	Panyu (CL-City)	Panyu District	reorganized	State Council [2000]44
2000-05-21	Huadu (CL-City)	Huadu District	reorganized	State Council [2000]44
2001-01-22	parts of Dianbai County	Maogang District	established	State Council [2001]11
2001-04-04	Doumen County	Doumen District	reorganized	State Council [2001]35
2001-04-04	parts of Doumen County	Jinwan District	established	State Council [2001]35
2001-04-04	parts of Xiangzhou District	Jinwan District	established	State Council [2001]35
2002-06-22	Xinhui (CL-City)	Xinhui District	reorganized	State Council [2002]56
2002-12-08	Cheng District, Foshan	Chancheng District	renamed	State Council [2002]109
2002-12-08	Shiwan District	Chancheng District	merged & established	State Council [2002]109
2002-12-08	Nanhai (CL-City)	Nanhai District	reorganized	State Council [2002]109
2002-12-08	Shunde (CL-City)	Shunde District	reorganized	State Council [2002]109
2002-12-08	Sanshui (CL-City)	Sanshui District	reorganized	State Council [2002]109
2002-12-08	Gaoming (CL-City)	Gaoming District	reorganized	State Council [2002]109
2003-01-29	Shengping District	Jinping District	merged & established	State Council [2003]11
2003-01-29	Jinyuan District	Jinping District	merged & established	State Council [2003]11
2003-01-29	Hepu District	Haojiang District	merged & established	State Council [2003]11
2003-01-29	Dahao District	Haojiang District	merged & established	State Council [2003]11
2003-01-29	Chaoyang (CL-City)	Chaoyang District	reorganized	State Council [2003]11
2003-01-29	Chaoyang (CL-City)	Chaonan District	established	State Council [2003]11
2003-01-29	Chenghai (CL-City)	Chenghai District	reorganized	State Council [2003]11
2003-03-06	Huiyang (CL-City)	Huiyang District	reorganized	State Council [2003]36
2004-05-29	Qujiang County	Qujiang District	reorganized	State Council [2004]40
2004-05-29	Beijiang District	Qujiang District	merged into	State Council [2004]40
2005-04-28	Dongshan District	Yuexiu District	merged into	State Council [2005]35
2005-04-28	Fangcun District	Liwan District	merged into	State Council [2005]35
2005-04-28	parts of Panyu District	Nansha District	established	State Council [2005]35
2005-04-28	parts of Baiyun District	Luogang District	merged & established	State Council [2005]35
2005-04-28	parts of Huangpu District	Luogang District	merged & established	State Council [2005]35
2012-11-15	Qingxin County	Qingxin District	reorganized	State Council [2012]192
2012-12-17	Jiedong County	Jiedong District	reorganized	State Council [2012]207
2013-06-28	Chao'an County	Chao'an District	reorganized	State Council [2013]74
2013-10-18	Mei County	Meixian District	reorganized	State Council [2013]113
2014-01-25	Luogang District	Huangpu District	merged into	State Council [2014]11
2014-01-25	Conghua (CL-City)	Conghua District	reorganized	State Council [2014]11
2014-01-25	Zengcheng (CL-City)	Zengcheng District	reorganized	State Council [2014]11
2014-01-25	Dianbai County	Dianbai District	reorganized	State Council [2014]12
2014-01-25	Maogang District	Dianbai District	merged into	State Council [2014]12
2014-09-09	Yun'an County	Yun'an District	reorganized	State Council [2014]120
2014-10-20	Yangdong County	Yangdong District	reorganized	State Council [2014]141
2015-04-29	Gaoyao (CL-City)	Gaoyao District	reorganized	State Council [2015]76
2016-09-14	parts of Bao'an District	Longhua District	established	State Council [2016]155
2016-09-14	parts of Longgang District	Pingshan District	established	State Council [2016]155
2018-02-09	parts of Bao'an District	Guangming District	established	State Council [2018]25

== Population composition ==
=== Prefectures ===
Prefecture	2010	2000
Qingyuan	3,698,394	3,147,679
Shaoguan	2,826,612	2,735,122
Heyuan	2,953,019	2,265,155
Meizhou	4,240139	3,802009
Chaozhou	2,669,844	2,402,201
Zhaoqing	3,918,085	3,371,417
Yunfu	2,360,128	2,152,915
Foshan	7,194,311	5,337,888
Guangzhou	12,700,800	9,943,000
Dongguan	8,220,237	6,445,700
Huizhou	4,597,002	3,216,343
Shanwei	2,935,717	2,453,084
Jieyang	5,877,025	5,237,400
Shantou	5,391,028	4,671,086
Zhanjiang	6,993,304	6,072,884
Maoming	5,817,753	5,239,664
Yangjiang	2,421,812	2,170,401
Jiangmen	4,448,871	3,950,275
Zhongshan	3,120,884	2,363,542
Zhuhai	1,560,229	1,235,582
Shenzhen	10,357,938	7,008,428

=== Counties ===
Name	Prefecture	2010
Liwan	Guangzhou	898,204
Yuexiu	Guangzhou	1,157,277
Haizhu	Guangzhou	1,558,663
Tianhe	Guangzhou	1,432,431
Baiyun	Guangzhou	2,222,658
Huangpu	Guangzhou	831,600
Panyu	Guangzhou	1,764,869
Huadu	Guangzhou	945,053
Nansha	Guangzhou	259,899
Zengcheng	Guangzhou	1,036,731
Conghua	Guangzhou	593,415
Luohu	Shenzhen	923,423
Futian	Shenzhen	1,318,055
Nanshan	Shenzhen	1,087,936
Bao'an	Shenzhen	4,017,807
Guangming	Shenzhen	481,420
Longhua	Shenzhen	not established
Longgang	Shenzhen	2,011,225
Pingshan	Shenzhen	309,211
Dapeng	Shenzhen	not established
Yantian	Shenzhen	208,861
Doumen	Zhuhai	415,854
Jinwan	Zhuhai	251,783
Xiangzhou	Zhuhai	892,592
Longhu	Shantou	536,102
Jinping	Shantou	810,606
Haojiang	Shantou	267,597
Chaoyang	Shantou	1,626,641
Chaonan	Shantou	1,290,922
Chenghai	Shantou	798,896
Nan'ao	Shantou	60,264
Chancheng	Foshan	1,101,077
Nanhai	Foshan	2,588,844
Shunde	Foshan	2,461,701
Gaoming	Foshan	420,044
Sanshui	Foshan	622,645
Pengjiang	Jiangmen	719,120
Jianghai	Jiangmen	254,365
Xinhui	Jiangmen	849,155
Taishan	Jiangmen	941,087
Kaiping	Jiangmen	697,395
Heshan	Jiangmen	494,935
Enping	Jiangmen	492,814
Wujiang	Shaoguan	294,620
Zhenjiang	Shaoguan	393,526
Qujiang	Shaoguan	303,377
Shixing	Shaoguan	205,553
Renhua	Shaoguan	200,356
Wengyuan	Shaoguan	331,319
Ruyuan	Shaoguan	177,471
Xinfeng	Shaoguan	206,108
Lechang	Shaoguan	398,103
Nanxiong	Shaoguan	316,179
Chikan	Zhanjiang	303,824
Xiashan	Zhanjiang	487,093
Potou	Zhanjiang	333,239
Mazhang	Zhanjiang	487,712
Suixi	Zhanjiang	886,452
Xuwen	Zhanjiang	698,474
Lianjiang	Zhanjiang	1,443,099
Leizhou	Zhanjiang	1,427,664
Wuchuan	Zhanjiang	927,275
Huicheng	Huizhou	1,579,691
Huiyang	Huizhou	764,816
Boluo	Huizhou	1,038,198
Huidong	Huizhou	907,229
Longmen	Huizhou	307,068
Meijiang	Meizhou	380,774
Mei(xian)→Meixian	Meizhou	554,745
Dabu	Meizhou	374,731
Fengshun	Meizhou	479,025
Wuhua	Meizhou	1,052,256
Pingyuan	Meizhou	229,863
Jiaoling	Meizhou	205,862
Xingning	Meizhou	962,883
Maonan	Maoming	820,934
Dianbai	Maoming	1,218,724
Gaozhou	Maoming	1,288,724
Huazhou	Maoming	1,615,505
Xinyi	Maoming	913,717
Duanzhou	Zhaoqing	479,344
Dinghu	Zhaoqing	164,701
Gaoyao	Zhaoqing	753,357
Guangning	Zhaoqing	424,128
Huaiji	Zhaoqing	814,172
Fengkai	Zhaoqing	398,304
Deqing	Zhaoqing	341,197
Sihui	Zhaoqing	542,882
Cheng(qu)	Shanwei	491,766
Haifeng	Shanwei	804,107
Luhe	Shanwei	314,153
Lufeng	Shanwei	1,688,536
Yuancheng	Heyuan	464,847
Zijin	Heyuan	640,438
Lungchuan	Heyuan	695,680
Lianping	Heyuan	337,172
Heping	Heyuan	374,425
Dongyuan	Heyuan	440,457
Jiangcheng	Yangjiang	676,858
Yangdong	Yangjiang	442,786
Yangxi	Yangjiang	452,663
Yangchun	Yangjiang	849,505
Qingcheng	Qingyuan	810,971
Fogang	Qingyuan	302,782
Yangshan	Qingyuan	356,071
Lianshan	Qingyuan	90,375
Liannan	Qingyuan	129,207
Qingxin	Qingyuan	698,826
Yingde	Qingyuan	942,303
Lianzhou	Qingyuan	367,859
Xiangqiao	Chaozhou	452,472
Chao'an	Chaozhou	1,335,398
Raoping	Chaozhou	881,974
Rongcheng	Jieyang	741,674
Jiedong	Jieyang	1,157,720
Jiexi	Jieyang	825,313
Huilai	Jieyang	1,097,615
Puning	Jieyang	2,054,703
Yuncheng	Yunfu	314,188
Yun'an	Yunfu	269,736
Xinxing	Yunfu	428,410
Yunan	Yunfu	388,727
Luoding	Yunfu	959,067
Maogang (disestablished)	Maoming	396,781
