= DQY =

DQY may refer to:

- Orthotrichaceae, a family of mosses, by Catalogue of Life identifier
- Deqing County, Guangdong, a county in Zhaoqing, Guangdong province, China; see List of administrative divisions of Guangdong
