= Binhai (disambiguation) =

Binhai, officially Binhai New Area, is a state-level new area in Tianjin.

Binhai (simplified Chinese: 滨海; traditional Chinese: 濱海) may refer to:

- Binhai County, a county of Yancheng, Jiangsu, China
- Binhai Area, Dongguan, Guangdong, China
