= 2014 crackdown on prostitution in Dongguan =

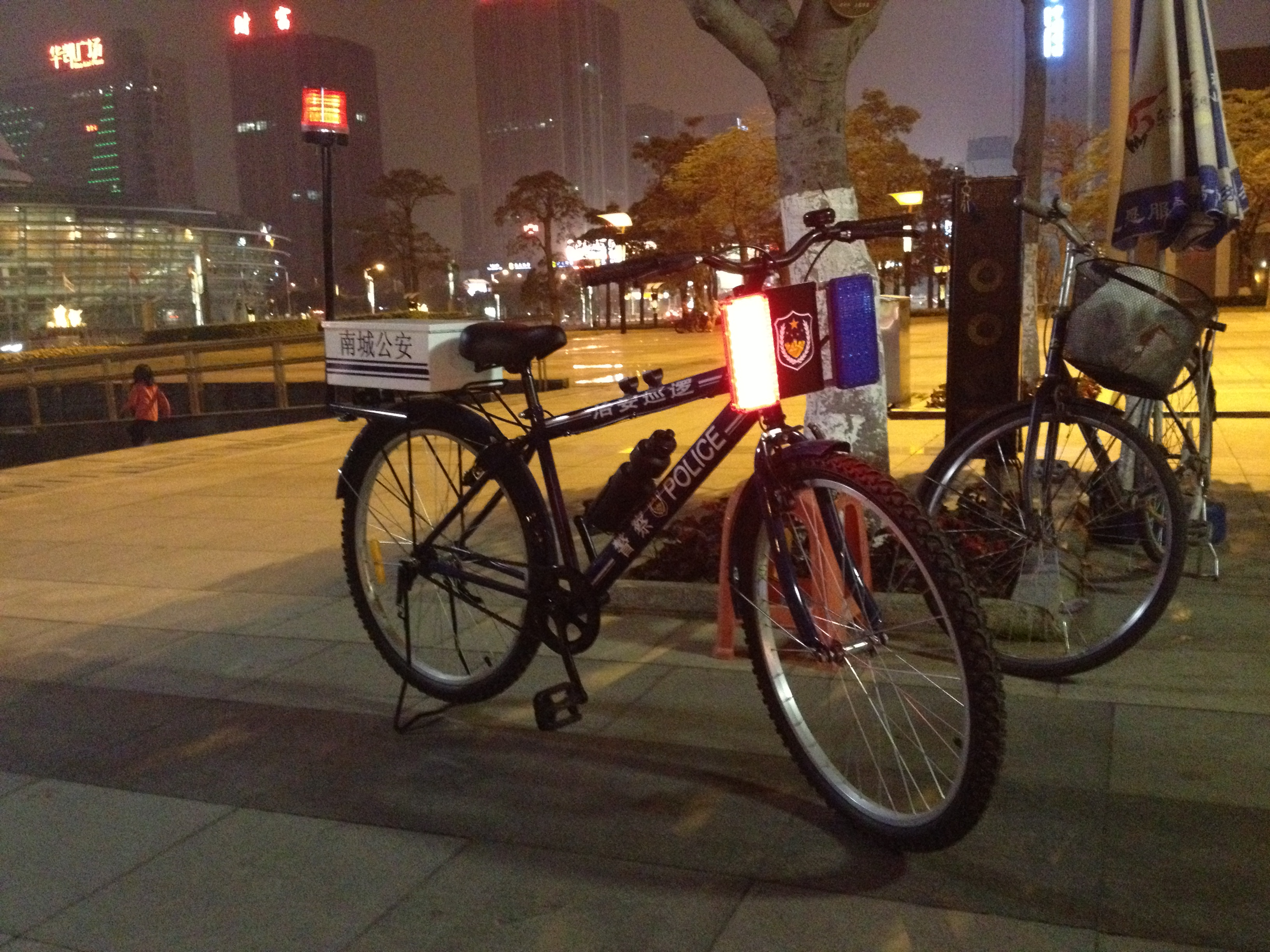
Police bicycles in Dongguan around the time of the crackdown.

On February 9, 2014, prostitution in Dongguan, China was exposed by the media and led to a large-scale crackdown on prostitution in entertainment venues by the authorities. The anti-prostitution operation was launched on the afternoon of February 9, 2014, by the Dongguan Municipal Government, the Dongguan Municipal Party Committee and the Dongguan Public Security Bureau after being exposed by a reporter from China Central Television (CCTV). A total of 6,525 police officers were mobilized. After the news of the anti-prostitution operation was reported, public opinion was in uproar. This incident has attracted much attention from the public and has caused great controversy. The issues of public security and privacy, entertainment economy and other benefits and disadvantages involved in the incident are very extensive and complex, and supporters and opponents were polarized.

Following the crackdown on prostitution in Dongguan, China banned brothels nationwide. Taking Guangdong as an example, on February 10, Guangdong Proviordered public security organs throughout the province to organize a three-month crackdown on prostitution to completely eliminate prostitution-related activities in entertainment venues. Among them, Guangzhou arrested 98 suspects of various illegal and criminal activities.

== Background ==
Located in the Pearl River Delta region of China, with a high degree of openness to the outside world, a large floating population, and good climate conditions, Dongguan has a developed economy, especially the service industry. Dongguan was also famous for its "Dongguan-style service". Hotels, bars, guesthouses, KTVs and other entertainment venues are gathered here, and they receive a wide range of tourists from mainland China, Hong Kong, Macao and overseas. Since the reform and opening up of mainland China, the sex industry in Dongguan entertainment venues has existed and developed for many years. Its sex industry has also developed due to the development of the service industry, and most entertainment venues provide sex services. Since the Chinese laws explicitly prohibit prostitution, Dongguan entertainment venues have been raided and inspected many times. Dongguan's sex industry mainly relies on the protection and support of the government and public security authorities to develop. It is said that this operation has cracked down on the service industry business of no less than 10 billion yuan, and the economic growth was greatly impacted. Dongguan was ridiculed by Chinese netizens as the "sex capital" because of its developed sex industry.

== Investigation ==
On the morning of February 9, 2014, the China Central Television (CCTV) spent several tens of minutes broadcasting footage of more than 10 entertainment venues in Dongguan that the station's reporters had secretly filmed.The report and explanation were detailed. The CCTV report attracted widespread attention as soon as it was broadcast. That afternoon, Hu Chunhua, secretary of the Guangdong Provincial Party Committee, issued an instruction, requiring a comprehensive investigation of the entire city of Dongguan, and said, "First treat the symptoms, then the root cause."

Subsequently, the Dongguan authorities dispatched 6,525 police officers to conduct the first round of investigations. In the first round of investigations, the Dongguan Municipal Public Security Bureau and five branch bureaus established special task forces to investigate and rectify 12 entertainment venues in five towns exposed by CCTV at 3 pm that day. The Dongguan Municipal Party Committee also issued warnings to the main leaders and leaders in charge of the five towns of Zhongtang, Huangjiang, Humen, Fenggang and Houjie. The first round of investigations continued until the early morning of the next day. The police carried out a carpet search and arrested many customers and prostitutes. In this investigation, the police arrested a total of 67 people. This attracted widespread attention from the media and netizens.

=== Ministry of Public Security ===
On February 10, 2014, according to publicly available information from the Chinese government, the Ministry of Public Security dispatched a supervisory team led by the director of the Public Security Administration Bureau and including personnel from the Supervision and Inspection Departments to Guangdong Province to guide and supervise the handling of cases, rectification of problems, and accountability. This resulted in the suspension of several officials, and the Ministry of Public Security ordered the investigation of local public security officials and a thorough investigation of the supporters and protectors behind the sex industry in Dongguan. Many entertainment venues were temporarily shut down.

=== Aftermath ===
After the police crackdown, the sex industry in Dongguan came to a standstill, and all aspects of Dongguan were affected to varying degrees. Many media outlets, including CCTV, conducted follow-up visits. According to Ta Kung Pao, the authorities' crackdown on prostitution caused the sex industry chain to break down, affecting employment. 200,000 people may have to find other ways to make a living. After the incident, Dongguan's economy was generally considered to have been severely impacted. Caixin reported that after the crackdown, Dongguan's hotel industry had been severely affected. After this crackdown, many officials who went to Dongguan to solicit prostitutes were gradually exposed by the media. According to Jiangxi.com, on February 10, the Fifth Engineering Company of China Railway Bridge Bureau Group reported on the situation of the Audi car "Gan GA4389" that had been followed by the media and attracted much attention. The car involved was a public vehicle of the company's Hong Kong-Zhuhai-Macau Bridge Project Section 1 Engineering Office in Zhuhai. The people involved were investigated and dealt with. In addition, Apple Daily published a report on its front page on February 12 entitled "A group of police officers seeking pleasure ran into police officers who were arrested during a crackdown on prostitution", stating that at least one active-duty Hong Kong police officer had been administratively detained by the authorities. The Hong Kong Police Force issued a statement on the same day, stating that the title and content of the above report were inconsistent with the facts. The Police Force stated that it had responded to Apple Daily's inquiry on February 11, pointing out that after checking with the relevant authorities in Dongguan, it was confirmed that no Hong Kong police officers were arrested in the operation, nor had it received any reports of Hong Kong police officers being arrested in Dongguan.

On February 10, 2014, a computer virus falsely claimed to contain videos of pornographic services in Dongguan on the Chinese Internet, and fraudulent text messages also appeared frequently. On February 14, the Chinese government announced that the Standing Committee of the Guangdong Provincial Party Committee had decided to remove Yan Xiaokang from his positions as Vice Mayor of Dongguan and Director of the Dongguan Public Security Bureau, and to handle the matter in accordance with relevant laws and regulations. The government said that this had caused a bad influence at home and abroad.

On July 29, 2014, 80% of entertainment venues in Dongguan had resumed business in accordance with the law. At present, there are 1,134 venues of the three types that have resumed business, including 465 KTVs and 631 foot massage parlors. The resumption rate of KTVs and foot massage parlors reached 80%. There were originally 198 saunas, but only 38 have resumed business. During the five-month anti-prostitution campaign, the city's public security organs cracked down on 281 criminal cases involving prostitution, investigated and dealt with 530 public security cases involving prostitution, arrested 700 criminal suspects, and dealt with 1,552 people who violated regulations. On the same day, the governments of 32 towns and streets in Dongguan, as well as the management committees of Songshan Lake and Ecological Park, and the actual operators of 2,684 saunas, karaoke bars, foot massage parlors, and hotels held a warning talk meeting on cracking down on prostitution issues at the local public security bureaus. At the meeting, the "strictest ever" ten regulations were announced to eliminate ten types of prostitution-related hidden dangers in the three types of venues:

1. Rooms: Enclosed suites are not allowed within the premises.
2. Bed: Massage beds must not be placed in the room where you can enjoy foot baths, beauty treatments, or body treatments.
3. Locks: No door locks, bolts, or other devices that would impede the free entry and exit of others are permitted in the room.
4. Lighting: Adjustable brightness lighting is not allowed in rooms and private booths, and it must not be turned off during business hours.
5. Windows: The height and dimensions of transparent doors and windows installed on the doors of rooms and private rooms must meet the requirements and must not be obstructed.
6. Bells: No signal lights, bells, or other remote-controlled devices or equipment shall be installed in the premises for the purpose of evading or obstructing routine inspections.
7. Video surveillance is installed at entrances and exits, reception halls, cash registers, etc., and connected to the public security backend.
8. Personnel: Employees should dress neatly and appropriately, and should not be indecent. Employees should be registered and managed under their real names.
9. Note: Entertainment venues need to obtain a business license from the industry and commerce department.
10. License: Venues must obtain a public place hygiene license and other relevant permits in accordance with relevant laws and regulations before they can operate.

Furthermore, if an entertainment venue is found to be involved in prostitution, it will be dealt with severely and will be "immediately and decisively eliminated."

On February 4, 2016, Liu Zhigeng, the former secretary of the CCP Dongguan Municipal Committee, was dismissed from his post. According to media reports, the crackdown on prostitution in Dongguan was related to the investigation by relevant departments into Liu Zhigeng's violations of discipline and law in Dongguan.

== Reactions ==
The incident has attracted widespread attention from the public, including netizens, local media, Beijing official media, and even international media. Some media outlets reported that the Chinese government may be taking this opportunity to expose the corrupt officials behind the scenes, while overseas Chinese media pointed out that this corrupt official is likely Zhou Yongkang and his oil clique. Media person Yang Qinglin believes that "Dongguan's crackdown on prostitution is ostensibly aimed at arresting prostitutes and their clients, but in reality, it is aimed at cracking down on the protective umbrella of the political and legal system behind them." He also declared: "A nationwide campaign to rectify the protective umbrella of the political and legal system under the guise of cracking down on prostitution is about to begin!"
