= Guangdong University of Science and Technology =

Private university in Dongguan, China

Coordinates: 22.9693°N 113.7548°E

- 广东科技学院 (Chinese)
- Type: Private
- Established: 2003; 23 years ago
- Location: Dongguan
- Website: www.gdust.edu.cn

Chinese name
- Simplified Chinese: 广东科技学院
- Traditional Chinese: 廣東科技學院
Transcriptions
Standard Mandarin
- Hanyu Pinyin: Guǎngdōng Kējì Xuéyuàn
Yue: Cantonese
- Jyutping: gwong2 dung1 fo1 gei6 hok6 jyun6*2

Guangdong University of Science and Technology is a private university in Dongguan, Guangdong, China; it is on the south side of the city. It was established in 2003 by Nanbo Tech.

== Academics ==
The university applies international education concepts and, thus, keeps improving its teaching quality. The university cooperates with companies and established exchange programs with the Shu-Te University, St. John's University, and China University of Technology.

Moreover, the university set up some international programs for students, such as 2+2 and MBA1+1: half of the time is in China and the other half is study in one of the overseas universities. Cooperating universities include University of the Incarnate Word, George Fox University, Utica College. The advanced education concepts and systems lead them to a higher position among universities in China.

From 2007 to 2012, the university received a handful of awards from the city levels, province levels and the national levels of professional technique competition.

== Faculties ==
There are seven faculties: Computer Science, Arts, Engineering, Finance, Management, English and Basic.

- Computer science is mainly focused on software design, website design, graphic design and software technique. The quality of teaching is considered high because of the good quality of professors — some of them are from South China Normal University and South China University of Technology, which are of top universities in South China. Since 2009, the students receive over 100 awards from national levels of academic competition. In 2012, the first year student Zheng Lin won the first place of "Blue Bridge Cup" in Guangdong area, and the third place nationally.
- Faculty of Arts contain two departments: fashion and engineering, and fashion design. The university provides drawing rooms and cutting rooms for students. It established programs for the art students as well: Students can have internships in some big clothing companies.
- Engineering is one of the most important faculties. The professors train the students with hands-on projects and help them to learn techniques. Problem solving is a goal for teaching; the students will need to understand the process and be independent when problems exist.
- Finance is a faculty that started 2003. It includes financial management and financial engineering. The students can study a wild range of financial areas, includes accounting, investing, financing and economy. The students can use computer labs to practice the ways to handle numbers and data. Moreover, the university set up a program with some famous accounting firms outside of the school, to provide chances to learn skills and knowledge from society.
- The Faculty of Management involves three major departments: marketing, business management and general management. Most of the professors in this faculty had the experiences of studying overseas, which can provide students a worldwide view. The university will make plans for the students for their future occupation. Some companies will sign contracts with outstanding students before they graduate, to make sure they can get hired after university.
- Basic is a faculty that teaches math, Chinese, P.E., dancing and music.
- English is one of the most practical faculties in the university. It includes the two biggest areas of General English and Business English. The university established 21 labs on campus, five international business training rooms, eight language studios, one translation practicing room, and one simulation studio.

== Library ==
The university library has 1,100,000 books, 440,000 electronic books, and about 40,000 video resources.
