= Qingxi, Dongguan =

Qingxi 清溪镇
- Town
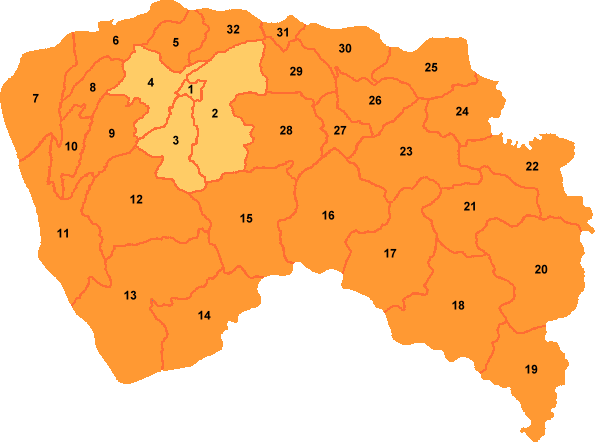
- Qingxi is labeled '20' on this map of Dongguan

- Location in Guangdong
- Coordinates: 22°50′41″N 114°09′51″E
- Country: People's Republic of China
- Province: Guangdong
- Prefecture-level city: Dongguan
- Time zone: UTC+8 (China Standard)

Qingxi (Chinese: 清溪; pinyin: Qīngxī) is an industrial town located in the southeastern part of Dongguan prefecture-level city, Guangdong Province, China.

== Geography ==
The town is situated in a somewhat mountainous region close to the Pearl River Delta. It is north of Shenzhen and southwest of Huizhou, and is approximately 60 kilometres (37 mi) from the border with Hong Kong. Qingxi has an area of 143 square kilometres (55 sq mi).

== History ==
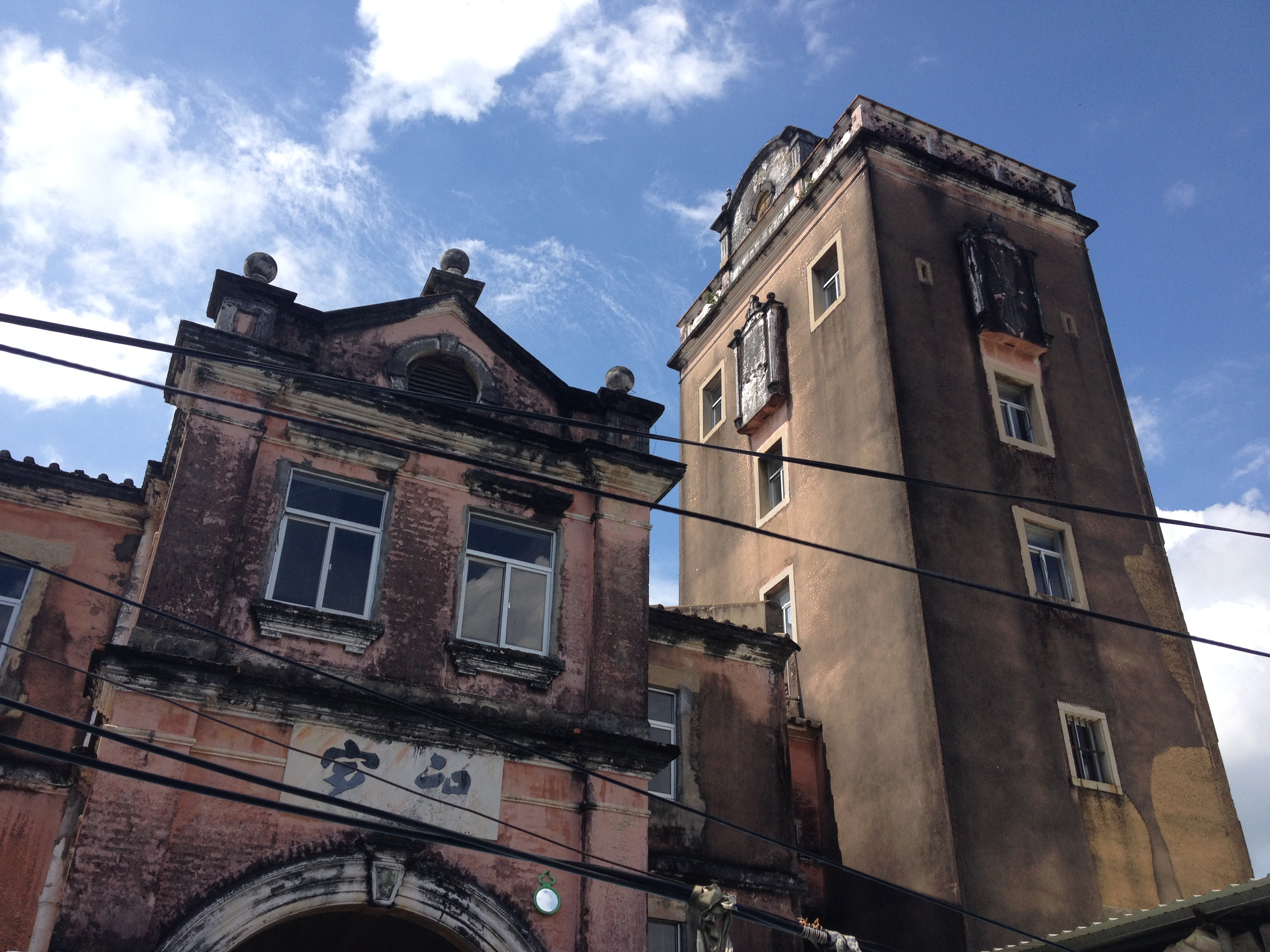
a Hakka tower in Qingxi Town

Qingxi has a cultural foundation based in its history of Hakka culture. Qingxi was at first a uninhabited mountainous place. 800 years ago, during the Hongwu period of the Ming dynasty, Hakka people began moving into Qingxi from the Central Plain. They were touched by the overlapping steep peaks surrounding the place, and the crystal clear stream coming out of the mouth of the Yinping Mountain. Deer drank water from the stream, and the place was given the name Qingxi, also known as Deer City. At first, Hakka people opened up wasteland in the remote mountainous regions where they lived in thatched shacks. Later, they gradually moved to plain areas down the hills. Struggling with nature for hundreds of years, they survived and multiplied until today.

== Infrastructure ==
30 years of construction and development after reform and opening-up rapidly transformed Qingxi from a remote village based on agriculture into a modern industrialized town. The town has convenient access to traffic, with over 1,000 kilometres (620 mi) of high-grade highway.

It has 4 transformer substations of 110 kV supplying 2 billion kW-hours yearly. It has four water works supplying 200,000 tons of water daily. The city boasts modern telecommunication buildings, post offices, public hospitals, schools, cable broadcasting and TV stations, and cultural centers.

Recent improvements include Qingxi Forest Park, featuring hiking trails along Qingxi mountain streams up to an 818-meter peak, and Qingxi Culture Park, a mid-town green-space along a stream featuring sports courts, walking paths and footbridges, and carnival rides.

== Economy ==
Economically, Qingxi has specialized in the electronics industry, particularly in high-tech areas such as the manufacture of computer monitors, motherboards, other computer peripherals, and children's products. According to the town's official website, foreign direct investment currently totals over US $2 billion, with some 800 foreign-funded enterprises investing in the area. Notable brands and factories in the town are LiteON, Kenwood & De'Longhi, Omron, Chicony, Phihong, FoxLink, and Ablelink. As of the first half of 2024, Qingxi's GDP amounted to 16.65 billion RMB.

Recent additions in the city include several hotels, supermarkets along with many new high-rise apartment buildings.

== Transportation ==
Daojiao will host 3 Dongguan Rail Transit stations under the current plans for construction of Line 4:

1. Qingxinan (Qingxi South
2. Qingxi
3. Qingxi Coach Terminal

There is a bus service from Qingxi to Shenzhen Bao'an International Airport in Shenzhen.
