= Dongbu Chanyeyuan Area =

Dongbu Chanyeyuan
- Designated area
- 东部产业园片区
- Country: People's Republic of China
- Province: Guangdong
- Prefecture-level city: Dongguan
- Time zone: UTC+8 (China Standard)

Dongbu Chanyeyuan Area (lit. Eastern Industrial Park Area) is a designated area for city planning of Dongguan, Guangdong province, China.
