= Songshanhu Area =

Songshanhu
- Designated area
- 松山湖片区
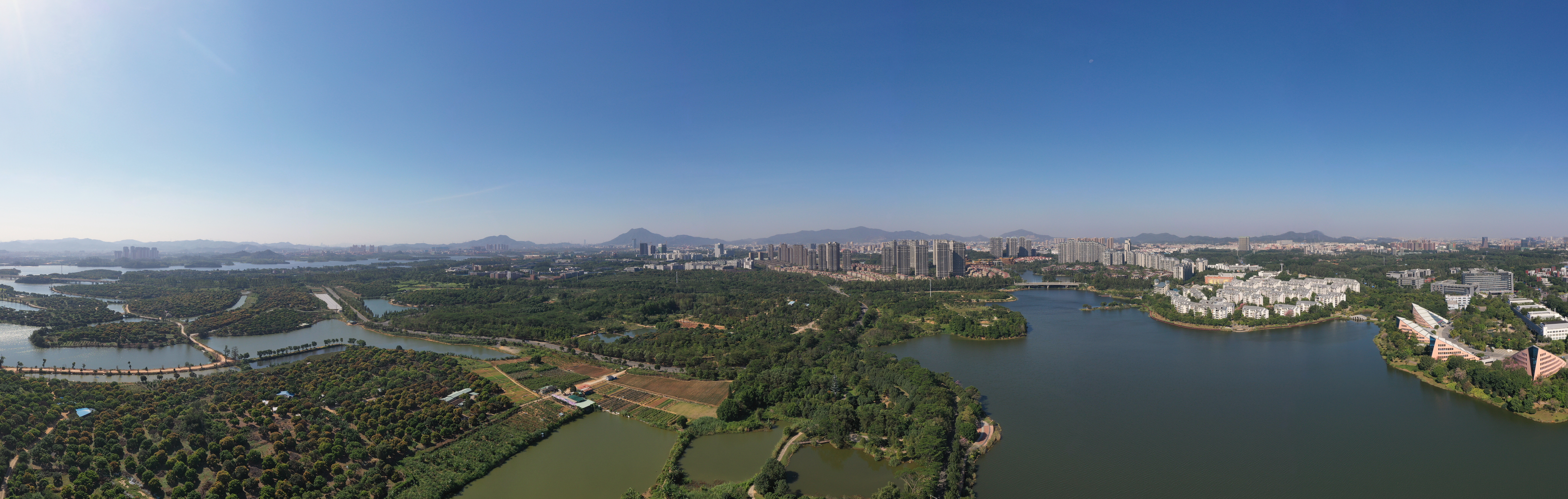
- Country: People's Republic of China
- Province: Guangdong
- Prefecture-level city: Dongguan
- Time zone: UTC+8 (China Standard)

Songshanhu (lit. Songshanhu Lake) is a designated area for city planning of Dongguan, Guangdong province, China.
