= Yuancheng, Heyuan =

Coordinates: 23.7333°N 114.683°E

Yuancheng 源城区
- District
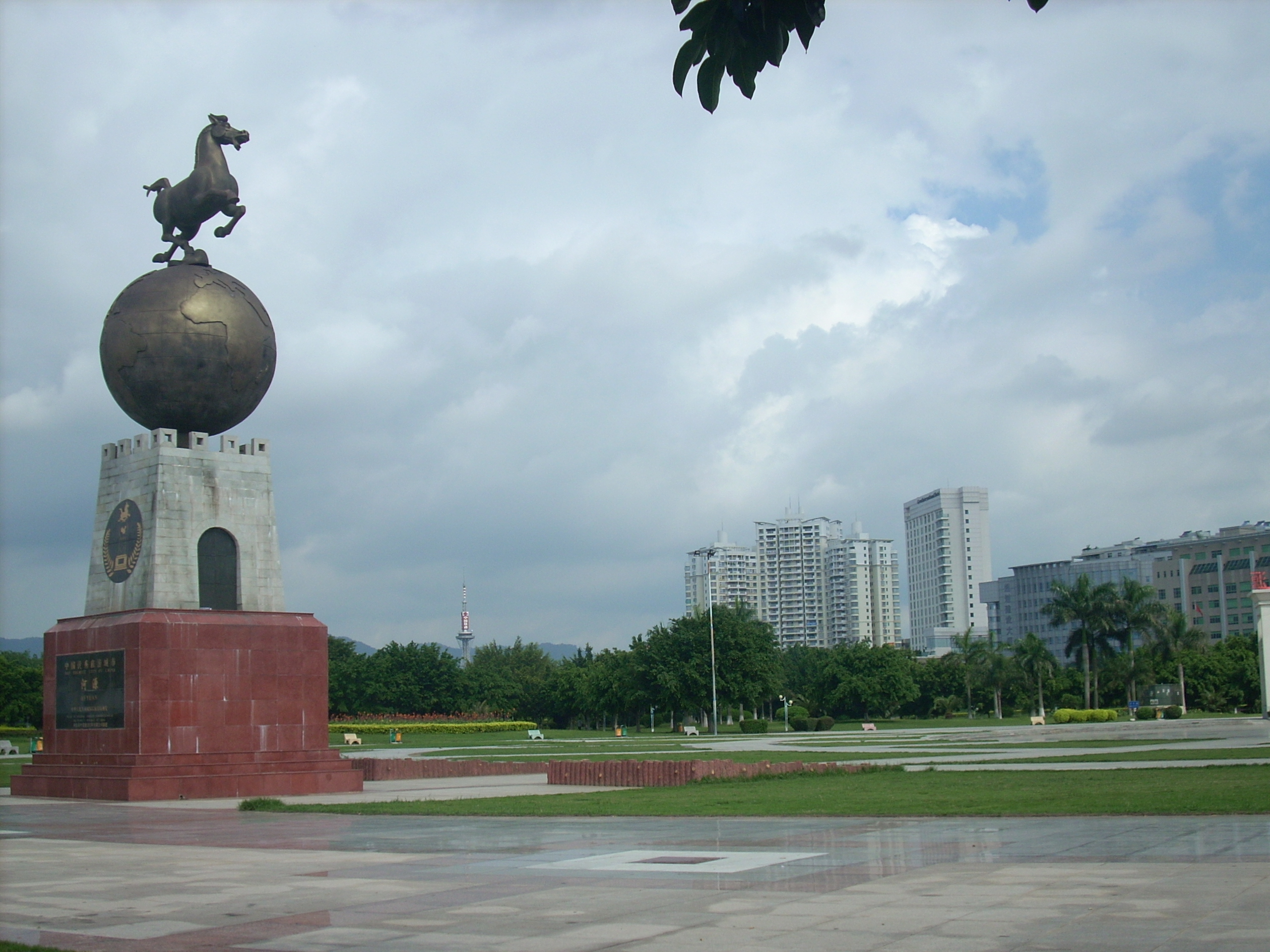

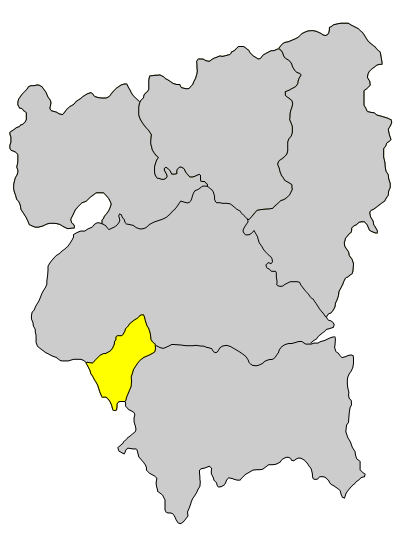
- Location in Heyuan

- Location of Heyuan in Guangdong
- Country: People's Republic of China
- Province: Guangdong
- Prefecture-level city: Heyuan

Area
  - Total: 365 km^{2} (141 sq mi)

Population (2020)
  - Total: 703,607
  - Density: 1,930/km^{2} (4,990/sq mi)
- Time zone: UTC+8 (China Standard)

Yuancheng (Chinese: 源城; pinyin: Yuánchéng) is the only district of the city of Heyuan, Guangdong Province, China.
