= Dongguan =

Dongguan 东莞市 Tungkun; Tungkuan
- Prefecture-level city
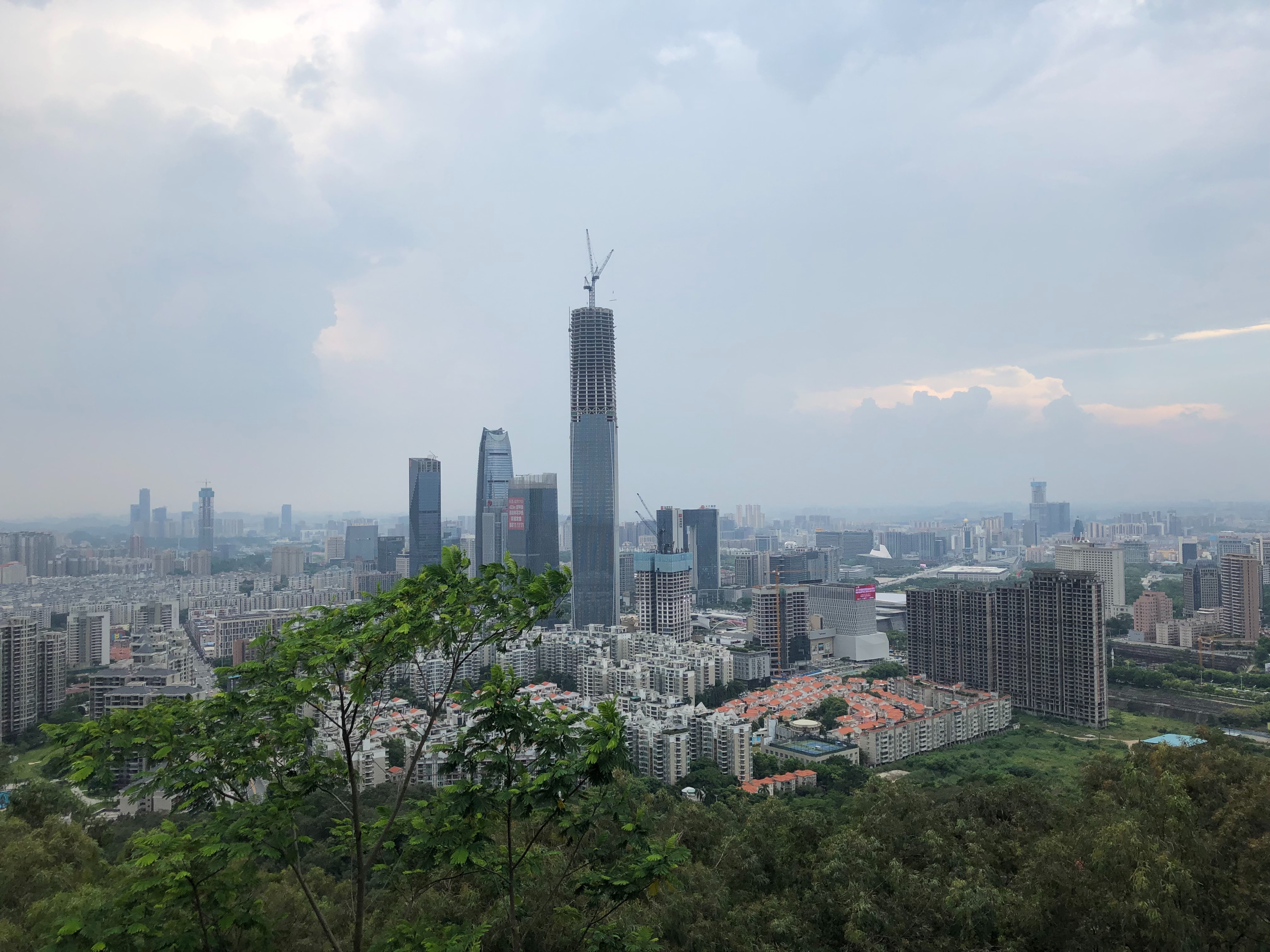
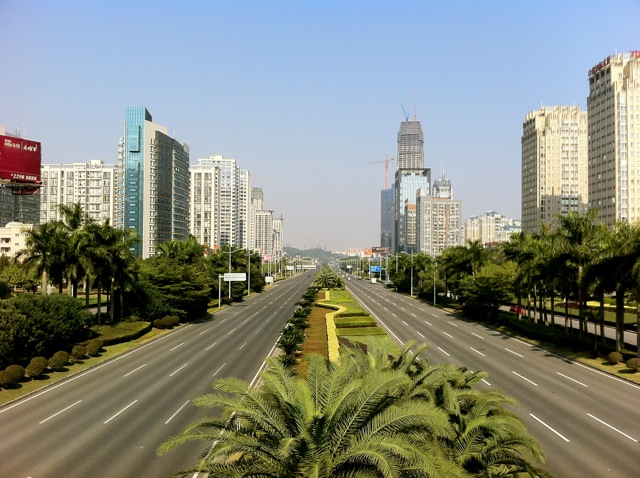
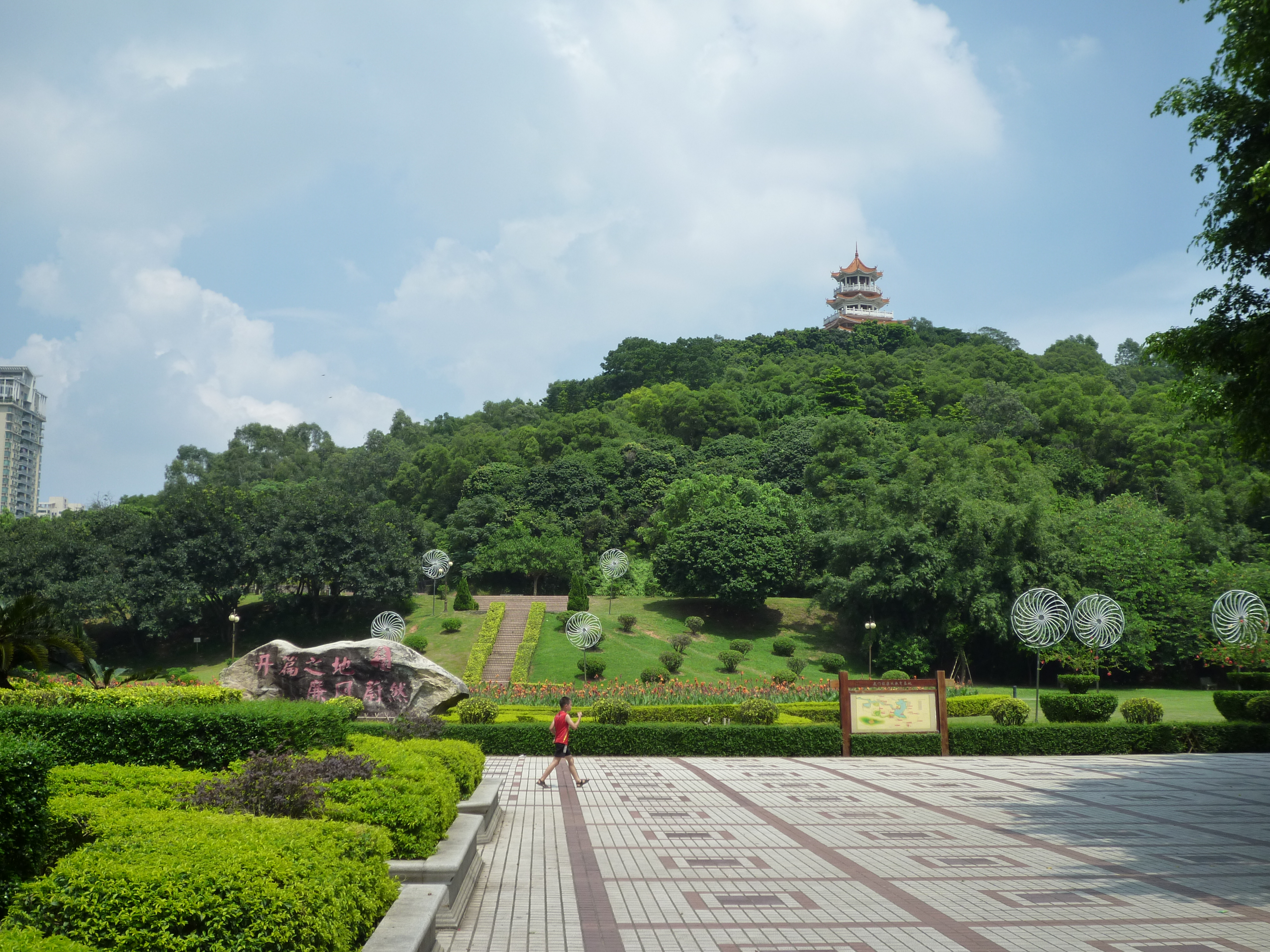
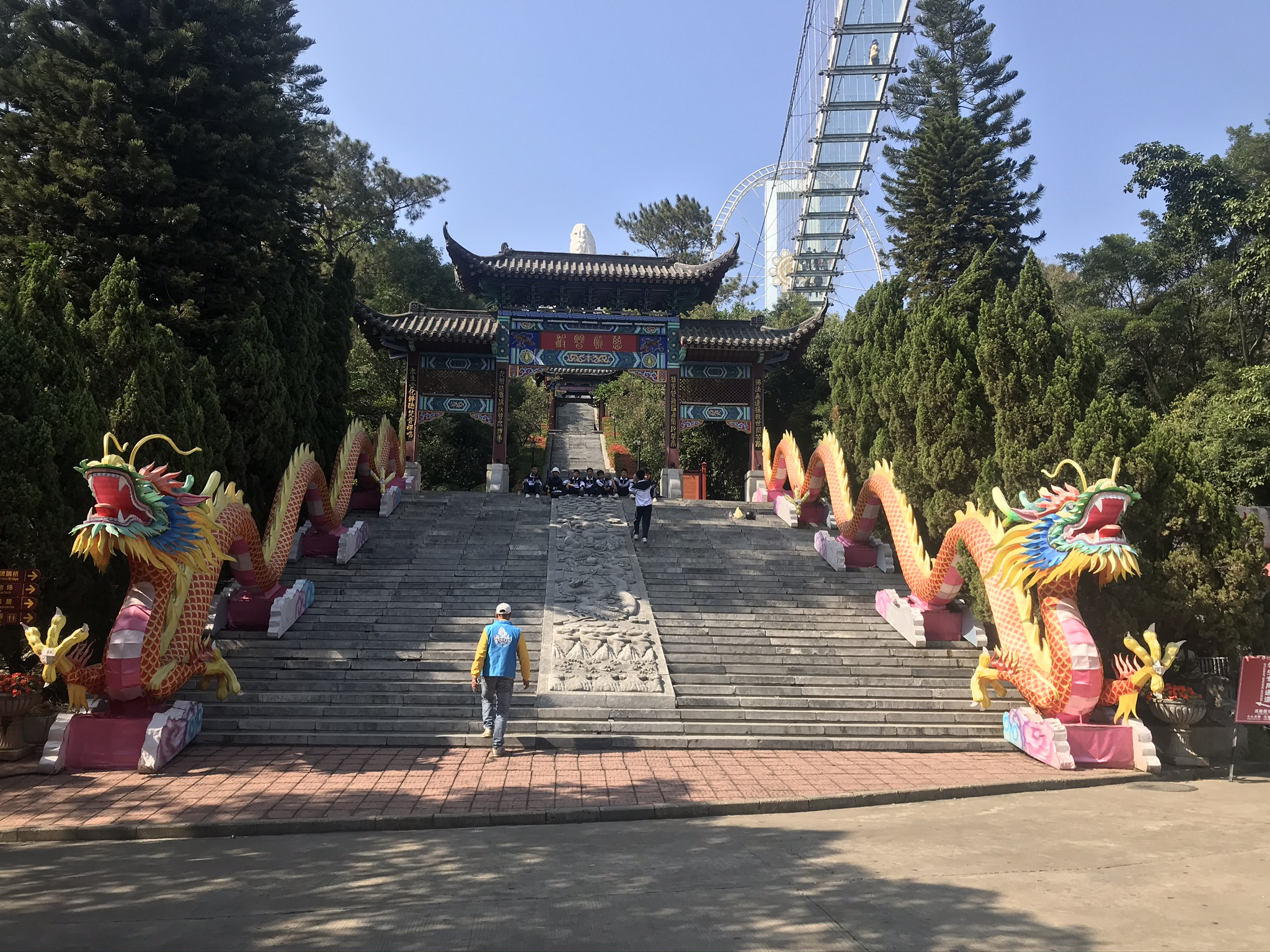
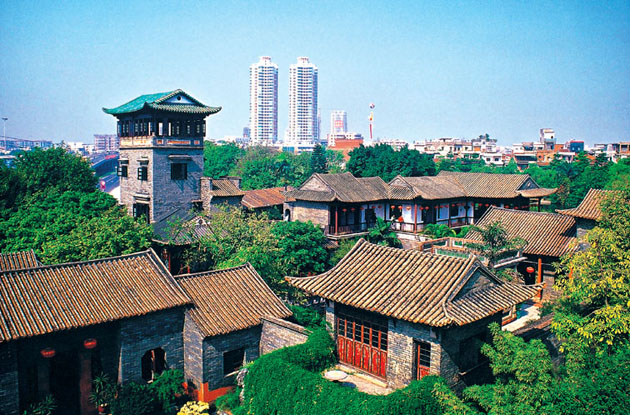
- Dongguan CBD Dongguan Avenue Humen Mountain Yinxian Mountain Resort Keyuan

- Location of Dongguan in Guangdong
- Interactive map of Dongguan
- Location of the city center in Guangdong Dongguan (China)
- Coordinates (Dongguan government): 23°01′16″N 113°45′07″E
- Country: China
- Province: Guangdong
- County: 331 AD
- City (County-level): September 1985
- City (Prefecture-level): 1 January 1988
- Municipal seat: Nancheng Subdistrict

Government
  - Type: Prefecture-level city
  - Body: Dongguan Municipal People's Congress
  - CCP Secretary: Liang Weidong
  - Congress Chairman: Liang Weidong
  - Mayor: Xiao Yafei
  - CPPCC Chairman: Luo Zhaoqun

Area
  - Prefecture-level city: 2,465 km^{2} (952 sq mi)
  - Urban: 2,465 km^{2} (952 sq mi)
  - Metro: 19,870.4 km^{2} (7,672.0 sq mi)
- Elevation: 8 m (26 ft)

Population (2024 census)
  - Prefecture-level city: 10,570,800
  - Rank: 3rd in Guangdong; 8th in China
  - Density: 4,288/km^{2} (11,110/sq mi)
  - Urban: 10,570,800
  - Urban density: 4,288/km^{2} (11,110/sq mi)
  - Metro: 65,655,622
  - Metro density: 3,304.19/km^{2} (8,557.82/sq mi)

GDP
  - Prefecture-level city: CN¥ 1.228 trillion US$ 168.3 billion
  - Per capita: CN¥ 103,284; US$ 16,010
- Time zone: UTC+8 (China Standard Time)
- Postal code: 523000
- Area code: 769
- ISO 3166 code: CN-GD-19
- Licence plate prefixes: 粤S
- City flower: Yulan magnolia Magnolia denudata
- Website: www.dg.gov.cn

Dongguan
- "Dongguan" in Simplified (top) and Traditional (bottom) Chinese characters
- Simplified Chinese: 东莞
- Traditional Chinese: 東莞
- Hanyu Pinyin: Dōngguǎn
- Cantonese Yale: Dùnggún or Dūnggún
- Postal: Tungkun
- Literal meaning: "Eastern Bulrush(es)"
Transcriptions
Standard Mandarin
- Hanyu Pinyin: Dōngguǎn
- Bopomofo: ㄉㄨㄥ ㄍㄨㄢˇ
- Gwoyeu Romatzyh: Donggoan
- Wade–Giles: Tung^{1}-kuan^{3}
- Tongyong Pinyin: Dongguǎn
- Yale Romanization: Dūnggwǎn
- MPS2: Dūngguǎn
- IPA: [tʊ́ŋ.kwàn]
Wu
- Wugniu: ton^{1} kuoe^{3}
- IPA: Shanghainese: [toŋ˥ kuø˧]
Hakka
- Romanization: Dung^{1}gon^{3} or Tûng-kón
Yue: Cantonese
- Yale Romanization: Dùnggún or Dūnggún
- Jyutping: Dung1gun2
- IPA: [tôŋ.kǔːn] or [tóŋ.kǔːn]

Dongguan (Note: /dʊŋˈɡwæn/; Chinese: 东莞市; pinyin: Dōngguǎn Shì; alternately romanized via Cantonese as Tungkun) is a prefecture-level city in central Guangdong Province, China. An important industrial city in the Pearl River Delta, Dongguan borders the provincial capital of Guangzhou to the north, Huizhou to the northeast, Shenzhen to the south, and the Pearl River to the west. It is part of the Pearl River Delta built-up (or metro) area with more than 65.57 million inhabitants as of the 2020 census spread over nine municipalities across an area of 19,870 square kilometers (7,670 sq mi).

Dongguan's city administration is considered especially progressive in seeking foreign direct investment. Dongguan ranks behind only Shenzhen, Shanghai and Suzhou in exports among Chinese cities, with $65.54 billion in shipments. It is also home to one of the world's largest shopping malls, the New South China Mall, which is seeing increased activity. The city is geographically and thus culturally Cantonese in the Weitou form as well as culturally Hakka in the prefectures of Fenggang and Qingxi; the majority of the 21st century population speaks Mandarin due to the large influx of economic migrants from other parts of China. The city is home to several universities, including Guangdong University of Science and Technology, Guangdong Medical University and Dongguan University of Technology.

== Economy ==
In the Pearl River Delta region, Dongguan was the first urban area where joint production was implemented between village collectives, local Chinese Communist Party cadres, and foreign investors. In the 1990s, that type of enterprise accounted for around 20 percent of all foreign direct investments, and approximately 50 percent of exports by the People's Republic of China (PRC).

Today Dongguan is a major manufacturing hub, although it suffered significant loss of economic activity from the impact of the 2008 financial crisis. The largest industrial sector is manufacturing of electronics and communications equipment; international companies with facilities in Dongguan include DuPont, Samsung Electronics, Nokia, Coca-Cola, Nestlé and Maersk. It is also a strong hub of toy making, with 4,000 toy-production enterprises, and near to 1,500 related factories.

The Dongguan Science and Technology Museum opened in December 2005 and is the high tech commerce park in the Songshan Lake district, which opened in 2003. The museum is a partnership with the Global IT Academy of the Brea Olinda Unified School District in Southern California, demonstrating the city's emphasis on attracting technology business. The city announced in 2005 a planned investment of US$500 million over five years for technology infrastructure improvements. The city administration is considered especially progressive in seeking foreign direct investment. Among the investors were Brazilian shoe manufacturers. Brazil excelled in manufacturing cheap footwear in the 1970s and 80s. The Brazilian community in Dongguan numbered 4,000 people in 2013.

While the city is the fourth largest export region in China, behind Shanghai, Shenzhen, and Suzhou, Dongguan has yet to gain the kind of name recognition outside of China as has been realized by Shenzhen. That may be because the city has focused on infrastructure investment rather than the direct targeting of major corporations with financial incentives for economic development. Nevertheless, Dongguan has been identified by high-level representatives of the National Development and Reform Commission of the central government as one of the most significant growth regions for technology. As part of that plan, the Dongguan local government announced its intention to create and support a 100-billion-yuan photovoltaic manufacturing industry by 2015.

To cope with the impact of the 2008 financial crisis, Dongguan city looked to industrial restructuring, focusing on four pillar platforms, namely governmental services, supporting measures, technology upgrade, and market expansion. The city government claimed that the process has enhanced its capability for independent innovation and the quantity of patent applications.

Dongguan was known as China's "Sin City", where prostitution thrived, but authorities have attempted to eradicate that aspect of the city. On 9 February 2014, China Central Television aired a special on the sex industry in Dongguan. On the same day, Guangdong Provincial Police raided and closed all saunas, bars, foot massage premises, karaoke bars, and other businesses associated with the sex industry. The negative economic impact of the crackdown was reported to be 50 billion yuan, or just over $8 billion US dollars. The campaign affected the livelihoods of taxi drivers and restaurants which, while not directly involved in the sex industry, benefited from the increase in clientele.

The city ranked 13th by Forbes China in its list of the most innovative mainland cities, as well as 18th in Foreign Policy's listing of the most dynamic cities in the world.

== History ==
The earliest traces of human habitation in the area stretch back 5,000 years. In 1839, at the outset of the First Opium War, large quantities of seized opium were destroyed in Humen, a town that now belongs to Dongguan. Several of the major battles of the war were fought in this area.

During the Second World War, the city served as the base for guerrilla resistance against the occupation that came with the Second Sino-Japanese War.

Being a district of the Huiyang prefecture before, as its economy overshadowed the prefectural capital of Huizhou itself, Dongguan earned city status in 1985, and was upgraded to prefecture city status three years later. During this period the city changed its focus from an agricultural town into a manufacturing hub, with an average annual growth of up to 18 percent.

== Geography ==
Geographically, the city is mostly hilly to the east and flat in the west, with 115.98 kilometers (72.07 mi) of shoreline. The urban center of Dongguan is 50 kilometers (31 mi) from that of Guangzhou to its north, 90 kilometers (56 mi) from Shenzhen to its south, 47 nautical miles (87 km) from Hong Kong and 48 nautical miles (89 km) from Macau by waterway. It is positioned in the middle of the Guangzhou-Shenzhen economic corridor, a hub for both land and sea transport.

Of Dongguan's total area, 27 percent is water, 25 percent forest land, and 13 percent arable land, while 35 percent of its land area has been fully developed.

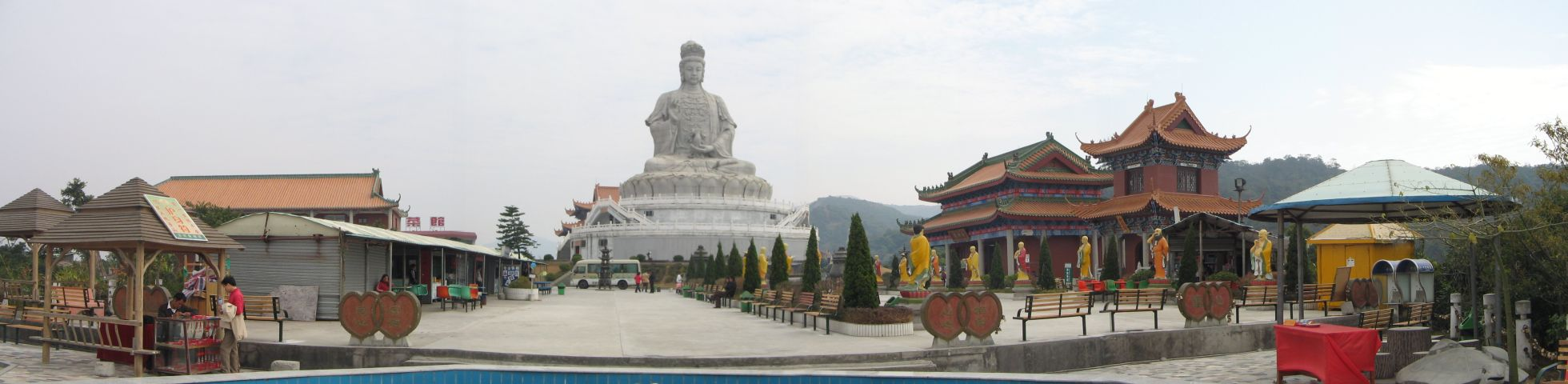
Guan Yin Shan (Kuan Yin Mountain) in Dongguan

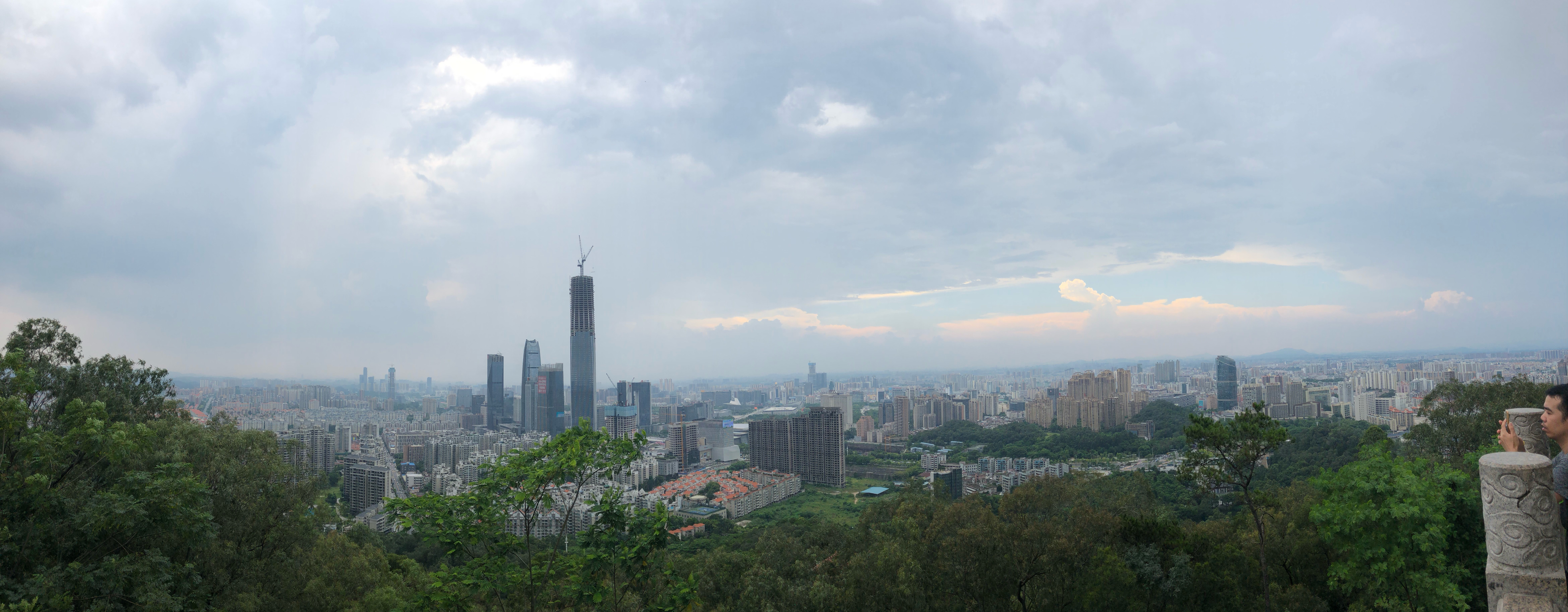
Skyscrapers in Dongguan

=== Climate ===
Dongguan has a dry-winter humid subtropical climate (Köppen climate classification: Cwa), with abundant rainfall over the year. It lies just south of the Tropic of Cancer. The average temperature is 22.9 °C (73.2 °F) throughout the year with average rainfall of 1,893 millimeters (74.5 in). With monthly percent possible sunshine ranging from 23 percent in March to 57 percent in October, the city receives 1892 hours of bright sunshine annually.

Climate data for Dongguan, elevation 56 m (184 ft), (1991–2020 normals, extremes 1951–present)
Month	Jan	Feb	Mar	Apr	May	Jun	Jul	Aug	Sep	Oct	Nov	Dec	Year
Record high °C (°F)	28.4 (83.1)	29.9 (85.8)	32.7 (90.9)	34 (93)	36.7 (98.1)	38.0 (100.4)	38.9 (102.0)	37.9 (100.2)	37.9 (100.2)	35.9 (96.6)	33.6 (92.5)	30.0 (86.0)	38.9 (102.0)
Mean daily maximum °C (°F)	19.1 (66.4)	20.4 (68.7)	22.9 (73.2)	26.6 (79.9)	30.0 (86.0)	31.7 (89.1)	32.9 (91.2)	32.9 (91.2)	31.9 (89.4)	29.3 (84.7)	25.4 (77.7)	20.8 (69.4)	27.0 (80.6)
Daily mean °C (°F)	14.8 (58.6)	16.3 (61.3)	19 (66)	22.8 (73.0)	26.1 (79.0)	28 (82)	28.8 (83.8)	28.7 (83.7)	27.8 (82.0)	25.2 (77.4)	21.1 (70.0)	16.4 (61.5)	22.9 (73.2)
Mean daily minimum °C (°F)	11.9 (53.4)	13.5 (56.3)	16.3 (61.3)	20.2 (68.4)	23.4 (74.1)	25.4 (77.7)	26.0 (78.8)	25.8 (78.4)	24.8 (76.6)	22.0 (71.6)	17.9 (64.2)	13.3 (55.9)	20.0 (68.1)
Record low °C (°F)	0.4 (32.7)	−0.5 (31.1)	3.0 (37.4)	8.2 (46.8)	15.3 (59.5)	18.3 (64.9)	20.6 (69.1)	21 (70)	14.8 (58.6)	8.0 (46.4)	4.5 (40.1)	0.9 (33.6)	−0.5 (31.1)
Average precipitation mm (inches)	46.6 (1.83)	51.1 (2.01)	90.3 (3.56)	194.8 (7.67)	295.9 (11.65)	375.8 (14.80)	232.8 (9.17)	293.7 (11.56)	184.5 (7.26)	55.3 (2.18)	36.1 (1.42)	36.5 (1.44)	1,893.4 (74.55)
Average precipitation days (≥ 0.1 mm)	6.9	9.7	12.7	14.4	16.0	18.7	17.4	17.6	12.8	5.7	5.1	5.7	142.7
Average relative humidity (%)	69	74	78	80	80	82	79	80	75	68	67	65	75
Mean monthly sunshine hours	134.5	99.9	87.1	106.6	149.3	169.7	218.0	192.4	188.5	203.1	178.8	164.0	1,891.9
Percentage possible sunshine	40	31	23	28	36	42	53	48	52	57	54	49	43
Source: China Meteorological Administration all-time extreme temperatureall-time October record

== Demographics ==
Dongguan had an estimated 6,949,800 inhabitants at the end of 2008, among whom 1,748,700 were local residents and 5,201,100 permanent migrants from other parts of the country. At the 2010 Census the population had expanded to 8,220,237. The number reached 10.5 million by 2020.

According to the Seventh National Census in 2020, the city's permanent population was 10,466,625. Compared with 8,220,237 people in the Sixth National Census in 2010, the city's permanent population increased by 2,246,388 people, an increase of 27.33%, with an average annual growth rate of 2.45%.

In addition, Dongguan is the hometown for many overseas Chinese.

== Administration ==
Dongguan is a prefecture-level city of the Guangdong province. An uncommon administrative feature is that it has no county-level division, but the municipal government does group the 32 township-level divisions into six district areas. The city government directly administers four Subdistricts and 28 towns:

Map
Name	Simplified Chinese	Hanyu Pinyin	Population (2010 census)	Area (km^{2})	Density (/km^{2})	Division code	Residential communities	Administrative villages
Chengqu Area	城区片区	Chéngqū Piànqū	1,653,407	299.0	5529.78	—	4 subdistricts, 2 towns	
Dongcheng Subdistrict	东城街道	Dōngchéng Jiēdào	492,875	110.0	4,480.68	441900003	23	
Nancheng Subdistrict	南城街道	Nánchéng Jiēdào	289,255	59.0	4,902.62	441900004	18	
Wanjiang Subdistrict	万江街道	Wànjiāng Jiēdào	244,765	50.5	4,846.83	441900005	28	
Guancheng Subdistrict	莞城街道	Guǎnchéng Jiēdào	162,116	13.5	12,008.59	441900006	8	
Shijie town	石碣镇	Shíjié Zhèn	246,960	36.0	6,860.00	441900101	1	14
Gaobu town	高埗镇	Gāobù Zhèn	217,436	30.0	7,247.86	441900129	1	18
Songshanhu Area	松山湖片区	Sōngshānhú Piànqū	1,467,455	433.8	3382.79	—	6 towns	
Shilong town	石龙镇	Shílóng Zhèn	141,850	11.3	12,553.09	441900102	3	7
Chashan town	茶山镇	Cháshān Zhèn	156,522	51.0	3,069.05	441900103	2	16
Shipai town	石排镇	Shípái Zhèn	160,202	56.0	2,860.75	441900104	1	18
Liaobu town	寮步镇	Liáobù Zhèn	418,578	87.5	4783.74	441900111	10	20
Dalang town	大朗镇	Dàlǎng Zhèn	310,889	118.0	2,634.65	441900113	12	16
Dalingshan town	大岭山镇	Dàlǐngshān Zhèn	279,414	110.0	2,540.12	441900118	3	21
Dongbu Area	东部片区	Dōngbù Piànqū	1,349,280	493.5	2734.10	—	7 towns	
Qishi town	企石镇	Qǐshí Zhèn	121,693	51.0	2,386.13	441900105	1	19
Hengli town	横沥镇	Hénglì Zhèn	204,830	50.0	4,096.60	441900106	1	16
Qiaotou town	桥头镇	Qiáotóu Zhèn	166,774	56.0	2,978.10	441900107	6	11
Xiegang town	谢岗镇	Xiègǎng Zhèn	99,387	103.0	964.92	441900108	1	11
Dongkeng town	东坑镇	Dōngkēng Zhèn	138,819	27.5	5,047.96	441900109	2	14
Changping town	常平镇	Chángpíng Zhèn	386,378	108.0	3,577.57	441900110	2	31
Huangjiang town	黄江镇	Huángjiāng Zhèn	231,399	98.0	2,361.21	441900114	7	
Dongnan Area	东南片区	Dōngnán Piànqū	1,246,493	472.3	2639.19	—	4 towns	
Zhangmutou town	樟木头镇	Zhāngmùtou Zhèn	132,816	118.8	1,117.97	441900112	10	
Qingxi town	清溪镇	Qīngxī Zhèn	312,639	143.0	2,186.28	441900115	1	20
Tangxia town	塘厦镇	Tángxià Zhèn	482,067	128.0	3,766.14	441900116	23	
Fenggang town	凤岗镇	Fènggǎng Zhèn	318,971	82.5	3,866.31	441900117	1	11
Binhai Area	滨海片区	Bīnhǎi Piànqū	1,918,652	509.3	3767.23	—	4 towns	
Chang'an town	长安镇	Cháng'ān Zhèn	664,230	97.8	6,791.71	441900119	13	
Humen town	虎门镇	Hǔmén Zhèn	638,657	178.5	3,577.91	441900121	31	
Houjie town	厚街镇	Hòujiē Zhèn	438,283	126.0	3,478.43	441900122	24	
Shatian town	沙田镇	Shātián Zhèn	177,482	107.0	1,658.71	441900123	2	16
Shuixiang Area	水乡片区	Shuǐxiāng Piànqū	543,632	261.5	2078.89	—	5 towns	
Daojiao town	道滘镇	Dàojiào Zhèn	143,107	63.0	2,271.53	441900124	1	13
Hongmei town	洪梅镇	Hóngméi Zhèn	58,114	33.0	1,761.03	441900125	1	9
Machong town	麻涌镇	Máchǒng Zhèn	118,062	74.0	1,595.43	441900126	2	13
Wangniudun town	望牛墩镇	Wàngniúdūn Zhèn	84,786	31.5	2,685.65	441900127	1	21
Zhongtang town	中堂镇	Zhōngtáng Zhèn	139,563	60.0	2,326.05	441900128	5	15
Special Jurisdictions						441900400	3	

Administrative divisions of Dongguan
Division code	English name	Chinese	Pinyin	Area in km^{2}	Population 2010	Seat	Postal code	Divisions			
Division code	English name	Chinese	Pinyin	Area in km^{2}	Population 2010	Seat	Postal code	Subdistricts	Towns	Residential communities	Administrative villages
441900	Dongguan City	东莞市	Dōngguǎn Shì	2,465.00	8,220,207	City-administered District	523000	4	28	248	350
441900	City-administered District	市辖区	Shìxiáqū	2,465.00	8,220,207	Nancheng Subdistrict	523000	4	28	248	350

== Transport ==
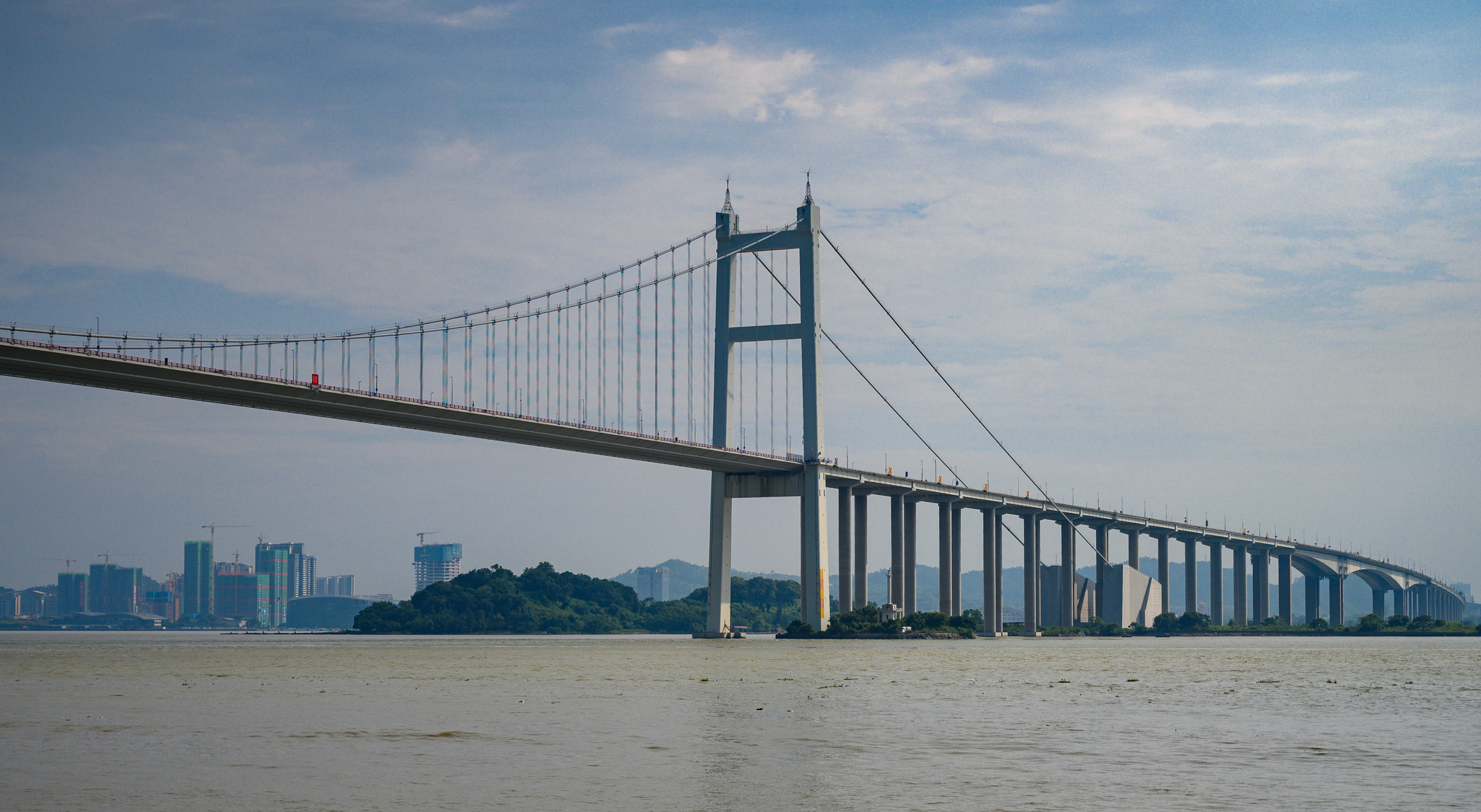
Humen Pearl River Bridge

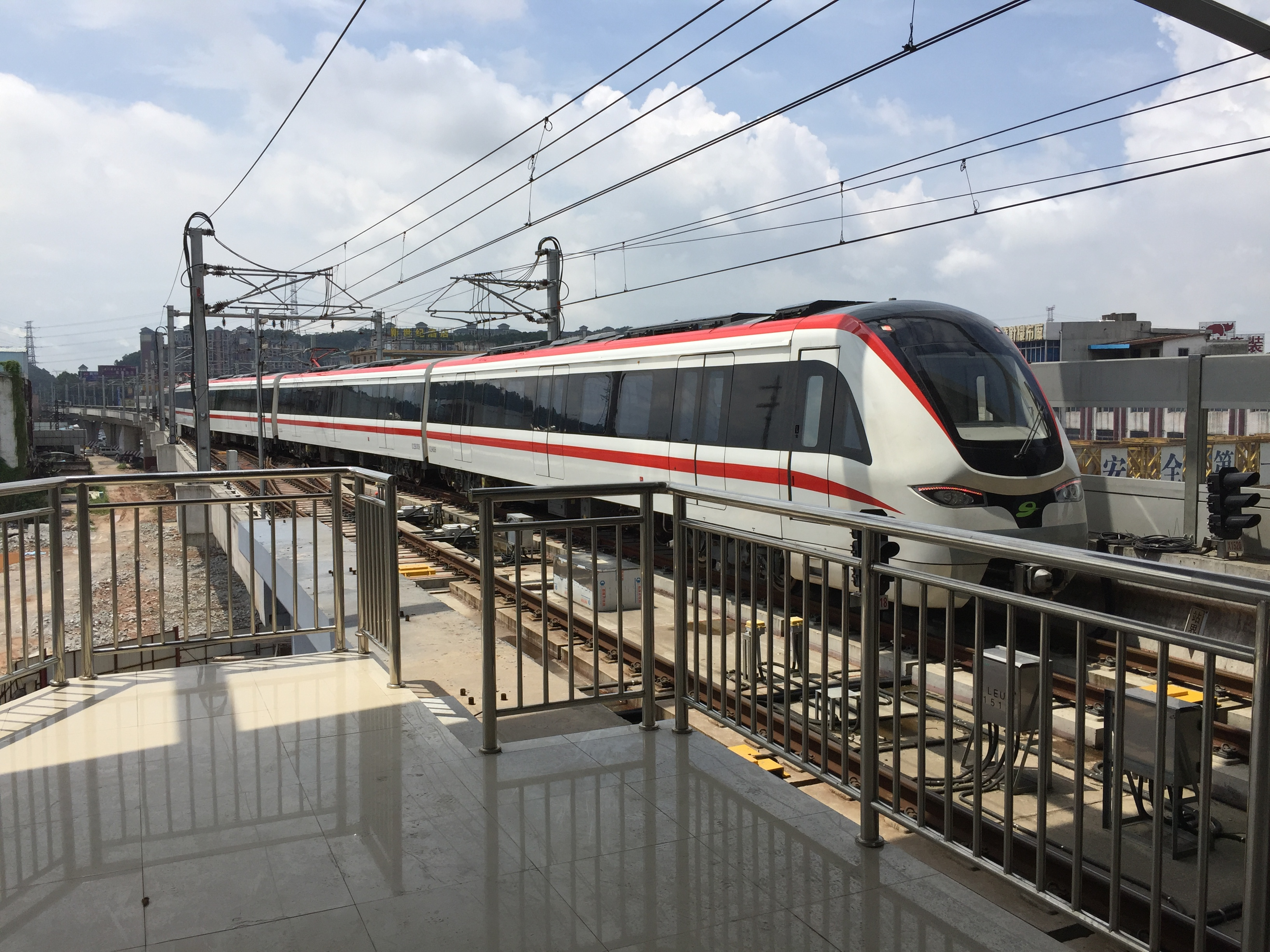
Dongguan Rail Transit Line 2

=== Air ===
Dongguan is served by Guangzhou Baiyun International Airport, Shenzhen Bao'an International Airport, but primarily by Hong Kong International Airport; ticketed passengers to HKIA can take ferries from the Humen Ferry Terminal in Humen to the HKIA Skypier. There are also coach bus services connecting Dongguan with HKIA.

=== Road ===
Many foreign travellers to Dongguan fly into Hong Kong, which gives visas on arrival to citizens of over 170 countries. One can travel from Hong Kong to Dongguan by bus, ferry, or train. Passengers travelling overland must disembark from their transport at the Hong Kong/China border to go through customs and immigration, except for those travelling on the Mass Transit Railway intercity services (former Kowloon–Canton Railway) from Hung Hom station to Dongguan, Guangzhou and beyond.

People can also choose to drive between Hong Kong and Dongguan. With the permitted business license plate and driver license, people can drive through the customs located at Shenzhen so that to get to Hong Kong. The drive normally takes about three hours. In 2018, G4 Expressway (Beijing–Hong Kong–Macau Expressway) was opened, and Dongguan is one of the cities that G4 Expressway approaches. This benefits people from Dongguan to travel to those cities on G4 Expressway.

The Humen Pearl River Bridge is a suspension bridge over the Pearl River. Completed in 1997, it has a main span of 888 meters (2,913 ft). The second Humen Pearl River Bridge (Nansha Bridge) opened in 2019.

=== Rail ===
Dongguan serves as one of the regional railway hubs in Guangdong, where the Guangzhou–Kowloon railway, Guangzhou–Meizhou–Shantou railway and the Beijing–Kowloon railway converge. Rail services in and out of the city call at Dongguan railway station where there are direct train services to Guangzhou East railway station in Guangzhou; and Hung Hom railway station in Hong Kong. High-speed rail services are also available at Humen railway station.

Dongguan is a major domestic hub in the China-Europe railway, which is developed through the Belt and Road Initiative.

=== Metro ===
Among the four metro lines (Line 1-Line 4) planned for the Dongguan Rail Transit, Line 2 was scheduled to open for operations in early 2015. This was delayed and opened in May 2016. Line 2 will link towns in Western Dongguan, thereby promoting the connection of the entire downtown area with Houjie, Humen and Chang'an. It will also support Dongguan's regional transportation with other cities such as Guangzhou, Shenzhen, Hong Kong by joining with the rail transit junctions of the Pearl River Delta.

Line 1, the only other operational line, opened on 28 November 2025.

== Sports and culture ==
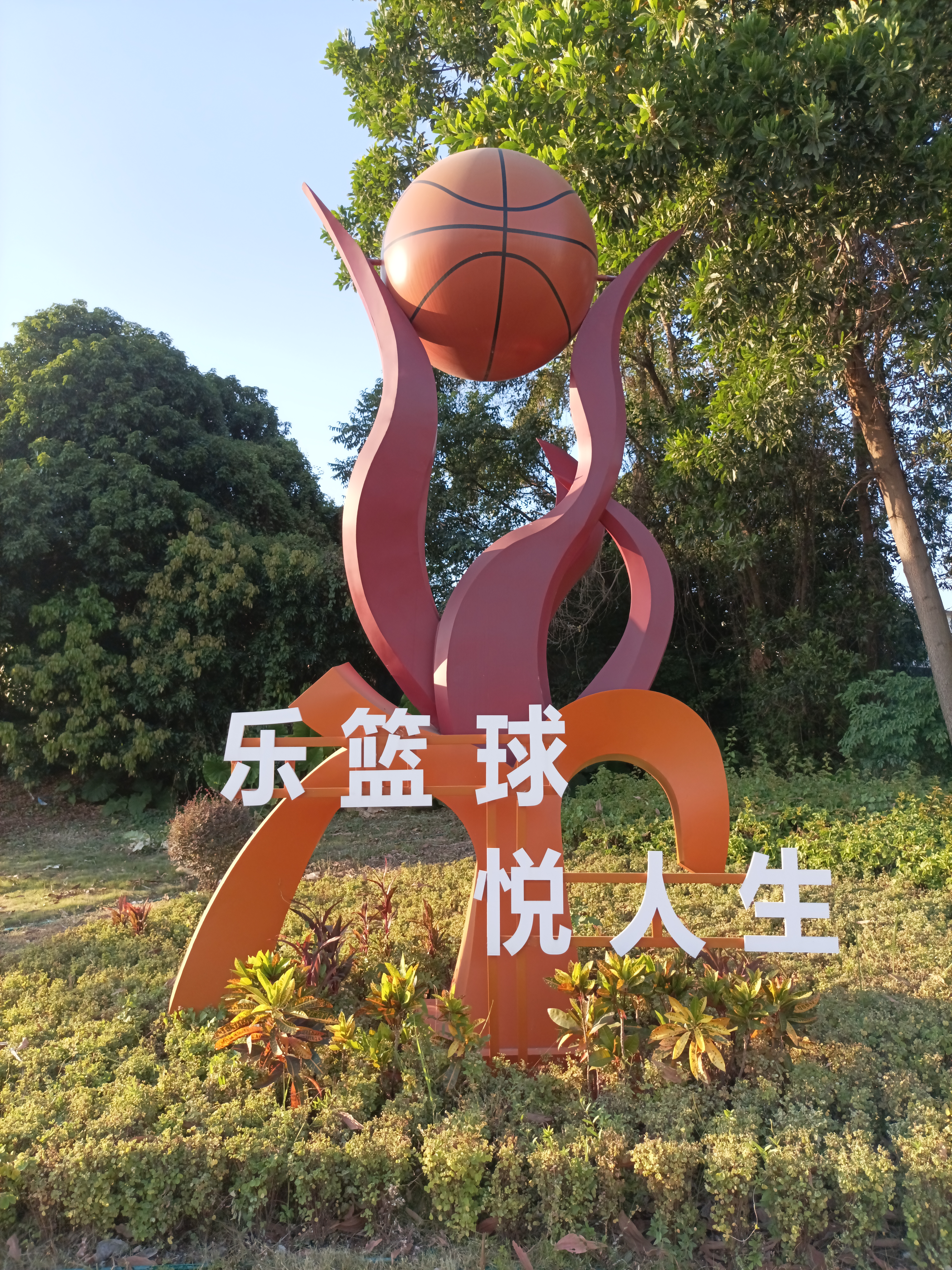
Basketball street art in Dongguan

Established in 1993, the Guangdong Southern Tigers are a professional basketball club.

The city hosted Weightlifting events during the 2010 Asian Games at the Dongguan Arena.

The 16,000 seat Dongguan Basketball Center was one of the venues for the 2019 FIBA Basketball World Cup. The venue has also hosted the 2015 Sudirman Cup badminton tournament.

Dongguan Yulan Theater is a multipurpose performing arts venue which houses two theaters.

== Social issues ==
The city and province have been the recent focus of press and journalist attention with coverage of the many young Chinese workers, principally females (so-called factory girls), from agricultural areas who work in the area's factories and manufacturing/assembly facilities, where many are housed in large dormitories, usually several to a room.

An article in the High Tech Misery in China series reports research conducted, over 2008 to 2009, on working conditions at one of the city's major keyboard makers (Dongguan Meitai Plastics & Electronics Factory); in it, Meitai factory won some unwanted attention due to the poor conditions for its young, mostly female workers. The article includes details of those conditions, photos, translations of employer's rules and evidence that well-known computer brands use this keyboard supplier's products.

=== Capital of Sex ===
Also, Dongguan has built a notoriety within China for its various types of brothels, massage parlors, nightclubs, sauna centers and karaoke bars. The city had more than 120 top-end luxury hotels and hundreds of other mid-range places that offer illegal sexual services or lease floors to sex operators, and many parts of the broader service sector benefit from the trade brought by visitors. Although much of the business is illegal, police operations to limit these activities were for a long time largely ineffective, in part because corrupt members of the local administration and other officials have business interests in the sector. As a result, Dongguan was notorious as China's Capital of Sex (性都, also translated as Sex Capital of China or China's Sin City), its prostitution industry operating openly for decades alongside the city's rapid industrialization.

Dongguan's sex industry is known for its Dongguan Style Service (莞式服務, also translated as Dongguan Standard,) which refers to a highly standardized, ISO-like and regulated commercial sex service system that developed during the booming period of Dongguan's manufacturing industry. Its characteristics include standardized procedures, specific steps, and strict performance requirements.

However, on 9 February 2014, CCTV aired a report about prostitution in Dongguan. In reaction, on the same day, Dongguan police launched the 2014 crackdown on brothels, massage parlors, nightclubs, sauna centres and karaoke bars, leading to some commentary that the city's days as China's sex capital were numbered.

== See also ==
- 2014 crackdown on prostitution in Dongguan
- List of twin towns and sister cities in China
- Lanwa FC — former football club
- A Touch of Sin — a film that is partly set in Dongguan
- New first-tier city
