= Chengqu Area, Dongguan =

Chengqu
- Designated area
- 城区片区
- Country: People's Republic of China
- Province: Guangdong
- Prefecture-level city: Dongguan
- Time zone: UTC+8 (China Standard)

Chengqu (lit. downtown) is a designated area for city planning of Dongguan, Guangdong province, China.
