= Shuixiang Xincheng Area =

Shuixiang Xincheng
- Designated area
- 水乡新城
- Country: People's Republic of China
- Province: Guangdong
- Prefecture-level city: Dongguan
- Time zone: UTC+8 (China Standard)

Shuixiang Xincheng (lit. Water Town New City) is a designated area for city planning of Dongguan, Guangdong province, China.
