= Yangxi County =

Yangxi 阳西县
- County
- Location of the seat in Guangdong
- Coordinates: 21°45′07″N 111°37′05″E
- Country: People's Republic of China
- Province: Guangdong
- Prefecture-level city: Yangjiang

Area
  - Total: 1,271 km^{2} (491 sq mi)
- Time zone: UTC+8 (China Standard)

Yangxi County (simplified Chinese: 阳西县; traditional Chinese: 陽西縣; pinyin: Yángxī Xiàn) is a coastal county in the southwest of Guangdong Province, China, facing the South China Sea to the south. It is under the administration of the prefecture-level city of Yangjiang. The county has a total area of 1,271 km^{2} (491 sq mi), and 126.6 km (78.7 mi) of coastline.

Yangjiang administrative divisions (French)

== Administrative divisions ==
Yangxi County was established in 1988 and there are 8 towns and 1 township. In 1993, Pu Township was named into Pu town. In August 2003, Pu town was incorporated into Zhilong town, Yangxi county governs Zhilong town (织篢镇), Chengcun town (程村镇), Shapa town (沙扒镇), Xinxu town (新圩镇) and Rudong town (儒洞镇), Tangkou town (塘口镇), Xitou town (溪头镇) and Shangyang town (上洋镇) totally eight towns. The County People's government locates in Zhilong town.

Zhilong town is the home of Yangxi county, become the political, economic and cultural center of Yangxi county. The town is a subtropical monsoon climate, sunshine, abundant rainfall, with mountains and seas and also is optimal.

== Economy ==
Primary Industry

Yangxi County is rich in rice, litchi, longan, watermelon, pepper and so on, which YuHeBao litchi, Shangyang town watermelon, Pupai town pepper, Xitou town colorful potatoes and Rudong town agricultural commodities are exported to all over the country. The county built in fruits, vegetables, medicinal herbs and Marine aquaculture, animal husbandry production and so on ten big production bases.

Secondary Industry

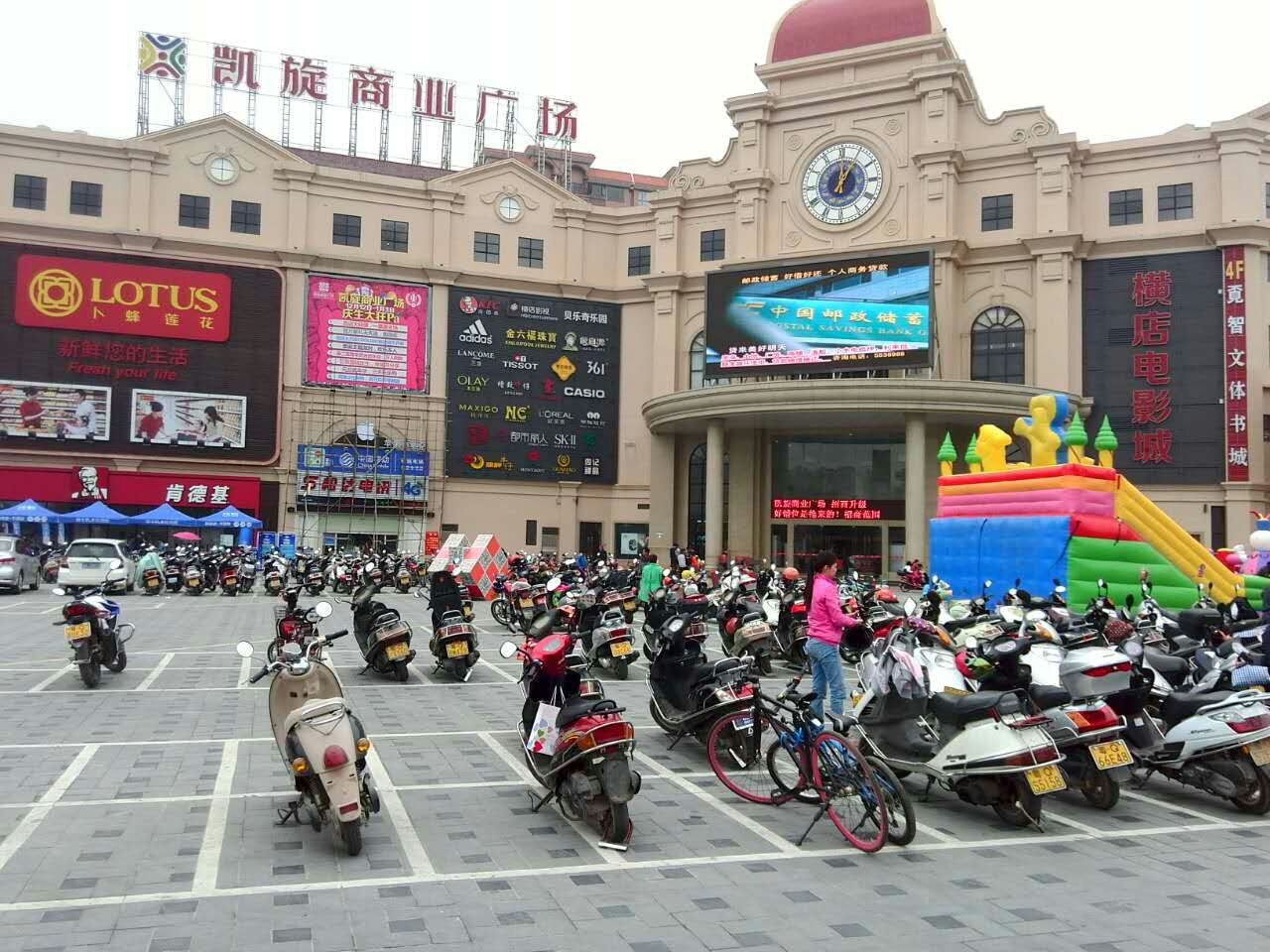
triumphant commercial plaza in Yangxi County（凯旋商业广场）

The local Zhongshan torch industrial park garden construction basically completes the Secord 3000 hectares of land development plan. Zhongshan torch industrial park was named provincial excellent park again. Marine industry basic District completed more than 300 hectares of land level. New building materials industrial park has new requisition of land of 2000 hectares. Wind power project is put into production.

Tertiary Industry

Yangxi has been holding the God Water Day on July 7 and Chongyang Festival Tourism and Cultural Activities County in these years. Many hotels such as the Yujing hot spring hotel and the Jiuzhou National hotel were built for the opening. Royal lagoon, triumphant luxurious, ZhongYang street real estate development completed investment of 800 million Yuan.

== Tourist ==
Salt Mineral Hot Springs (咸水矿温泉)

Salt Mineral Hot Springs is located on the center of the county, inside the Donghu Park. Inside the park, there are many facilities for entertainment, like merry-go-round and toy shot. Then in the center of hot springs, there are many pools in different healthy effects for people to enjoy themselves. Year and year, many people would like to come here for vocation even people outside the province.

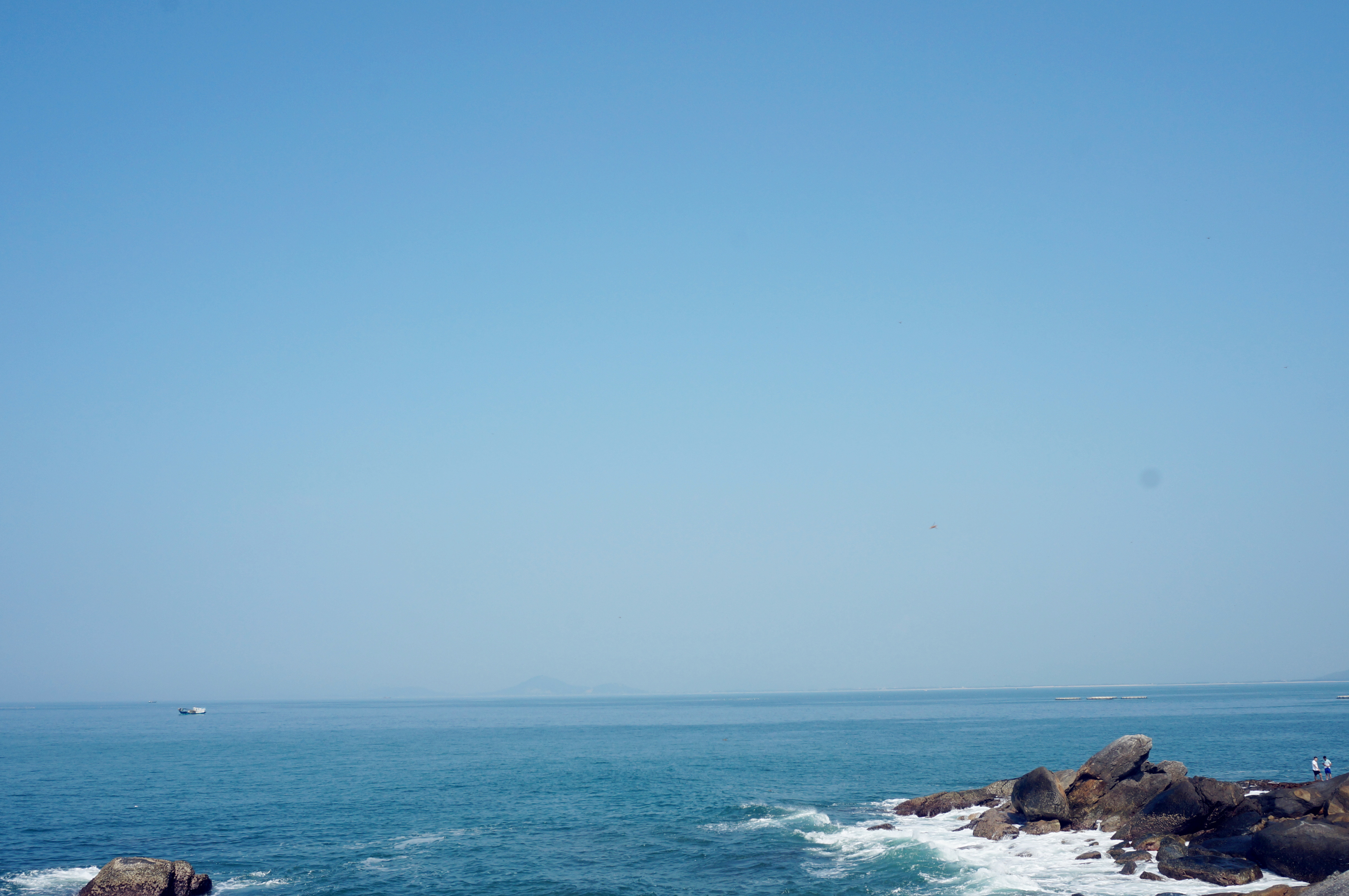
Shapa beach in Yangxi County (沙扒湾)

Shapa Beach (沙扒湾)

Shapa is a name of a town. The beach is known as the Moon Beach for its crescent-moon shape. It is a popular destination for fishing. It is well-known in the province for dried shredded squid and dried nori.

Dongshui Mountain (东水山)

Dongshui Mountain is special in its paper making technology, which does not mean its paper making technology is advanced but original. Local people try to make the bamboo into fragment by their hands or the hand working machine. Then people would make paper one by one.

== Custom and Humanity ==
Fishermen's Marriage (渔家婚嫁)

Yangxi fishermen's marriage customs are slightly different from shore residents. There are many etiquette on the shore, but the fishermen's customs is relatively simple, filled with interest, stained with a heritage of ancient rob close. Fishermen's marriage parents would discuss with each other and buy something for each other. Then fishermen's female in advance, crying marriage married two or three days ago, was wanted to wash bath, packing her body refreshed and then began to fete relatives and friends in the home, the day the day of orientation. The groom is accompanied by a group of young men with a ship. The bride is also accompanied by a group of women who don't let the bridegroom close the ship. The two sides sing the Salty Water songs. Last, the bride's family was returned and the resettlement is in a barge. The guy around the bride and groom teasing the newlyweds until night respectively, then the bride and groom into the ship, which means they can accompany with each other for their whole life.

Dragon-boat Racing (赛龙舟)

Dragon-boat races are held in different towns in Yangxi County when the Dragon Boat Festival approaches. People stand along the rivers or run toward the racing boats to watch. Competitors build boats for racing, and the dragon is a common shape, sometimes with other decorations.

== Special local product ==
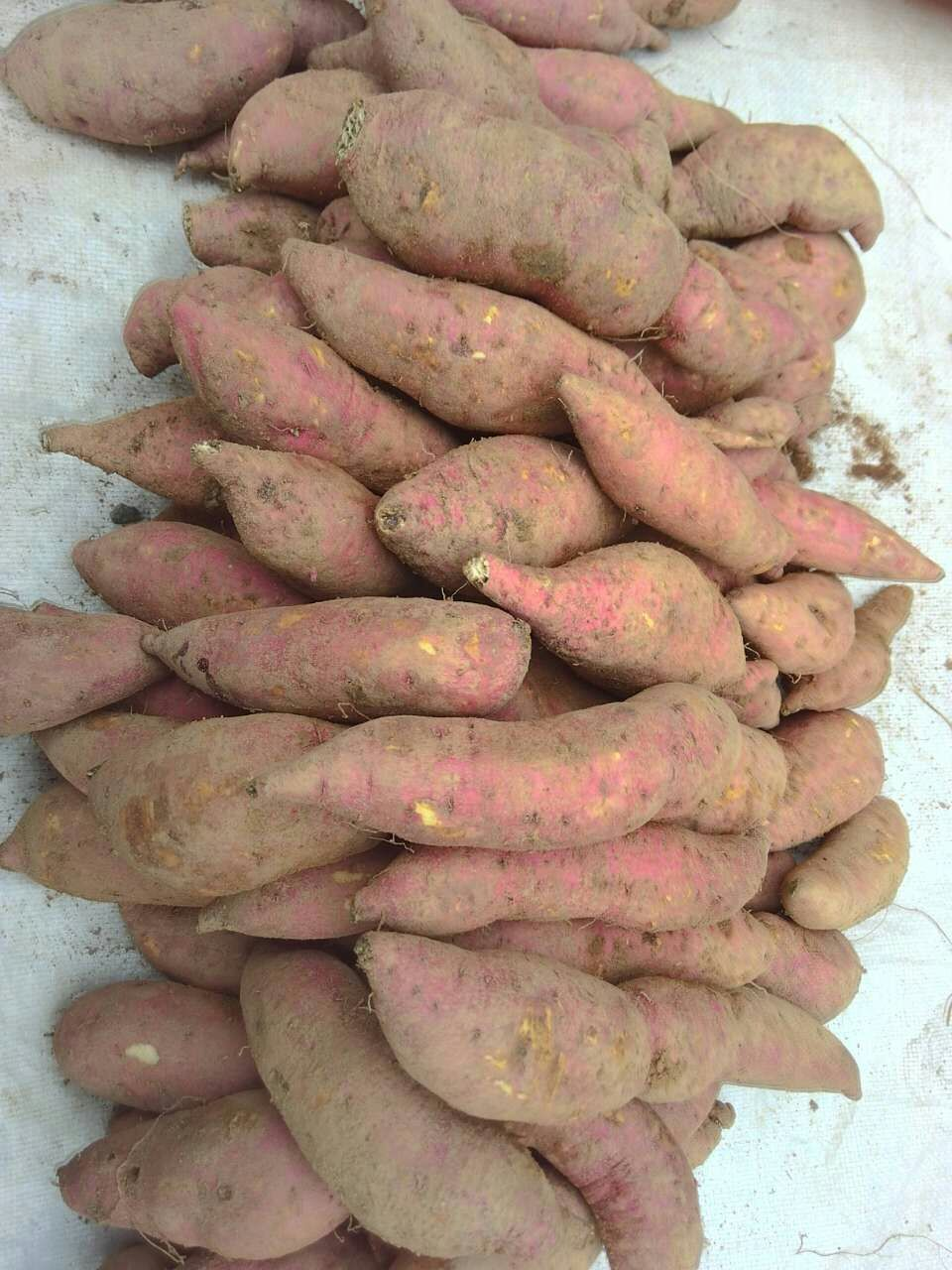
Colorful Potato (五彩薯)

Yu Hebao Litchi (玉荷包荔枝)

The history of Yu Hebao litchi in Yangxi County has been 300 years. The old trees with about 100 years are everywhere in Yangxi county and they are full of fruit. The leaves are small and pale green, narrow, apex slightly, but on both sides of the leaf margin roll-up, midrib concave. The shape of the fruit is round, slightly assumes the heart shape like the red skin.

Colorful Potato (五彩薯)

Colorful potato is famous for its various colors like red, yellow, white, purple and diverse colors. Local people like to eat it for breakfast or just for snack. People usually cook it for sweet soup. It is also healthy for the heart, the lung, the spleen and the liver.
