= Binhai Area, Dongguan =

Binhai
- Designated area
- 滨海片区
- Country: People's Republic of China
- Province: Guangdong
- Prefecture-level city: Dongguan
- Time zone: UTC+8 (China Standard)

Binhai (lit. near the sea) is a designated area for city planning of Dongguan, Guangdong province, China.
