= Pearl River Delta =

Megalopolis in South China

Coordinates: 22°32′N 113°44′E

Pearl River Delta 珠江三角洲 Delta do Rio das Pérolas
- Megalopolis
- Guangdong–Hong Kong–Macau; Greater Bay Area
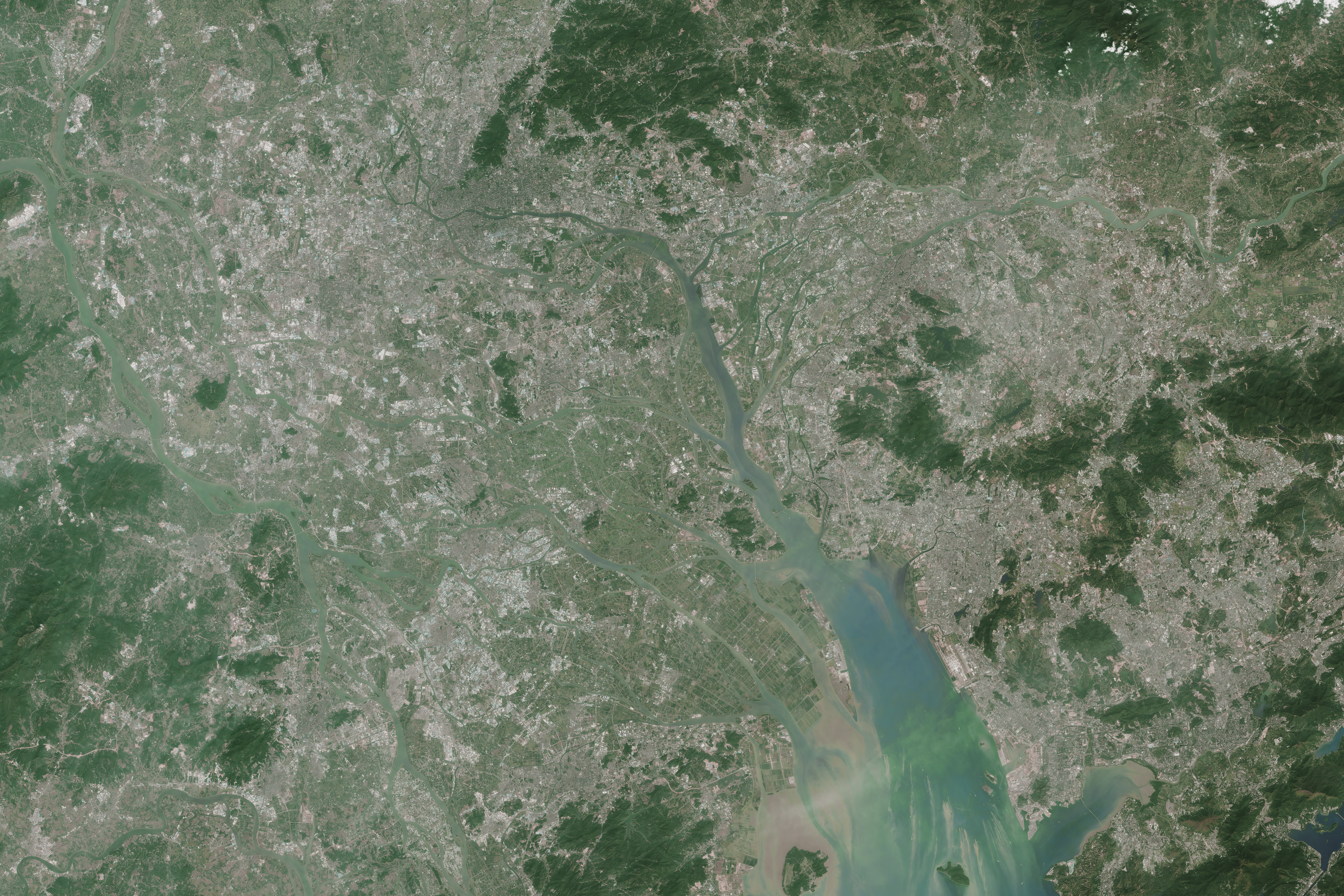
- 2014 satellite view of the Pearl River Delta from the NASA Earth Observatory

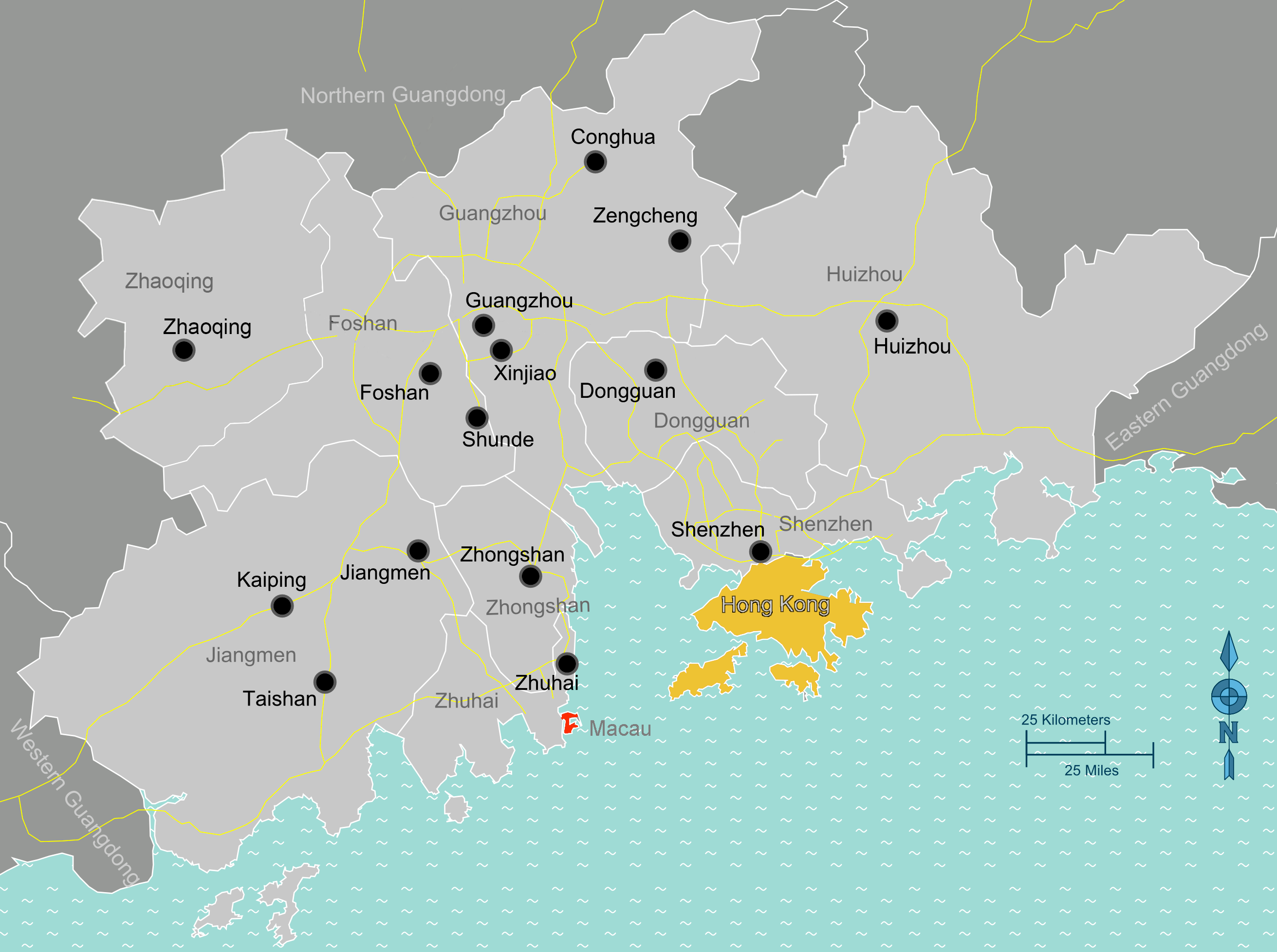
- Detailed map of the Guangdong-Hong Kong-Macau Greater Bay Area
- Interactive map of Pearl River Delta
- Provinces: Guangdong; Hong Kong; Macau
- Major Cities: Guangzhou; Shenzhen; Zhuhai; Foshan; Dongguan; Zhongshan; Jiangmen; Huizhou; Zhaoqing; Hong Kong; Macau

Government
  - Governor of Guangdong: Meng Fanli
  - Chief Executive of Hong Kong: John Lee
  - Chief Executive of Macau: Sam Hou Fai

Area
  - Total: 55,800 km^{2} (21,500 sq mi)

Population (2020)
  - Total: 86,100,000
  - Rank: 1st
  - Density: 1,540/km^{2} (4,000/sq mi)

Languages
- Cantonese and other varieties of Yue Chinese, Mandarin Chinese, English, Portuguese, Macanese Patois, and numerous other languages

GDP (nominal, 2024)
  - Total: CN¥14.8 trillion (US$2.1 trillion)
  - Per capita: CN¥170,900 (US$23,800)
- Time zone: UTC+8 (CST, HKT, MST)

Pearl River Delta

Chinese name
- Chinese: 珠江三角洲
Transcriptions
Standard Mandarin
- Hanyu Pinyin: Zhūjiāng Sānjiǎozhōu
Yue: Cantonese
- Yale Romanization: Jyūgōng Sāamgokjāu
- Jyutping: Zyu^{1}gong^{1} Saam^{1}gok^{3}zau^{1}
other Yue
- Taishanese: Zu˧˨ kong˥ Lam˧ guk˨˥ zou˧˨

Chinese abbreviation
- Chinese: 珠三角
- Literal meaning: Zhu (Pearl River) Delta
Transcriptions
Standard Mandarin
- Hanyu Pinyin: Zhūsānjiǎo
Yue: Cantonese
- Yale Romanization: Jyūsāamgok
- Jyutping: Zyu^{1}saam^{1}gok^{3}
other Yue
- Taishanese: Zu˧˨ lam˧ guk˨˥

Second alternative Chinese name
- Simplified Chinese: 粤江平原
- Traditional Chinese: 粵江平原
- Literal meaning: Yue (Guangdong) river plain
Transcriptions
Standard Mandarin
- Hanyu Pinyin: Yuèjiāng Píngyuán
Yue: Cantonese
- Jyutping: jyut^{6}gong^{1} ping^{4}jyun^{4}

Guangdong–Hong Kong–Macau Greater Bay Area
- Simplified Chinese: 粤港澳大湾区
- Traditional Chinese: 粵港澳大灣區
Transcriptions
Standard Mandarin
- Hanyu Pinyin: Yuègǎng'ào Dàwān Qū
Yue: Cantonese
- Jyutping: jyut^{6}gong^{2}ou^{3} daai^{6}waan^{1} keoi^{1}

Portuguese name
- Portuguese: Delta do Rio das Pérolas

The Pearl River Delta Metropolitan Region (Note: PRD; Chinese: 珠江三角洲城市圈; pinyin: Zhūjiāng Sānjiǎozhōu Chéngshìquān; Jyutping: Zyu^{1}gong^{1} Saam^{1}gok^{3}zau^{1} Sing^{4}si^{5}hyun^{1}; Portuguese: Delta do Rio das Pérolas (DRP)) is the low-lying area surrounding the Pearl River estuary, where the Pearl River flows into the South China Sea. Referred to as the Guangdong–Hong Kong–Macau Greater Bay Area in official documents, the region is one of the most densely populated and urbanized regions in the world, and is considered a megacity by numerous scholars. It is currently the wealthiest region in Southern China and one of the wealthiest regions in China along with the Yangtze River Delta in Eastern China and Jingjinji in Northern China. Most of the region is part of the Pearl River Delta Economic Zone, which is a special economic zone of China. The GBA's combined regional GDP was RMB¥15 trillion (US$2.1 trillion) in 2024, which was around equivalent to Spain.

The region is a megalopolis, and is at the southern end of a larger megalopolis running along the southern coast of China, which include metropolises such as Hong Kong, Shenzhen, Guangzhou, and Macau. The nine largest cities of the PRD had a combined population of 86 million in 2022; the PRD has become the largest urban area in the world in both size and population. The region's traditional language is Cantonese; in the late 20th century and the 21st century, due to the high inflow of migrant workers coming from other regions, Mandarin has gradually become a lingua franca.

The west side of this region, along with Chaoshan, was also the source of much Chinese emigration from the 19th to the mid-20th centuries, including to the Western world, where they formed many Chinatowns. Much of the Chinese diaspora in the US, Canada, Australia, Latin America, and much of Southeast Asia traces their ancestry to the west side of this region.

City	Area km^{2}	Population (2020)	GDP (LCU)	GDP (US$)
Shenzhen	1,986	17,560,000	CN¥ 3,680 billion	US$512.6 billion
Guangzhou	7,434	18,676,605	CN¥ 3,103 billion	US$432.2 billion
Hong Kong	1,114	7,413,070	HK$3,138 billion	US$401.8 billion
Foshan	3,848	9,498,863	CN¥ 1,336 billion	US$186.1 billion
Dongguan	2,465	10,466,625	CN¥ 1,228 billion	US$171.1 billion
Huizhou	10,922	6,042,852	CN¥ 614 billion	US$85.5 billion
Zhuhai	1,724	2,439,585	CN¥ 448 billion	US$62.4 billion
Zhongshan	1,784	4,418,060	CN¥ 414 billion	US$57.7 billion
Macau	115	672,800	MOP$430 billion	US$53.4 billion
Jiangmen	9,535	4,798,090	CN¥ 421 billion	US$58.2 billion
Zhaoqing	14,891	4,113,594	CN¥ 292 billion	US$40.7 billion
Guangdong–Hong Kong–Macau; Greater Bay Area	55,818	86,100,000	CN¥ 14.816 trillion	US$2.062 trillion

== Geography ==
The river delta, also known as the Golden Delta of Guangdong, is formed by three major rivers, the Xi Jiang (West River), Bei Jiang (North River), and Dong Jiang (East River). The flat lands of the delta are criss-crossed by a network of tributaries and distributaries of the Pearl River. The Pearl River Delta is actually two alluvial deltas, separated by the core branch of the Pearl River. The Bei Jiang and Xi Jiang converge to flow into the South China Sea and Pearl River in the west, while the Dong Jiang only flows into the Pearl River proper in the east.

The Xi Jiang begins exhibiting delta-like characteristics as far west as Zhaoqing, although this city is not usually considered a part of the PRD region. After passing through the Lingyang Gorge and converging with the Bei Jiang, the Xi Jiang opens up and flows as far east as Nansha District and as far west as Xinhui. Major distributaries of the Xi include Donghui Shuidao, Jiya Shuidao, Hutiaomen Shuidao, Yinzhou Hu, and the main branch of the Xi Jiang. Jiangmen and Zhongshan are the major cities found in the western section of the delta.

The Bei Jiang enters the delta plains at Qingyuan but does not begin to split until near Sanshui. From here the two main distributaries are Tanzhou Shuidao and Shunde Shuidao which form multiple mouths along the west side of the Pearl River's estuary. Two other distributaries, Lubao Cong and Xinan Cong, split from the Bei further north and converge with the Liuxi He to form the main branch of the Pearl River just north of Guangzhou. The other major city in the north section of the delta is Foshan.

The Dong Jiang flows through Huizhou into the delta. It begins diverging northeast of Dongguan into many distributaries, including the Dongguan Shuidao. Distributaries enter the Pearl River as far north as Luogang and as far south as Hu Men (Tiger Gate).

Saltwater crocodiles were present within the Pearl River estuary during antiquity.

== Location and demographics ==
As well as the delta itself, the term Pearl River Delta refers to the dense network of cities that covers nine prefectures of the province of Guangdong, namely Dongguan, Foshan, Guangzhou, Huizhou, Jiangmen, Shenzhen, Zhaoqing, Zhongshan and Zhuhai and the SARs of Hong Kong and Macau. The 2010/2011 State of the World Cities report, published by the United Nations Human Settlements Programme, estimates the population of the delta region at 120 million people; it is rapidly urbanising.

The eastern side of the PRD (Shenzhen, Dongguan), dominated by foreign capital, is the most developed economically. The western areas (Foshan, Zhuhai, Zhongshan, Jiangmen), dominated by local private capital, are open for development. New transport links between Hong Kong, Macau and Zhuhai in the PRD are expected to open up new areas for development, further integrate the cities, and facilitate trade within the region. The Hong Kong–Zhuhai–Macau Bridge, and the Shenzhen–Zhongshan Bridge, are amongst the longest bridges in the world with a total length of approximately 50 km (31 mi) each.

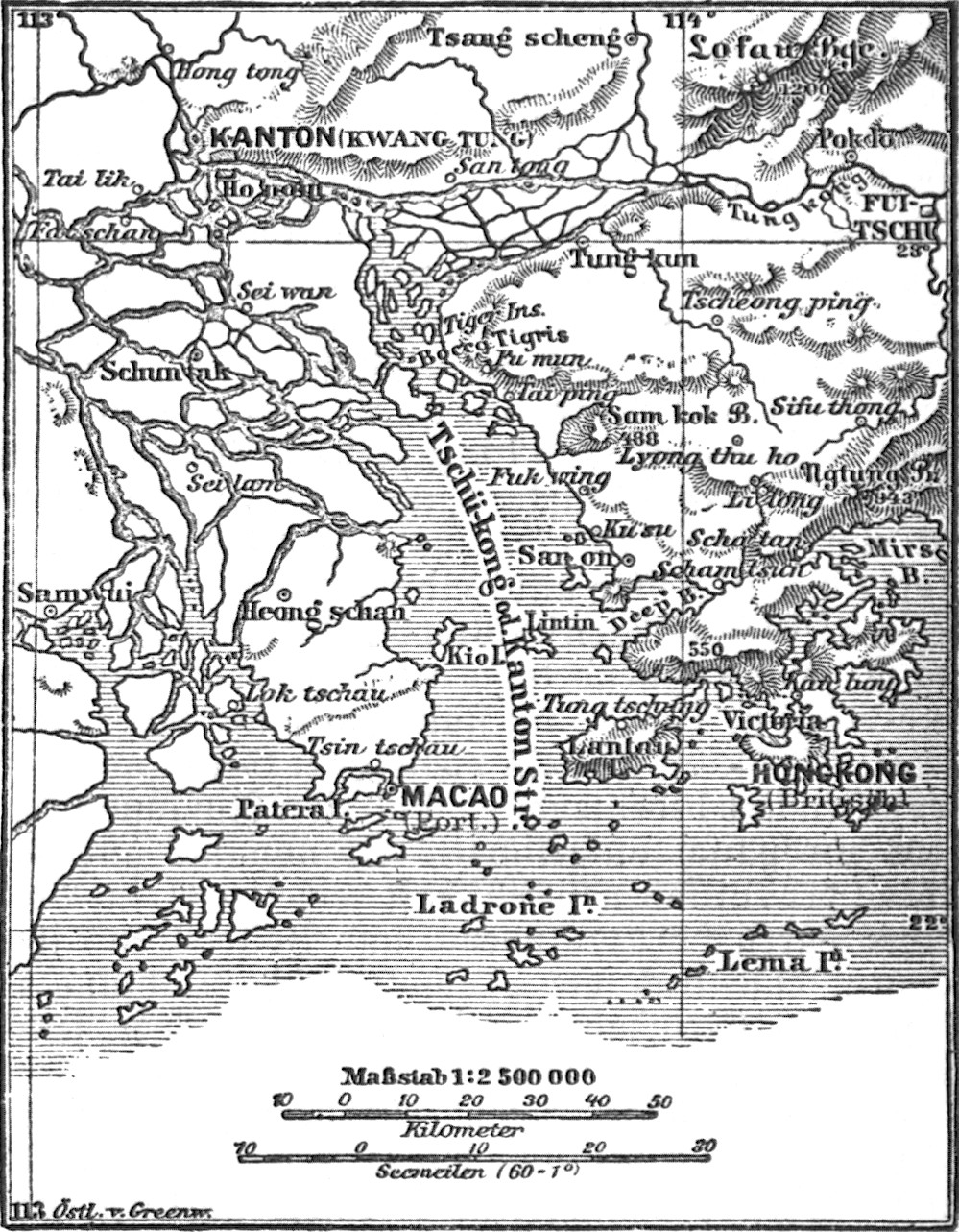
An 1890 map of the mouth of the Pearl River Delta, showing the locations of Macau and Hong Kong

Until 1985, the PRD had been mainly dominated by farms and small rural villages, but after the economy was reformed and opened, a flood of investment turned it into the land's economic powerhouse. The PRD's startling growth was fueled by foreign investment coming largely from Hong Kong manufacturers that moved their operations into the PRD. In 2003, Hong Kong companies employed 11 million workers in their PRD operations. Since 2011, the region has experienced a severe labor shortage due to rapid economic growth, resulting in wages rising by approximately 20% to 30% between 2011 and 2012. Household survey data confirmed this upward wage trend. Between 2011 (the year official household disposable income data was updated) and 2013, domestic household disposable income per capita increased by more than a quarter, exceeding the 19% growth rate of nominal GDP per capita. Therefore, the share of labor compensation in GDP appears to have increased, while companies face profit pressure.

== Economy ==
The Pearl River Delta has been one of the most economically dynamic regions of the People's Republic of China since the launch of China's reform programme in 1979. With annual gross domestic product growth of 13.45 percent over three decades since 1978, it is 3.5 percentage points higher than the national average. Since 1978 almost 30 percent of all foreign investment in China was in the PRD. In 2007 its GDP rose to US$448 billion which makes its economy about the size of Taiwan's and by 2019 this figure has increased to US$2.0 trillion or about the same size as Canada. The abundance of employment opportunities created a pool of wealthy, middle-income, professional consumers with an annual per capita income that puts them among China's wealthiest. Since the onset of China's reform program, the Pearl River Delta Economic Zone has been the fastest growing portion of the fastest growing province in the fastest growing large economy in the world.

The industrial cities in the Pearl River Delta have been called the "Factory of the World" or the "World's Factory" due to the presence of industrial parks populated with factories from foreign investments. However, the target market of the delta region's exports has become increasingly domestic rather than foreign. Dongguan, Zhongshan, Nanhai, and Shunde are the four cities known as the Four Guangdong Dragons for their high growth rates and rapid development from late the 1980s to the 2000s.

Although the Pearl River Delta Economic Zone encompasses only 0.4 percent of the land area and only 3.2 percent of the 2000 census population of mainland China, it accounted for 8.7 percent of GDP, 35.8 percent of total trade, and 29.2 percent of utilised foreign capital in 2001. By 2016 the Pearl River Delta accounted for 9.1 percent of China's GDP. These figures show the remarkable level of economic development to which the Pearl River Delta has been subjected in order to become an 'Economic Zone', as well as the international orientation of the region's economy. This orientation has attracted numerous investors from all over the world who use the Greater Pearl River Delta region as a platform for serving global and Chinese markets.

The economic recession and structural crisis in the Pearl River Delta began around 2008, triggered by the global financial crisis. This major shock exposed deeper challenges such as rising local costs and declining overseas demand.

As of 2008, the Central Government has introduced new labor laws, environmental and other regulations to reduce pollution, industrial disputes, produce safer working conditions and protect the environment. The costs of producing low margin and commodity goods have increased. This is on top of the rising cost for energy, food, transport and the appreciation of the renminbi against the falling US dollar. Some manufacturers will need to cut costs by moving up the value chain or moving to more undeveloped regions.

In 2025, Guangdong Province, China's largest regional economy, is projected to grow at 3.9%, below the official target and significantly below the national average. As China's largest manufacturing hub, Guangdong's sluggish real estate market continues to negatively impact its economic development.

=== Significance of PRD ===
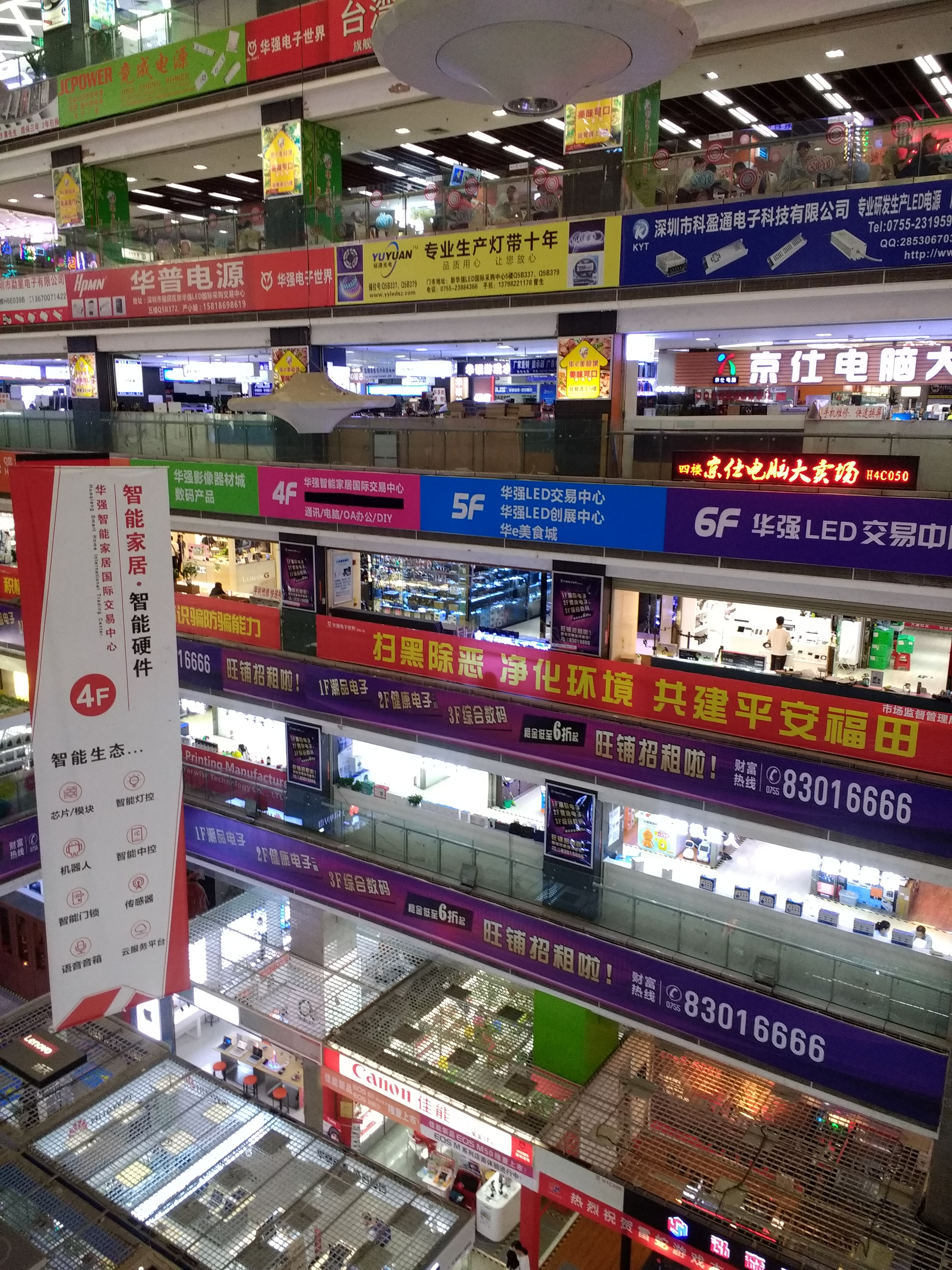
Many electronic markets in Huaqiangbei, Shenzhen specialize in selling electronic components to the manufacturers of electric and electronic goods

The Pearl River Delta established itself as the factory location of choice for global companies that were headquartered in Hong Kong in the 1980s. The industrial output of the Pearl River Delta was generated in the main by state-owned enterprises. Meanwhile, the industrial output of collective-owned enterprises diminished over time, with private enterprises and joint ventures increasing their share of the Pearl River Delta's industrial output to 37.5 percent by the mid-1990s.

Today urban areas with the assistance of the municipal governments in the Pearl River Delta are attempting to rebrand industrial output as originating from "the world's tech lab" or "design studio". The Pearl River Delta has become the world's workshop and is a major manufacturing base for products such as electronics, garments and textiles, plastic products, and a range of other goods.

Private-owned enterprises have developed quickly in the Pearl River Delta Economic Zone and are playing an increasing role in the region's economy, particularly after year 2000 when the development environment for private-owned enterprises has been greatly relaxed.

In 2001 nearly five percent of the world's goods were produced in the Greater Pearl River Delta, with a total export value of US$289 billion. Over 70,000 Hong Kong companies had factory plants in the Greater Pearl River Delta.

== Container shipping ==
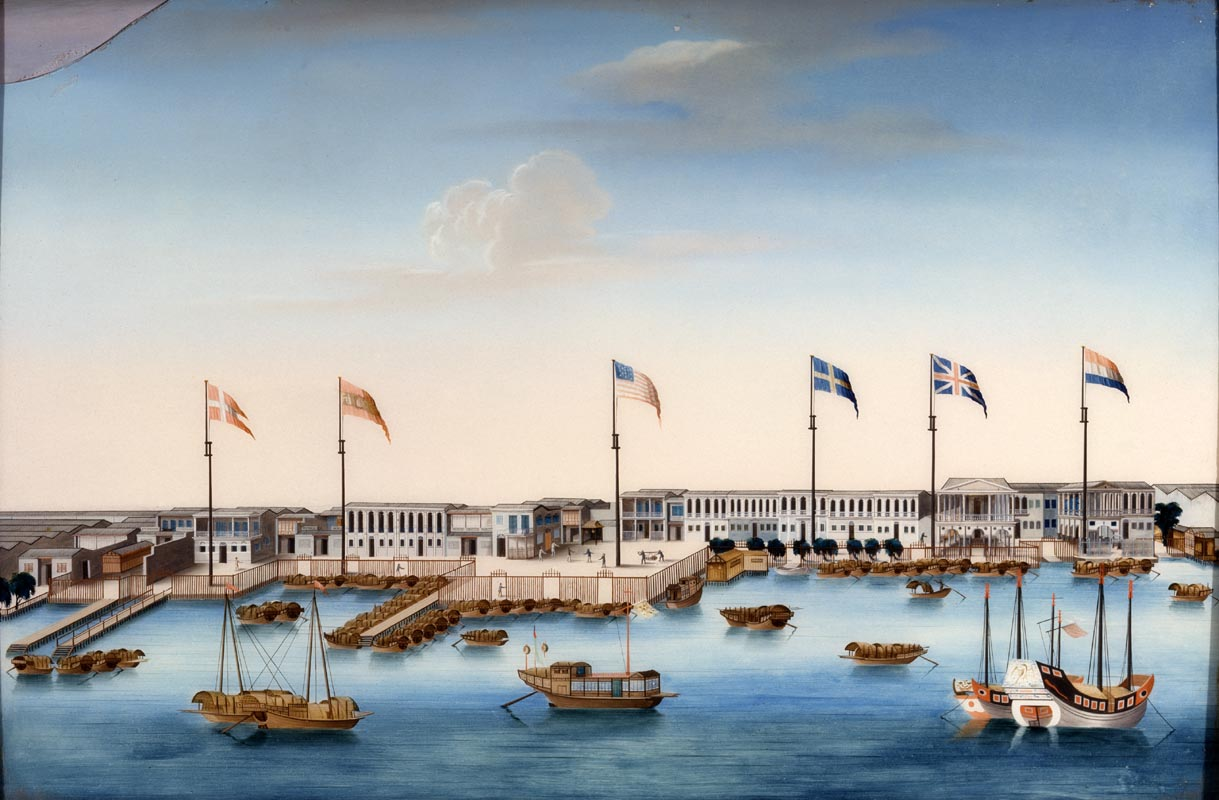
The Thirteen Factories c. 1805, displaying the flags of Denmark, Spain, the United States, Sweden, Britain, and the Netherlands

In the Pearl River Delta an extensive system of container feeder shipping has been established. This system of containerization also serves ports within the same region. The container port of Shenzhen has surpassed Hong Kong as major hub with Guangzhou serving as another significant container shipping hub for the Pearl River Delta.

== Transportation ==
=== Urban rail transport ===
PRD is served by six different metro systems throughout the metropolitan area consisting of Guangzhou Metro, Shenzhen Metro, MTR, FMetro, Macau Light Rail Transit and Dongguan Rail Transit. In addition, the Pearl River Delta Metropolitan Region intercity railway provides regional transit between cities of the PRD.

=== Railway and intercity-rail transport ===
The entire PRD is fully covered by railway, high-speed rail, or intercity-rail services.

- Major stations
  - Guangzhou railway station
  - Guangzhou East railway station
  - Guangzhou South railway station
  - Guangzhou North railway station
  - Shenzhen railway station
  - Shenzhen North railway station
  - Shenzhen East railway station
  - Futian railway station
  - Hong Kong station and Central station
  - Hong Kong West Kowloon railway station
  - Hung Hom station
  - Zhongshan railway station
  - Zhongshan North railway station
  - Zhuhai railway station
  - Zhuhai North railway station
  - Dongguan railway station
  - Dongguan East railway station
  - Foshan railway station
  - Jiangmen railway station
  - Humen railway station
  - Huizhou railway station
  - Zhaoqing railway station
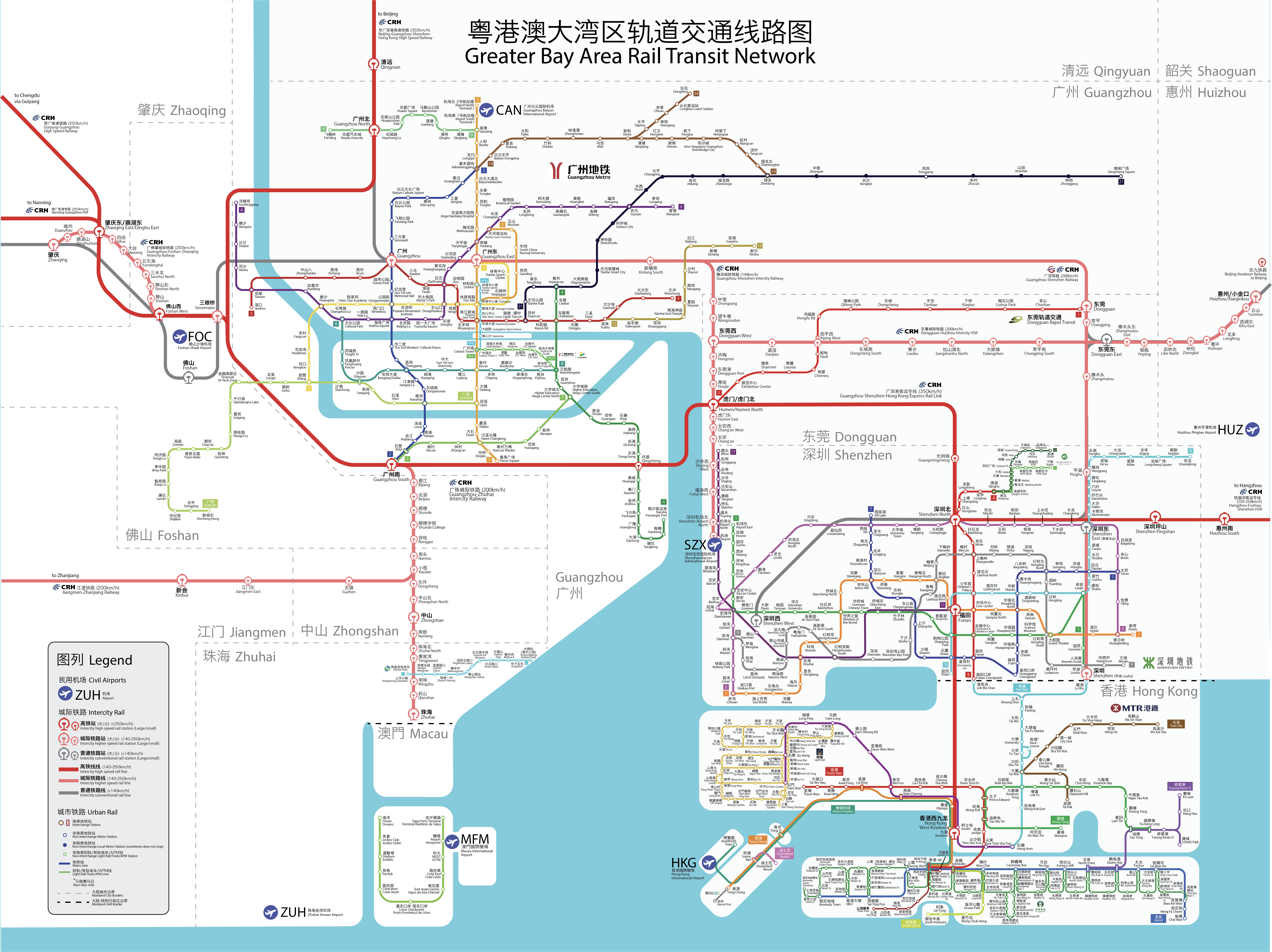
Guangdong-Hong Kong-Macau Bay Area Rail Transit Network in 2020

Guangdong-Hong Kong-Macau Bay Area Rail Transit Network in 2035+

=== Buses, taxis and motorcycles ===
All cities are served by buses and taxis, while some cities may still offer motorcycle service. The Hong Kong–Zhuhai–Macau Bridge provides a road connection across the Pearl River between Hong Kong, Macau, and Zhuhai, and is regularly traversed by buses and other public transit.

=== River transport ===
There are daily high-speed catamaran services throughout the PRD region.

- Guangzhou Ferry
- Cotai Jet
- New World First Ferry
- TurboJET
- Star Ferry
- Hong Kong & Kowloon Ferry
- Discovery Bay Transportation Services
- Park Island Transport
- Fortune Ferry
- Macao Dragon Company
- Coral Sea Ferry
- Chuen Kee Ferry
- Tsui Wah Ferry

== Air transport ==
The PRD is covered by seven civilian airports, with five in mainland China and two in special administrative regions. Two of the mainland airports have international flights.

Mainland China:

- Guangzhou Baiyun International Airport
- Shenzhen Bao'an International Airport
- Zhuhai Jinwan Airport
- Foshan Shadi Airport
- Huizhou Pingtan Airport

Special administrative regions:

- Hong Kong International Airport
- Macau International Airport

Another new airport in the mainland – Pearl River Delta International Airport – located in Gaoming District, Foshan – is under construction.

== Cities ==
Pearl River Delta (Guangdong)
City	Romanization	Stats	Information & Subdivisions	City Map	Image
Guangzhou 广州 / 廣州	Pinyin: Guǎngzhōu; Canton: Guong^{2}zau^{1} Yale: Gwóngjāu; Jyutping: Gwong^{2}zau^{1}	Population: 12,700,800; Area: 7,434 km^{2} Density: 1,708.47/km^{2}	Also known to many English speakers as Canton, Guangzhou is the capital of Guangdong province. It is a port on the Pearl River, navigable to the South China Sea, and is cultural and political center of the Pearl River Delta. Districts: Yuexiu, Liwan, Haizhu, Tianhe, Baiyun, Huangpu, Panyu, Huadu, Nansha, Zengcheng, Conghua; New Area: Nansha		
Shenzhen 深圳	Pinyin: Shēnzhèn; Canton: Sem^{1}zen^{3} Yale: Sāmjan; Jyutping: Sam^{1}zan^{3}	Population: 10,357,938; Area: 1,991 km^{2} Density: 5,202.37/km^{2}	Shenzhen is a Special Economic Zone (SEZ) in China. It has been one of the fastest-growing cities in the world due to its proximity to Hong Kong. It also has one of the busiest ports in the world. Districts: Futian, Luohu, Nanshan, Yantian, Bao'an, Longgang, Pingshan, Longhua, Guangming; New District: Dapeng		
Zhuhai 珠海	Pinyin: Zhūhǎi; Canton: Ju^{6}hoi^{2} Yale: Jyūhói; Jyutping: Zyu^{1}hoi^{2}	Population: 1,560,229; Area: 1,724 km^{2} Density: 905.00/km^{2}	Zhuhai plays a similar role to Shenzhen and became the first of the Special Economic Zones (SEZ) in China. Since the late 1970s it has been one of the fastest-growing cities in the Pearl River Delta due to its proximity to Macau. Districts: Xiangzhou, Doumen, Jinwan; New Area: Hengqin		
Foshan 佛山	Pinyin: Fóshān; Canton: Fed^{6}san^{1} Yale: Fahtsāan; Jyutping: Fat^{6}saan^{1}	Population: 7,194,311; Area: 3,848 km^{2} Density: 1,869.62/km^{2}	Foshan is an old town dated back many centuries. It was famous for its porcelain industry. It is now the third largest city in Guangdong'. The city is relatively affluent when compared to other Chinese cities, and it is home to many large private enterprises. Foshan recently has seen a transformation brought by China's booming economy. City administration is considered especially progressive in seeking foreign direct investment especially in Nanhai District which has closes ties with Guangzhou to form a Guangzhou-Foshan metro in the near future. Districts: Chancheng, Nanhai, Shunde, Sanshui, Gaoming		
Dongguan 东莞 / 東莞	Pinyin: Dōngguǎn; Canton: Dung^{1}gun^{2} Yale: Dūnggún; Jyutping: Dung^{1}gun^{2}	Population: 8,220,237; Area: 2,465 km^{2} Density: 3,334.78/km^{2}	Dongguan borders the provincial capital of Guangzhou to the north, Huizhou to the northeast, Shenzhen to the south, and the Pearl River to the west. It is also home to the world's largest shopping mall, South China Mall. Subdistricts: Dongcheng, Guancheng, Nancheng, Wanjiang; Towns: Chang'an, Changping, Chashan, Dalang, Dalingshan, Daojiao, Dongkeng, Fenggang, Gaobu, Hengli, Hongmei, Houjie, Huangjiang, Humen, Liaobu, Machong, Qiaotou, Qingxi, Qishi, Shatian, Shijie, Shilong, Shipai, Tangxia, Wangniudun, Xiegang, Zhangmutou, Zhongtang		
Zhongshan 中山	Pinyin: Zhōngshān; Canton: Zung^{1}san^{1} Yale: Jūngsāan; Jyutping: Zung^{1}saan^{1}	Population: 3,120,884; Area: 1,783 km^{2} Density: 1,750.35/km^{2}	Zhongshan is a mid-size city named after Sun Yat-sen (who had the alternate name Sun Zhongshan), who is widely considered to be the "Father of modern China" and was born in Zhongshan's Cuiheng village in 1866. Zhongshan serves as a midway point between Guangzhou and Macau. Zhongshan is known in China for making lamps. Subdistricts: Dongqu, Nanqu, Shiqi, Xiqu, Wuguishan Subdistrict, ZTHIDZ (Zhongshangang); Towns: Banfu, Dachong, Dongfeng, Dongsheng, Fusha, Gangkou, Guzhen, Henglan, Huangpu, Nanlang, Nantou, Minzhong, Sanjiao, Sanxiang, Shaxi, Shenwan, Tanzhou, Xiaolan; New Area: Cuiheng		
Jiangmen 江门 / 江門	Pinyin: Jiāngmén; Canton: Gong^{1}mun^{4} Yale: Gōngmùhn; Jyutping: Gong^{1}mun^{4}	Population: 4,448,871; Area: 9,443 km^{2} Density: 471.12/km^{2}	Jiangmen Port is the second largest river port in Guangdong province. The local government plans to develop a harbour industrial zone with heavy industries such as petrochemical and machinery industries. The port of Jiangmen was known as Kong-Moon when it was forced to open to western trade in 1902. One legacy of this period is a historic waterfront district lined with buildings in the treaty port style. The city has an ongoing renewal project which has restored many of these buildings. Districts: Jianghai, Pengjiang, Xinhui; County-level Cities: Enping, Taishan, Kaiping, Heshan		
Huizhou 惠州	Pinyin: Huìzhōu; Canton: Wei^{6}zeo^{1} Yale: Waihjāu; Jyutping: Wai^{6}zau^{1}	Population: 4,597,002; Area: 10,922 km^{2} Density: 420.89/km^{2}	Huizhou is the most eastern city in the Pearl River Delta region. Huizhou is known for its West Lake scenery. Huizhou gained benefit from the reform and opening up of the late 1980s. The blossoming real estate market attracted capital investment from Hong Kong and Taiwan. In the provincial economic development strategy, Huizhou is regarded as a site for a world-class petrochemical industry, as well as a hub for developing information technology, and expanding exports and trade. Districts: Huicheng, Huiyang; Counties: Boluo, Huidong, Longmen		
Zhaoqing 肇庆 / 肇慶	Pinyin: Zhàoqìng; Canton: Xiu^{6} hing^{3} Yale: Siuhhing; Jyutping: Siu^{6} hing^{3}	Population: 3,918,085; Area: 14,891 km^{2} Density: 263.11/km^{2}	Zhaoqing is the most western city in the Pearl River Delta region. It is well known for being a regional tourist hub, a medium-sized provincial "college town" as well as an up-and-coming manufacturing center. Residents from Guangzhou, Shenzhen and other nearby cities, as well as people from Hong Kong and Macau, are known to visit the city on weekend getaways and excursions. Districts: Duanzhou, Dinghu, Gaoyao; Counties: Guangning, Huaiji, Fengkai, Deqing; County-level City: Sihui		
Hong Kong 香港	Pinyin: Xiānggǎng; Canton: Hêng^{1}gong^{2} Yale: Hēunggóng; Jyutping: Hoeng^{1}gong^{2}	Population: 7,061,200; Area: 1,104 km^{2} Density: 6,396.01/km^{2}	Hong Kong Island was first occupied by British forces in 1841, and then formally ceded from China under the Treaty of Nanjing at the end of the First Opium War. Hong Kong remained a crown colony of the United Kingdom until 1997 when it was returned to China. Hong Kong is known as one of the world's leading financial capitals and is also a major business and cultural hub. Districts: Central and Western, Eastern, Southern, Wan Chai, Kowloon City, Kwun Tong, Sham Shui Po, Wong Tai Sin, Yau Tsim Mong, Islands, Kwai Tsing, North, Sai Kung, Sha Tin, Tai Po, Tsuen Wan, Tuen Mun, Yuen Long		
Macau 澳门 / 澳門	Pinyin: Àomén; Canton: Ou^{3}mun^{4} Yale: Oumùhn; Jyutping: Ou^{3}mun^{4-2}	Population: 544,600; Area: 30 km^{2} Density: 18,153.33/km^{2}	Macau was the first Portuguese settlement in China in 1557. Macau remained a colony of Portugal until 1999 when it was returned to China. Macau has developed into a notable tourist industry that boasts a wide range of hotels, resorts, stadiums, restaurants and casinos. This makes it one of the richest cities in the world. Freguesia: Nossa Senhora de Fátima, Santo António, São Lázaro, Sé, São Lourenço, Nossa Senhora do Carmo, São Francisco Xavier; Zone: Cotai		

=== Subdivision ===
Name	City	Type	Population (2010~2011)	Area (km^{2})	Density (/km^{2})
Baiyun	Guangzhou (Yuexiu)	Subdistrict	46,768	3.08	15,184
Beijing	Guangzhou (Yuexiu)	Subdistrict	53,135	0.51	104,186
Dadong	Guangzhou (Yuexiu)	Subdistrict	83,491	1.02	81,853
Datang	Guangzhou (Yuexiu)	Subdistrict	46,124	1.06	43,513
Daxin (Note: Merged into Renmin Subdistrict)	Guangzhou (Yuexiu)	Subdistrict		0.60	
Dengfeng	Guangzhou (Yuexiu)	Subdistrict	92,218	4.98	18,517
Dongfeng (Note: Merged into Liurong Subdistrict)	Guangzhou (Yuexiu)	Subdistrict	92,218	1.40	
Dongshan	Guangzhou (Yuexiu)	Subdistrict	74,299	2.30	32,303
Guangta	Guangzhou (Yuexiu)	Subdistrict	68,128	0.44	154,836
Guangwei (Note: Merged into Beijing Subdistrict)	Guangzhou (Yuexiu)	Subdistrict		0.79	
Hongqiao	Guangzhou (Yuexiu)	Subdistrict	42,258	1.52	27,801
Huale	Guangzhou (Yuexiu)	Subdistrict	47,126	1.28	36,817
Huanghuagang	Guangzhou (Yuexiu)	Subdistrict	99,569	4.43	22,476
Jianshe	Guangzhou (Yuexiu)	Subdistrict	52,110	0.93	56,032
Kuangquan	Guangzhou (Yuexiu)	Subdistrict	90,036	3.01	29,912
Liuhua	Guangzhou (Yuexiu)	Subdistrict	17,253	1.81	9,532
Liurong	Guangzhou (Yuexiu)	Subdistrict	83,996	0.87	96,547
Shishu (Note: Merged into Guangta Subdistrict)	Guangzhou (Yuexiu)	Subdistrict		0.51	
Meihuacun	Guangzhou (Yuexiu)	Subdistrict	85,400	1.73	49,364
Nonglin	Guangzhou (Yuexiu)	Subdistrict	50,152	1.08	46,437
Renmin	Guangzhou (Yuexiu)	Subdistrict	69,274	1.51	45,876
Zhuguang	Guangzhou (Yuexiu)	Subdistrict	56,329	0.93	60,568
Baihedong	Guangzhou (Liwan)	Subdistrict	48,238	3.10	15,560
Caihong	Guangzhou (Liwan)	Subdistrict	54,348	1.06	51,271
Chajiao	Guangzhou (Liwan)	Subdistrict	54,918	4.05	13,560
Changhua	Guangzhou (Liwan)	Subdistrict	32,778	1.61	20,359
Chongkou	Guangzhou (Liwan)	Subdistrict	48,097	4.20	11,451
Dongjiao	Guangzhou (Liwan)	Subdistrict	35,889	4.60	7,801
Dongsha	Guangzhou (Liwan)	Subdistrict	29,013	7.90	3,672
Duobao	Guangzhou (Liwan)	Subdistrict	32,581	0.86	37,884
Fengyuan	Guangzhou (Liwan)	Subdistrict	59,337	0.78	76,073
Hailong	Guangzhou (Liwan)	Subdistrict	31,801	9.49	3,351
Huadi	Guangzhou (Liwan)	Subdistrict	39,635	1.63	24,315
Hualin	Guangzhou (Liwan)	Subdistrict	46,309	0.72	64,318
Jinhua	Guangzhou (Liwan)	Subdistrict	54,670	1.16	47,129
Lingnan	Guangzhou (Liwan)	Subdistrict	27,560	0.90	30,622
Longjin	Guangzhou (Liwan)	Subdistrict	43,518	0.53	82,109
Nanyuan	Guangzhou (Liwan)	Subdistrict	70,066	1.85	37,873
Qiaozhong	Guangzhou (Liwan)	Subdistrict	31,643	4.40	71,91
Shamian	Guangzhou (Liwan)	Subdistrict	3,397	0.30	11,323
Shiweitang	Guangzhou (Liwan)	Subdistrict	57,192	5.18	11,040
Xicun	Guangzhou (Liwan)	Subdistrict	45,069	3.27	13,782
Zhanqian	Guangzhou (Liwan)	Subdistrict	27,431	0.96	28,573
Zhongnan	Guangzhou (Liwan)	Subdistrict	24,710	7.00	3,530
Binjiang	Guangzhou (Haizhu)	Subdistrict	72,324	16.07	4,500
Changgang	Guangzhou (Haizhu)	Subdistrict	97,986	1.96	49,992
Chigang	Guangzhou (Haizhu)	Subdistrict	114,978	5.73	20,065
Fengyang	Guangzhou (Haizhu)	Subdistrict	162,641	9.30	17,488
Guanzhou	Guangzhou (Haizhu)	Subdistrict	57,869	11.20	5,166
Haichuang	Guangzhou (Haizhu)	Subdistrict	62,884	1.45	43,368
Huazhou	Guangzhou (Haizhu)	Subdistrict	49,742	12.20	4,077
Jianghai	Guangzhou (Haizhu)	Subdistrict	115,157	5.30	21,727
Jiangnanzhong	Guangzhou (Haizhu)	Subdistrict	75,220	2.36	31,872
Longfeng	Guangzhou (Haizhu)	Subdistrict	102,561	2.38	43,092
Nanhuaxi	Guangzhou (Haizhu)	Subdistrict	37,960	1.10	34,509
Nanshitou	Guangzhou (Haizhu)	Subdistrict	123,043	4.80	25,633
Nanzhou	Guangzhou (Haizhu)	Subdistrict	84,726	12.30	6,888
Pazhou	Guangzhou (Haizhu)	Subdistrict	29,851	10.00	2,985
Ruibao	Guangzhou (Haizhu)	Subdistrict	125,399	6.30	19,904
Shayuan	Guangzhou (Haizhu)	Subdistrict	67,322	1.44	46,751
Sushe	Guangzhou (Haizhu)	Subdistrict	67,103	1.68	39,942
Xingang	Guangzhou (Haizhu)	Subdistrict	111,897	3.85	29,064
Changxing	Guangzhou (Tianhe)	Subdistrict	66,098	13.21	5,003
Chebei	Guangzhou (Tianhe)	Subdistrict	102,787	5.60	18,354
Fenghuang	Guangzhou (Tianhe)	Subdistrict	19,534	22.99	849
Huangcun	Guangzhou (Tianhe)	Subdistrict	29,501	6.17	4,781
Liede	Guangzhou (Tianhe)	Subdistrict	22,522	3.10	7,265
Linhe	Guangzhou (Tianhe)	Subdistrict	59,732	3.80	15,718
Longdong	Guangzhou (Tianhe)	Subdistrict	70,055	11.70	5,987
Qianjin	Guangzhou (Tianhe)	Subdistrict	59,700	4.90	12,183
Shadong	Guangzhou (Tianhe)	Subdistrict	29,522	2.16	13,667
Shahe	Guangzhou (Tianhe)	Subdistrict	42,814	1.26	33,979
Shipai	Guangzhou (Tianhe)	Subdistrict	177,198	4.30	41,208
Tangxia	Guangzhou (Tianhe)	Subdistrict	177,864	7.42	23,970
Tianhenan	Guangzhou (Tianhe)	Subdistrict	62,912	2.08	30,246
Tianyuan	Guangzhou (Tianhe)	Subdistrict	54,769	4.03	13,590
Wushan	Guangzhou (Tianhe)	Subdistrict	131,795	10.59	12,445
Xiancun	Guangzhou (Tianhe)	Subdistrict	51,284	4.07	12,600
Xinghua	Guangzhou (Tianhe)	Subdistrict	68,139	4.28	15,920
Xintang	Guangzhou (Tianhe)	Subdistrict	41,207	14.95	2,756
Yuancun	Guangzhou (Tianhe)	Subdistrict	81,831	5.37	15,238
Yuangang	Guangzhou (Tianhe)	Subdistrict	30,610	3.23	9,476
Zhuji	Guangzhou (Tianhe)	Subdistrict	52,552	10.01	5,249
Jingtai	Guangzhou (Baiyun)	Subdistrict	82,226	11.40	7,212
Songzhou	Guangzhou (Baiyun)	Subdistrict	106,274	9.30	11,427
Tongde	Guangzhou (Baiyun)	Subdistrict	105,310	3.60	29,252
Huangshi	Guangzhou (Baiyun)	Subdistrict	117,339	5.71	20,549
Tangjing	Guangzhou (Baiyun)	Subdistrict	89,895	4.23	21,251
Xinshi	Guangzhou (Baiyun)	Subdistrict	76,146	3.36	21,449
Yuncheng (Note: Split from Xinshi Subdistrict)	Guangzhou (Baiyun)	Subdistrict	not established	3.74	—
Sanyuanli	Guangzhou (Baiyun)	Subdistrict	100,149	6.80	14,727
Tonghe	Guangzhou (Baiyun)	Subdistrict	89,362	24.25	3,685
Jingxi	Guangzhou (Baiyun)	Subdistrict	91,970	5.51	16,691
Yongping	Guangzhou (Baiyun)	Subdistrict	124,000	14.44	8,587
Junhe	Guangzhou (Baiyun)	Subdistrict	124,909	19.80	6,308
Jinsha	Guangzhou (Baiyun)	Subdistrict	52,657	10.20	5,162
Shijing	Guangzhou (Baiyun)	Subdistrict	69,674	3.48	5,321
Baiyunhu (Note: Split from Shijing Subdistrict)	Guangzhou (Baiyun)	Subdistrict	not established	16.00	—
Shimen (Note: Split from Shijing Subdistrict)	Guangzhou (Baiyun)	Subdistrict	not established	19.80	—
Jiahe	Guangzhou (Baiyun)	Subdistrict	43,848	4.00	8,769
Helong (Note: Split from Jiahe Subdistrict)	Guangzhou (Baiyun)	Subdistrict	not established	6.00	—
Renhe	Guangzhou (Baiyun)	Town	127,795	74.10	1,724
Taihe	Guangzhou (Baiyun)	Town	208,589	155.37	1,342
Jianggao	Guangzhou (Baiyun)	Town	161,343	95.71	1,685
Zhongluotan	Guangzhou (Baiyun)	Town	192,322	169.40	1,135
Dasha	Guangzhou (Huangpu)	Subdistrict	44,641	13.10	3,407
Huangpu	Guangzhou (Huangpu)	Subdistrict	64,255	7.38	8,706
Hongshan	Guangzhou (Huangpu)	Subdistrict	42,127	7.30	5,770
Yuzhu	Guangzhou (Huangpu)	Subdistrict	59,529	9.11	6,534
Wenchong	Guangzhou (Huangpu)	Subdistrict	46,877	10.07	4,655
Nangang	Guangzhou (Huangpu)	Subdistrict	76,747	13.74	5,585
Changzhou	Guangzhou (Huangpu)	Subdistrict	36,478	11.50	3,172
Suidong	Guangzhou (Huangpu)	Subdistrict	45,025	13.58	3,315
Lilian	Guangzhou (Huangpu)	Subdistrict	42,251	6.58	6,421
Luogang	Guangzhou (Huangpu)	Subdistrict	45,717	80.10	570
Xiagang	Guangzhou (Huangpu)	Subdistrict	44,528	14.54	3,062
Dongqu	Guangzhou (Huangpu)	Subdistrict	85,235	54.00	1,578
Lianhe	Guangzhou (Huangpu)	Subdistrict	49,867	51.76	963
Yonghe	Guangzhou (Huangpu)	Subdistrict	55,044	34.00	1,618
Jiulong	Guangzhou (Huangpu)	Town	93,265	175.10	532
Shiqiao	Guangzhou (Panyu)	Subdistrict	168,701	20.15	8,372
Zhongcun	Guangzhou (Panyu)	Subdistrict	104,598	23.41	4,468
Shibi	Guangzhou (Panyu)	Subdistrict	32,989	27.01	1,221
Dashi	Guangzhou (Panyu)	Subdistrict	116,107	19.34	6,003
Luopu	Guangzhou (Panyu)	Subdistrict	89,294	25.38	3,518
Dalong	Guangzhou (Panyu)	Subdistrict	129,515	24.80	5,222
Donghuan	Guangzhou (Panyu)	Subdistrict	52,965	11.00	4,815
Qiaonan	Guangzhou (Panyu)	Subdistrict	72,695	17.85	4,072
Shatou	Guangzhou (Panyu)	Subdistrict	35,201	18.10	1,944
Xiaoguwei	Guangzhou (Panyu)	Subdistrict	131,470	20.15	6,524
Nancun	Guangzhou (Panyu)	Town	129,076	47.00	2,746
Xinzao	Guangzhou (Panyu)	Town	27,248	14.12	1,929
Hualong	Guangzhou (Panyu)	Town	53,142	55.70	954
Shilou	Guangzhou (Panyu)	Town	90,381	126.50	714
Shiqi	Guangzhou (Panyu)	Town	97,434	71.26	1,367
Shawan	Guangzhou (Panyu)	Town	88,695	37.45	2,368
Xinhua	Guangzhou (Huadu)	Subdistrict	381,311	29.81	6,764
Huacheng (Note: Split from Xinhua Subdistrict)	Guangzhou (Huadu)	Subdistrict	not established	26.56	—
Xinya (Note: Formerly known as Yayao)	Guangzhou (Huadu)	Subdistrict	20,520	32.98	235
Xiuquan (Note: Split from Xinhua Subdistrict)	Guangzhou (Huadu)	Subdistrict	not established	54.19	—
Timian	Guangzhou (Huadu)	Town	9,516	91.20	104
Huashan	Guangzhou (Huadu)	Town	99,262	116.40	852
Tanbu	Guangzhou (Huadu)	Town	55,797	113.33	492
Chini	Guangzhou (Huadu)	Town	56,609	160.03	353
Shiling	Guangzhou (Huadu)	Town	203,254	136.31	1,491
Huadong	Guangzhou (Huadu)	Town	118,736	208.44	569
Nansha	Guangzhou (Nansha)	Subdistrict	112,151	57.80	1,940
Zhujiang	Guangzhou (Nansha)	Subdistrict	28,575	41.50	688
Longxue (Note: Split from Wanqingsha Town)	Guangzhou (Nansha)	Subdistrict	not established	128.90	—
Wanqingsha	Guangzhou (Nansha)	Town	44,891	319.20	100
Huangge	Guangzhou (Nansha)	Town	43,791	76.50	572
Hengli	Guangzhou (Nansha)	Town	30,492	54.00	564
Dongchong	Guangzhou (Nansha)	Town	147,228	92.00	1,600
Dagang	Guangzhou (Nansha)	Town	125,011	90.07	1,387
Lanhe	Guangzhou (Nansha)	Town	73,078	74.48	981
Jiekou	Guangzhou (Conghua)	Subdistrict	96,846	21.84	4,434
Chengjiao	Guangzhou (Conghua)	Subdistrict	79,085	160.00	494
Jiangbu	Guangzhou (Conghua)	Subdistrict	95,843	127.00	754
Wenquan	Guangzhou (Conghua)	Town	55,194	210.90	261
Liangkou	Guangzhou (Conghua)	Town	32,829	530.60	61
Lütian	Guangzhou (Conghua)	Town	23,430	393.00	59
Taiping	Guangzhou (Conghua)	Town	94,369	210.32	448
Aotou	Guangzhou (Conghua)	Town	111,308	410.00	271
Licheng	Guangzhou (Zengcheng)	Subdistrict	191,777	132.27	1,449
Zengjiang	Guangzhou (Zengcheng)	Subdistrict	78,072	86.18	905
Zhucun	Guangzhou (Zengcheng)	Subdistrict	43,557	93.90	463
Yongning (Note: Split from Xintang Town)	Guangzhou (Zengcheng)	Subdistrict	not established	104.14	—
Zhengguo	Guangzhou (Zengcheng)	Town	40,387	236.40	170
Shitan	Guangzhou (Zengcheng)	Town	121,674	184.00	661
Xintang	Guangzhou (Zengcheng)	Town	391,287	85.09	4,598
Zhongxin	Guangzhou (Zengcheng)	Town	78,293	236.00	331
Paitan	Guangzhou (Zengcheng)	Town	58,337	289.50	201
Xiaolou	Guangzhou (Zengcheng)	Town	33,725	136.00	247
Xiancun (Note: Split from Xintang Town)	Guangzhou (Zengcheng)	Town	not established	56.65	—
Huangbei	Shenzhen (Luohu)	Subdistrict	113,382	7.50	15,117
Guiyuan	Shenzhen (Luohu)	Subdistrict	82,694	10.90	7,586
Dongmen	Shenzhen (Luohu)	Subdistrict	90,454	2.10	43,073
Cuizhu	Shenzhen (Luohu)	Subdistrict	110,459	3.45	32,017
Dongxiao	Shenzhen (Luohu)	Subdistrict	100,779	3.48	28,959
Nanhu	Shenzhen (Luohu)	Subdistrict	90,500	2.63	34,410
Sungang	Shenzhen (Luohu)	Subdistrict	64,004	4.03	15,881
Donghu	Shenzhen (Luohu)	Subdistrict	84,556	29.05	2,910
Liantang	Shenzhen (Luohu)	Subdistrict	85,569	13.10	6,531
Qingshuihe	Shenzhen (Luohu)	Subdistrict	101,024	13.62	7,417
Shatou	Shenzhen (Futian)	Subdistrict	226,061	18.90	11,960
Nanyuan	Shenzhen (Futian)	Subdistrict	108,398	3.00	36,132
Yuanling	Shenzhen (Futian)	Subdistrict	88,261	3.67	24,049
Huafu	Shenzhen (Futian)	Subdistrict	70,834	5.75	12,318
Futian	Shenzhen (Futian)	Subdistrict	234,861	12.25	19,172
Xiangmihu	Shenzhen (Futian)	Subdistrict	89,471	9.98	8,965
Lianhua	Shenzhen (Futian)	Subdistrict	168,392	9.60	17,540
Meilin	Shenzhen (Futian)	Subdistrict	168,506	34.30	4,912
Huaqiangbei	Shenzhen (Futian)	Subdistrict	54,067	2.90	18,643
Fubao	Shenzhen (Futian)	Subdistrict	106,811	3.75	28,482
Nantou	Shenzhen (Nanshan)	Subdistrict	163,237	16.80	9,716
Nanshan	Shenzhen (Nanshan)	Subdistrict	152,312	23.90	6,372
Shahe	Shenzhen (Nanshan)	Subdistrict	121,350	22.32	5,436
Xili	Shenzhen (Nanshan)	Subdistrict	187,832	49.16	3,820
Shekou	Shenzhen (Nanshan)	Subdistrict	87,304	12.29	7,103
Zhaoshang	Shenzhen (Nanshan)	Subdistrict	79,650	18.36	4,338
Yuehai	Shenzhen (Nanshan)	Subdistrict	157,807	14.40	10,958
Taoyuan	Shenzhen (Nanshan)	Subdistrict	138,853	40.00	3,471
Xin'an	Shenzhen (Bao'an)	Subdistrict	410,056	30.90	13,270
Xixiang	Shenzhen (Bao'an)	Subdistrict	580,736	106.00	5,478
Songgang	Shenzhen (Bao'an)	Subdistrict	398,153	64.00	6,221
Shajing	Shenzhen (Bao'an)	Subdistrict	529,041	60.00	8,817
Fuyong	Shenzhen (Bao'an)	Subdistrict	472,792	66.20	7,141
Shiyan	Shenzhen (Bao'an)	Subdistrict	248,139	64.60	3,841
Hangcheng (Note: Split from Xixiang Subdistrict)	Shenzhen (Bao'an)	Subdistrict	not established		—
Fuhai (Note: Split from Fuyong Subdistrict)	Shenzhen (Bao'an)	Subdistrict	not established		—
Xinqiao (Note: Split from Shajing Subdistrict)	Shenzhen (Bao'an)	Subdistrict	not established		—
Yanluo (Note: Split from Songgang Subdistrict)	Shenzhen (Bao'an)	Subdistrict	not established		—
Guangming	Shenzhen (Guangming)	Subdistrict	66,549	55.80	1,192
Gongming	Shenzhen (Guangming)	Subdistrict	414,358	100.30	4,131
Xinhu (Note: Split from Guangming & Gongming Subdistrict)	Shenzhen (Guangming)	Subdistrict	not established		—
Fenghuang (Note: Split from Guangming & Gongming Subdistrict)	Shenzhen (Guangming)	Subdistrict	not established		—
Yutang (Note: Split from Gongming Subdistrict)	Shenzhen (Guangming)	Subdistrict	not established		—
Matian (Note: Split from Gongming Subdistrict)	Shenzhen (Guangming)	Subdistrict	not established		—
Longhua	Shenzhen (Longhua)	Subdistrict	367,521	24.80	14,819
Minzhi	Shenzhen (Longhua)	Subdistrict	281,652	30.69	9,177
Dalang	Shenzhen (Longhua)	Subdistrict	277,689	37.20	7,464
Guanlan	Shenzhen (Longhua)	Subdistrict	452,598	34.60	13,080
Guanhu (Note: Split from Guanlan Subdistrict)	Shenzhen (Longhua)	Subdistrict	not established		—
Fucheng (Note: Split from Longhua Subdistrict)	Shenzhen (Longhua)	Subdistrict	not established		—
Longcheng	Shenzhen (Longgang)	Subdistrict	260,696	77.68	3,356
Longgang	Shenzhen (Longgang)	Subdistrict	215,273	64.84	3,320
Henggang	Shenzhen (Longgang)	Subdistrict	94,801	40.40	2,346
Buji	Shenzhen (Longgang)	Subdistrict	359,770	30.58	11,764
Bantian	Shenzhen (Longgang)	Subdistrict	221,767	28.51	7,778
Nanwan	Shenzhen (Longgang)	Subdistrict	197,431	24.68	7,999
Pinghu	Shenzhen (Longgang)	Subdistrict	228,217	41.80	5,459
Pingdi	Shenzhen (Longgang)	Subdistrict	94,765	53.14	1,783
Baolong (Note: Split from Longgang Subdistrict)	Shenzhen (Longgang)	Subdistrict	not established		—
Jihua (Note: Split from Buji Subdistrict)	Shenzhen (Longgang)	Subdistrict	not established		—
Yuanshan (Note: Split from Henggang Subdistrict)	Shenzhen (Longgang)	Subdistrict	not established		—
Pingshan	Shenzhen (Pingshan)	Subdistrict	205,999	127.22	1,619
Kengzi	Shenzhen (Pingshan)	Subdistrict	94,801	40.40	2,346
Biling (Note: Split from Pingshan Subdistrict)	Shenzhen (Pingshan)	Subdistrict	not established		—
Maluan (Note: Split from Pingshan Subdistrict)	Shenzhen (Pingshan)	Subdistrict	not established		—
Shijing (Note: Split from Pingshan Subdistrict)	Shenzhen (Pingshan)	Subdistrict	not established		—
Longtian (Note: Split from Kengzi Subdistrict)	Shenzhen (Pingshan)	Subdistrict	not established		—
Dapeng	Shenzhen (Dapeng)	Subdistrict	46,867	82.81	565
Kuichong	Shenzhen (Dapeng)	Subdistrict	61,105	103.90	588
Nan'ao	Shenzhen (Dapeng)	Subdistrict	18,588	115.06	161
Haishan	Shenzhen (Yantian)	Subdistrict	61,858	5.52	11,206
Yantian	Shenzhen (Yantian)	Subdistrict	80,641	17.8	4,530
Meisha	Shenzhen (Yantian)	Subdistrict	18,063	16.83	1,073
Shatoujiao	Shenzhen (Yantian)	Subdistrict	48,798	6.91	7,061
Meihua	Zhuhai (Xiangzhou)	Subdistrict	91,172	9.80	9,303
Gongbei	Zhuhai (Xiangzhou)	Subdistrict	105,130	10.00	10,513
Jida	Zhuhai (Xiangzhou)	Subdistrict	81,088	11.70	6,930
Cuixiang	Zhuhai (Xiangzhou)	Subdistrict	106,661	28.00	3,809
Shishan	Zhuhai (Xiangzhou)	Subdistrict	56,956	8.20	6,945
Xiangwan	Zhuhai (Xiangzhou)	Subdistrict	48,482	32.40	1,496
Qianshan	Zhuhai (Xiangzhou)	Subdistrict	184,738	53.00	3,485
Wanzi	Zhuhai (Xiangzhou)	Subdistrict	26,645	30.50	873
Nanping	Zhuhai (Xiangzhou)	Town	70,934	60.70	1,168
Tangjiawan	Zhuhai (Xiangzhou)	Town	109,152	130.00	839
Hengqin	Zhuhai (Xiangzhou)	Town	6,914	476.00	14
Guishan	Zhuhai (Xiangzhou)	Town	1,745	18.00	96
Dan'gan	Zhuhai (Xiangzhou)	Town	1,860	40.00	46
Wanshan	Zhuhai (Xiangzhou)	Town	1,208	23.00	52
Baiteng	Zhuhai (Doumen)	Subdistrict	not established	17.00	—
Jing'an	Zhuhai (Doumen)	Town	172,732	142.00	1,086
Baijiao	Zhuhai (Doumen)	Town	104,568	184.00	568
Ganwu	Zhuhai (Doumen)	Town	57,352	190.60	300
Doumen	Zhuhai (Doumen)	Town	46,549	105.77	440
Lianzhou	Zhuhai (Doumen)	Town	34,681	88.60	391
Sanzao	Zhuhai (Jinwan)	Town	82,221	96.00	856
Hongqi	Zhuhai (Jinwan)	Town	67,631	150.00	450
Pingsha	Zhuhai (Jinwan)	Town	67,149	197.00	340
Nanshui	Zhuhai (Jinwan)	Town	36,962	100.00	369
Zumiao	Foshan (Chancheng)	Subdistrict	416,800	31.60	13,189
Shiwanzhen	Foshan (Chancheng)	Subdistrict	286,226	26.62	10,752
Zhangcha	Foshan (Chancheng)	Subdistrict	241,149	26.50	9,099
Nanzhuang	Foshan (Chancheng)	Town	156,902	76.70	2,045
Guicheng	Foshan (Nanhai)	Subdistrict	542,775	84.16	6,449
Lishui	Foshan (Nanhai)	Town	273,914	75.38	3,633
Jiujiang	Foshan (Nanhai)	Town	170,179	94.75	1,796
Danzao	Foshan (Nanhai)	Town	154,955	143.50	1,079
Dali	Foshan (Nanhai)	Town	614,837	95.90	6,411
Shishan	Foshan (Nanhai)	Town	610,514	330.60	1,846
Xiqiao	Foshan (Nanhai)	Town	221,670	176.63	1,254
Daliang	Foshan (Shunde)	Subdistrict	404,309	80.19	5,041
Ronggui	Foshan (Shunde)	Subdistrict	449,687	80.17	5,609
Leliu	Foshan (Shunde)	Subdistrict	252,364	90.84	2,778
Lunjiao	Foshan (Shunde)	Subdistrict	184,479	59.21	3,115
Beijiao	Foshan (Shunde)	Town	270,310	92.41	2,925
Lecong	Foshan (Shunde)	Town	259,795	77.55	3350
Jun'an	Foshan (Shunde)	Town	141,736	79.36	1,785
Xingtan	Foshan (Shunde)	Town	144,537	122.07	1184
Chencun	Foshan (Shunde)	Town	135,686	50.92	2,664
Longjiang	Foshan (Shunde)	Town	221,881	73.78	3,007
Xinan	Foshan (Sanshui)	Subdistrict	283,819	178.00	1,594
Yundonghai	Foshan (Sanshui)	Subdistrict	29,953	56.00	534
Lubao	Foshan (Sanshui)	Town	40,626	105.00	386
Datang	Foshan (Sanshui)	Town	46,704	98.23	475
Leping	Foshan (Sanshui)	Town	134,508	198.50	677
Baini	Foshan (Sanshui)	Town	64,425	66.46	969
Nanshan	Foshan (Sanshui)	Town	22,610	115.62	195
Hecheng	Foshan (Gaoming)	Subdistrict	278,454	178.58	1,559
Yanghe	Foshan (Gaoming)	Town	53,224	246.27	216
Genghe	Foshan (Gaoming)	Town	46,528	365.00	127
Mingcheng	Foshan (Gaoming)	Town	41,838	186.50	224
Guancheng	Dongguan	Subdistrict	162,116	13.5	12,008
Dongcheng	Dongguan	Subdistrict	492,875	110.0	4,480
Nancheng	Dongguan	Subdistrict	289,255	59.0	4,902.62
Wanjiang	Dongguan	Subdistrict	244,765	50.5	4,846
Shilong	Dongguan	Town	141,850	11.3	12,553
Gaobu	Dongguan	Town	217,436	30.0	7,247
Zhongtang	Dongguan	Town	139,563	60.0	2,326
Machong	Dongguan	Town	118,062	74.0	1,595
Wangniudun	Dongguan	Town	84,786	31.5	2,685
Hongmei	Dongguan	Town	58,114	33.0	1,761
Shijie	Dongguan	Town	246,960	36.0	6,860
Daojiao	Dongguan	Town	143,107	63.0	2,271
Shatian	Dongguan	Town	177,482	107.0	1,658
Houjie	Dongguan	Town	438,283	126.0	3,478
Humen	Dongguan	Town	638,657	178.5	3,577
Chang'an	Dongguan	Town	664,230	97.8	6,791
Dalingshan	Dongguan	Town	279,414	110.0	2,540
Dalang	Dongguan	Town	310,889	118.0	2,634
Huangjiang	Dongguan	Town	231,399	98.0	2,361
Liaobu	Dongguan	Town	418,578	87.5	4,783
Fenggang	Dongguan	Town	318,971	82.5	3,866
Tangxia	Dongguan	Town	482,067	128.0	3,766
Qingxi	Dongguan	Town	312,639	143.0	2,186
Zhangmutou	Dongguan	Town	132,816	118.8	1,117
Xiegang	Dongguan	Town	99,387	103.0	964
Changping	Dongguan	Town	386,378	108.0	3,577
Qiaotou	Dongguan	Town	166,774	56.0	2,978
Qishi	Dongguan	Town	121,693	51.0	2,386
Hengli	Dongguan	Town	204,830	50.0	4,096
Dongkeng	Dongguan	Town	138,819	27.5	5,047
Chashan	Dongguan	Town	156,522	51.0	3,069
Shipai	Dongguan	Town	160,202	56.0	2,860
Shiqi	Zhongshan	Subdistrict	206,362	22.5	9,171
Dongqu	Zhongshan	Subdistrict	153,477	73.1	2,099
Nanqu	Zhongshan	Subdistrict	64,548	25.1	2,571
Xiqu	Zhongshan	Subdistrict	97,864	49.1	1,993
THIDZ (Zhongshangang)	Zhongshan	Subdistrict	229,997	158.7	1,449
Wuguishan	Zhongshan	Subdistrict	48,019	101.2	474
Huangpu	Zhongshan	Town	145,017	88.3	1,642
Nantou	Zhongshan	Town	130,712	25.7	5,086
Dongfeng	Zhongshan	Town	123,562	56.2	2,198
Fusha	Zhongshan	Town	57,570	35.4	1,626
Xiaolan	Zhongshan	Town	315,626	71.9	4,389
Dongsheng	Zhongshan	Town	118,052	76.7	1,539
Guzhen	Zhongshan	Town	147,440	52.2	2,824
Henglan	Zhongshan	Town	103,135	75.7	1,362
Sanjiao	Zhongshan	Town	121,770	70.1	1,737
Minzhong	Zhongshan	Town	108,417	121.8	890
Nanlang	Zhongshan	Town	107,977	152.4	708
Gangkou	Zhongshan	Town	113,748	71.2	1,597
Dachong	Zhongshan	Town	74,276	40.6	1,829
Shenwan	Zhongshan	Town	31,392	52.4	599
Sanxiang	Zhongshan	Town	200,197	93.6	2,138
Banfu	Zhongshan	Town	82,412	79.6	1,035
Shaxi	Zhongshan	Town	119,372	60.9	1,960
Tanzhou	Zhongshan	Town	219,943	129.5	1,698
Huanshi	Jiangmen (Pengjiang)	Subdistrict	119,423	34.0	3,512
Canghou (Note: Merged into Baisha Subdistrict)	Jiangmen (Pengjiang)	Subdistrict	59,565	5.0	11,913
Didong (Note: Merged into Baisha Subdistrict)	Jiangmen (Pengjiang)	Subdistrict	76,765	3.7	20,747
Beijie (Note: Merged into Baisha Subdistrict)	Jiangmen (Pengjiang)	Subdistrict	58,374	8.35	6,990
Baisha	Jiangmen (Pengjiang)	Subdistrict	109,791	8.17	13,438
Chaolian	Jiangmen (Pengjiang)	Subdistrict	29,395	12.68	2,318
Tangxia	Jiangmen (Pengjiang)	Town	76,021	131.1	579
Hetang	Jiangmen (Pengjiang)	Town	88,085	32.0	2,752
Duruan	Jiangmen (Pengjiang)	Town	101,727	80.9	1,257
Jiangnan	Jiangmen (Jianghai)	Subdistrict	31,700	2.7	11,740
Waihai	Jiangmen (Jianghai)	Subdistrict	94,666	46.0	2,057
Lile	Jiangmen (Jianghai)	Subdistrict	82,612	49.8	1,658
Jiaobei (Note: Merged into Jiangnan Subdistrict)	Jiangmen (Jianghai)	Subdistrict	9,363	3.7	2,530
Jiaotou (Note: Merged into Jiangnan Subdistrict)	Jiangmen (Jianghai)	Subdistrict	35,972	4.8	7,494
Huicheng	Jiangmen (Xinhui)	Subdistrict	385,177	143.86	2,677
Daze	Jiangmen (Xinhui)	Town	37,677	83.50	451
Siqian	Jiangmen (Xinhui)	Town	69,935	89.54	781
Luokeng	Jiangmen (Xinhui)	Town	31,527	117.88	267
Shuangshui	Jiangmen (Xinhui)	Town	87,295	207.44	420
Yamen	Jiangmen (Xinhui)	Town	37,963	289.09	131
Shadui	Jiangmen (Xinhui)	Town	36,957	96.25	383
Gujing	Jiangmen (Xinhui)	Town	42,027	112.31	374
Sanjiang	Jiangmen (Xinhui)	Town	43,113	82.43	523
Muzhou	Jiangmen (Xinhui)	Town	42,117	79.79	527
Da'ao	Jiangmen (Xinhui)	Town	35,367	52.56	672
Taicheng	Jiangmen (Taishan)	Subdistrict	246,844	159.7	1,545
Dajiang	Jiangmen (Taishan)	Town	46,674	69.8	668
Shuibu	Jiangmen (Taishan)	Town	42,578	110.9	383
Sijiu	Jiangmen (Taishan)	Town	37,402	260	143
Baisha	Jiangmen (Taishan)	Town	52,462	123	426
Sanhe	Jiangmen (Taishan)	Town	36,215	250	144
Chonglou	Jiangmen (Taishan)	Town	32,483	125	259
Doushan	Jiangmen (Taishan)	Town	48,229	121.25	397
Duhu	Jiangmen (Taishan)	Town	42,657	164.23	259
Chixi	Jiangmen (Taishan)	Town	34,450	254.2	135
Duanfen	Jiangmen (Taishan)	Town	45,729	300	152
Guanghai	Jiangmen (Taishan)	Town	43,465	132.58	327
Haiyan	Jiangmen (Taishan)	Town	73,212	330	221
Wencun	Jiangmen (Taishan)	Town	49,565	175	283
Shenjing	Jiangmen (Taishan)	Town	52,767	315.3	167
Beidou	Jiangmen (Taishan)	Town	28,091	196	143
Chuandao	Jiangmen (Taishan)	Town	28,272	254.3	111
Sanbu	Jiangmen (Kaiping)	Subdistrict	173,100	32.4	5,342
Changsha	Jiangmen (Kaiping)	Subdistrict	124,829	54	2,311
Shatang	Jiangmen (Kaiping)	Town	24,667	88	280
Chacheng	Jiangmen (Kaiping)	Town	26,750	138.6	193
Longsheng	Jiangmen (Kaiping)	Town	26,161	126	207
Dasha	Jiangmen (Kaiping)	Town	22,298	215.6	103
Magang	Jiangmen (Kaiping)	Town	30,728	92.3	332
Tangkou	Jiangmen (Kaiping)	Town	22,626	73.5	307
Chikan	Jiangmen (Kaiping)	Town	37,260	61.4	606
Baihe	Jiangmen (Kaiping)	Town	17,621	66.1	266
Xiangang	Jiangmen (Kaiping)	Town	13,280	78	170
Jinji	Jiangmen (Kaiping)	Town	16,493	149.5	110
Yueshan	Jiangmen (Kaiping)	Town	46,700	121.12	385
Chishui	Jiangmen (Kaiping)	Town	25,894	145	178
Shuikou	Jiangmen (Kaiping)	Town	90,835	33.1	2,744
Shaping	Jiangmen (Kaiping)	Subdistrict	197,155	50	3,943
Longkou	Jiangmen (Heshan)	Town	36,625	96	381
Yayao	Jiangmen (Heshan)	Town	38,851	82.3	472
Gulao	Jiangmen (Heshan)	Town	35,606	68.12	522
Taoyuan	Jiangmen (Heshan)	Town	25,902	54	479
Hecheng	Jiangmen (Heshan)	Town	32,170	178	180
Gonghe	Jiangmen (Heshan)	Town	41,338	90.07	458
Zhishan	Jiangmen (Heshan)	Town	32,009	61.38	521
Zhaiwu	Jiangmen (Heshan)	Town	26,254	205.06	128
Yunxiang (Note: Merged into Shishan Town)	Jiangmen (Heshan)	Town	12,453	36.83	338
Shuanghe	Jiangmen (Heshan)	Town	16,575	149.4	110
Encheng	Jiangmen (Enping)	Subdistrict	197,788	162.5	1,217
Hengbei	Jiangmen (Enping)	Town	31,694	126.5	250
Shengtang	Jiangmen (Enping)	Town	25,038	56.65	441
Liangxi	Jiangmen (Enping)	Town	20,091	121.75	165
Shahu	Jiangmen (Enping)	Town	56,217	250	224
Niujiang	Jiangmen (Enping)	Town	23,430	91	257
Juntang	Jiangmen (Enping)	Town	46,475	100.6	461
Datian	Jiangmen (Enping)	Town	27,943	202.36	138
Naji	Jiangmen (Enping)	Town	19,384	260	74
Dahuai	Jiangmen (Enping)	Town	18,625	97.2	191
Dongcheng	Jiangmen (Enping)	Town	26,129	50.4	518
Qiaodong	Huizhou (Huicheng)	Subdistrict	100,374	13.57	
Qiaoxi	Huizhou (Huicheng)	Subdistrict	159,591	8.8	
Jiangnan	Huizhou (Huicheng)	Subdistrict	74,602	28	
Jiangbei	Huizhou (Huicheng)	Subdistrict	104,494	15	
Longfeng	Huizhou (Huicheng)	Subdistrict	81,053	46	
Henan'an	Huizhou (Huicheng)	Subdistrict	181,755	45	
Huihuan	Huizhou (Huicheng)	Subdistrict	173,852	36	
Chenjiang	Huizhou (Huicheng)	Subdistrict	138,694	83	
Shuikou	Huizhou (Huicheng)	Subdistrict	137,286	120	
Xiaojinkou	Huizhou (Huicheng)	Subdistrict	105,554	66.7	
Ruhu	Huizhou (Huicheng)	Town	45,990	173	
Sandong	Huizhou (Huicheng)	Town	35,410	67.8	
Tonghu	Huizhou (Huicheng)	Town	35,706	112.5	
Lilin	Huizhou (Huicheng)	Town	57,476	49	
Ma'an	Huizhou (Huicheng)	Town	55,414	76	
Hengli	Huizhou (Huicheng)	Town	44,488	343	
Luzhou	Huizhou (Huicheng)	Town	15,890	160	
Tongqiao	Huizhou (Huicheng)	Town	30,335	31	
Danshui	Huizhou (Huiyang)	Subdistrict	226,703	80	
Qiuchang	Huizhou (Huiyang)	Subdistrict	81,224	109.9	
Aotou	Huizhou (Huiyang)	Subdistrict	58,766	110	
Xiayong	Huizhou (Huiyang)	Subdistrict	19,304	80.8	
Yonghu	Huizhou (Huiyang)	Town	25,575	130	
Liangjing	Huizhou (Huiyang)	Town	25,043	72.6	
Pingtan	Huizhou (Huiyang)	Town	32,271	105	
Shatian	Huizhou (Huiyang)	Town	29,276	85	
Xinxu	Huizhou (Huiyang)	Town	83,283	158.4	
Zhenlong	Huizhou (Huiyang)	Town	46,982	115.3	
Luoyang	Huizhou (Boluo)	Town	208,739	251.62	
Gongzhuang	Huizhou (Boluo)	Town	46,813	299.5	
Baitang	Huizhou (Boluo)	Town	50,013	161.4	
Yangcun	Huizhou (Boluo)	Town	41,958	120	
Mabei	Huizhou (Boluo)	Town	21,690	58.6	
Shiba	Huizhou (Boluo)	Town	39,149	142	
Taimei	Huizhou (Boluo)	Town	34,169	183.5	
Longxi	Huizhou (Boluo)	Town	88,964	115.84	
Yuanzhou	Huizhou (Boluo)	Town	146,053	110	
Shiwan	Huizhou (Boluo)	Town	122,802	83	
Longhua	Huizhou (Boluo)	Town	26,009	62	
Futian	Huizhou (Boluo)	Town	38,286	86.7	
Changning	Huizhou (Boluo)	Town	39,983	117	
Huzhen	Huizhou (Boluo)	Town	56,551	117.3	
Yangqiao	Huizhou (Boluo)	Town	29,868	89	
Guanyinge	Huizhou (Boluo)	Town	17,309	143	
Henghe	Huizhou (Boluo)	Town	21,421	232.88	
Pinshan	Huizhou (Huidong)	Subdistrict	236,877	329.22	
Daling	Huizhou (Huidong)	Subdistrict	115,762	160.23	
Baihua	Huizhou (Huidong)	Town	63,904	203.61	
Lianghua	Huizhou (Huidong)	Town	44,122	177.7	
Renshan	Huizhou (Huidong)	Town	63,662	183.3	
Tieyon	Huizhou (Huidong)	Town	34,653	120	
Pinghai	Huizhou (Huidong)	Town	60,323	136	
Jilong	Huizhou (Huidong)	Town	78,773	99	
Huangbu	Huizhou (Huidong)	Town	83,756	97.7	
Duozhu	Huizhou (Huidong)	Town	63,039	408.96	
Andun	Huizhou (Huidong)	Town	36,297	369.5	
Gaotan	Huizhou (Huidong)	Town	7,399	193	
Baokou	Huizhou (Huidong)	Town	7,565	146.8	
Baipenzhu	Huizhou (Huidong)	Town	12,258	74	
Longcheng	Huizhou (Longmen)	Subdistrict	81,835	115.5	
Pingling	Huizhou (Longmen)	Subdistrict	36,533	143	
Mazha	Huizhou (Longmen)	Town	22,128	54.5	
Yonghan	Huizhou (Longmen)	Town	47,680	215	
Longtian	Huizhou (Longmen)	Town	17,810	195.5	
Longtan	Huizhou (Longmen)	Town	22,306	257	
Dipai	Huizhou (Longmen)	Town	13,991	211	
Longhua	Huizhou (Longmen)	Town	33,423	179	
Longjiang	Huizhou (Longmen)	Town	23,167	54.5	
Lantian	Huizhou (Longmen)	Township	7,716	169	
Chengdong	Zhaoqing (Duanzhou)	Subdistrict	212,718	17.8	
Chengxi	Zhaoqing (Duanzhou)	Subdistrict	114,837	10.3	
Chengbei (Note: Merged into Chengdong & Chengxi Subdistrict)	Zhaoqing (Duanzhou)	Subdistrict			
Chengnan (Note: Merged into Chengdong & Chengxi Subdistrict)	Zhaoqing (Duanzhou)	Subdistrict			
Huanggang	Zhaoqing (Duanzhou)	Subdistrict	88,272	78	
Mugang	Zhaoqing (Duanzhou)	Subdistrict	63,515	59.5	
Kengkou	Zhaoqing (Dinghu)	Subdistrict	22,406	95.5	
Guicheng	Zhaoqing (Dinghu)	Subdistrict	29,930	23.3	
Guangli Subdistrict	Zhaoqing (Dinghu)	Subdistrict	25,775	28	
Yong'an	Zhaoqing (Dinghu)	Town	29,732	80.5	
Shapu	Zhaoqing (Dinghu)	Town	15,598	105.8	
Fenghuang	Zhaoqing (Dinghu)	Town	9,110	145	
Lianhua	Zhaoqing (Dinghu)	Town	32,139	67	
Nan'an	Zhaoqing (Gaoyao)	Subdistrict	81,886	36.5	
Hetai	Zhaoqing (Gaoyao)	Town	33,660	150	
Lecheng	Zhaoqing (Gaoyao)	Town	24,337	94	
Shuinan	Zhaoqing (Gaoyao)	Town	11,598	126	
Lubu	Zhaoqing (Gaoyao)	Town	63,488	254	
Xiaoxiang	Zhaoqing (Gaoyao)	Town	30,964	200	
Dawan	Zhaoqing (Gaoyao)	Town	34,535	108	
Xinqiao	Zhaoqing (Gaoyao)	Town	39,265	41.8	
Baizhu	Zhaoqing (Gaoyao)	Town	36,977	128	
Liantang	Zhaoqing (Gaoyao)	Town	58,429	125	
Huodao	Zhaoqing (Gaoyao)	Town	41,358	228	
Jiaotang	Zhaoqing (Gaoyao)	Town	33,060	130	
Huilong	Zhaoqing (Gaoyao)	Town	25,426	124.25	
Baitu	Zhaoqing (Gaoyao)	Town	71,430	108.4	
Jindu	Zhaoqing (Gaoyao)	Town	43,623	101.23	
Jinli	Zhaoqing (Gaoyao)	Town	93,792	141.3	
Xiangang	Zhaoqing (Gaoyao)	Town	29,292	96.6	
Paisha	Zhaoqing (Guangning)	Town	20,527	154	
Tanpu	Zhaoqing (Guangning)	Town	20,844	132.6	
Jiangtun	Zhaoqing (Guangning)	Town	43,155	238.12	
Lianhe (Note: Merged into Jiangtun Town)	Zhaoqing (Guangning)	Town			
Luogang	Zhaoqing (Guangning)	Town	9,442	105	
Beishi	Zhaoqing (Guangning)	Town	16,458	230	
Kengkou	Zhaoqing (Guangning)	Town	21,002	181	
Chikeng	Zhaoqing (Guangning)	Town	12,596	181	
Nanjie	Zhaoqing (Guangning)	Town	118,259	189.3	
Binheng	Zhaoqing (Guangning)	Town	38,523	171.33	
Shijian (Note: Merged into Binheng Town)	Zhaoqing (Guangning)	Town			
Wuhe	Zhaoqing (Guangning)	Town	17,639	116.32	
Hengshan	Zhaoqing (Guangning)	Town	34,355	137.5	
Muge	Zhaoqing (Guangning)	Town	12,634	126.05	
Shiju	Zhaoqing (Guangning)	Town	9,272	83.56	
Gushui	Zhaoqing (Guangning)	Town	35,334	263.7	
Zhouzi	Zhaoqing (Guangning)	Town	13,901	88.53	
Huaicheng	Zhaoqing (Huaiji)	Town	146,839	262.02	
Zhagang	Zhaoqing (Huaiji)	Town	17,665	84.83	
Ao'zi	Zhaoqing (Huaiji)	Town	32,777	206.32	
Wenlang	Zhaoqing (Huaiji)	Town	16,542	86.16	
Gansa	Zhaoqing (Huaiji)	Town	17,429	132.21	
Fenggang	Zhaoqing (Huaiji)	Town	30,477	277	
Qiashui	Zhaoqing (Huaiji)	Town	28,193	529	
Liangcun	Zhaoqing (Huaiji)	Town	64,952	88.9	
Dagang	Zhaoqing (Huaiji)	Town	59,455	116	
Gangping	Zhaoqing (Huaiji)	Town	30,116	53.78	
Lengkeng	Zhaoqing (Huaiji)	Town	95,881	160.2	
Maning	Zhaoqing (Huaiji)	Town	38,913	58	
Langang	Zhaoqing (Huaiji)	Town	17,593	210	
Yonggu	Zhaoqing (Huaiji)	Town	36,709	189	
Shidong	Zhaoqing (Huaiji)	Town	54,347	325	
Qiaotou	Zhaoqing (Huaiji)	Town	44,647	213	
Zhongzhou	Zhaoqing (Huaiji)	Town	77.1140,524	200.4	
Lianmai	Zhaoqing (Huaiji)	Town	32,394	119	
Shuai	Zhaoqing (Huaiji)	Township	7,579	77.11	
Jiangkou	Zhaoqing (Fengkai)	Town	65,160	177	
Jiangchuan	Zhaoqing (Fengkai)	Town	8,286	120.08	
Baigou	Zhaoqing (Fengkai)	Town	12,125	142.3	
Dazhou	Zhaoqing (Fengkai)	Town	12,514	161.84	
Yulao	Zhaoqing (Fengkai)	Town	18,187	118	
He'erkou	Zhaoqing (Fengkai)	Town	21,483	368	
Liandu	Zhaoqing (Fengkai)	Town	24,838	256	
Xinghua	Zhaoqing (Fengkai)	Town	23,277	156.3	
Luodong	Zhaoqing (Fengkai)	Town	21,205	136.83	
Changgang	Zhaoqing (Fengkai)	Town	20,497	152.64	
Pingfeng	Zhaoqing (Fengkai)	Town	16,901	107.67	
Nanfeng	Zhaoqing (Fengkai)	Town	71,479	306	
Dayukou	Zhaoqing (Fengkai)	Town	11,279	129	
Duping	Zhaoqing (Fengkai)	Town	8,913	130.54	
Jinzhuang	Zhaoqing (Fengkai)	Town	27,247	127.08	
Chang'an	Zhaoqing (Fengkai)	Town	34,867	139.04	
Decheng	Zhaoqing (Deqing)	Subdistrict	58,878	17.5	
Xinxu	Zhaoqing (Deqing)	Town	23,892	138	
Huilong	Zhaoqing (Deqing)	Town	17,401	132.2	
Guanxu	Zhaoqing (Deqing)	Town	30,379	292	
Maxu	Zhaoqing (Deqing)	Town	20,214	163.75	
Gaoliang	Zhaoqing (Deqing)	Town	28,944	300	
Mocun	Zhaoqing (Deqing)	Town	28,625	300	
Yongfeng	Zhaoqing (Deqing)	Town	19,924	160	
Wulong	Zhaoqing (Deqing)	Town	14,207	136	
Bozhi	Zhaoqing (Deqing)	Town	15,308	115.3	
Fengcun	Zhaoqing (Deqing)	Town	27,344	160	
Yuecheng	Zhaoqing (Deqing)	Town	31,544	221	
Jiushi	Zhaoqing (Deqing)	Town	24,551	152.6	
Dongcheng	Zhaoqing (Sihui)	Subdistrict	101,428	46	
Chengzhong	Zhaoqing (Sihui)	Subdistrict	142,577	84	
Zhenshan	Zhaoqing (Sihui)	Subdistrict	35,922	100.68	
Longfu	Zhaoqing (Sihui)	Town	17,979	103	
Dedou	Zhaoqing (Sihui)	Town	18,351	89.7	
Weizheng	Zhaoqing (Sihui)	Town	12,047	63.9	
Luoyuan	Zhaoqing (Sihui)	Town	5,945	26	
Jingkou	Zhaoqing (Sihui)	Town	12,669	101	
Dasha	Zhaoqing (Sihui)	Town	46,120	80	
Shigou	Zhaoqing (Sihui)	Town	16,170	142	
Huangtian	Zhaoqing (Sihui)	Town	10,743	89.6	
Jianggu	Zhaoqing (Sihui)	Town	27,177	82.4	
Xiamao	Zhaoqing (Sihui)	Town	24,579	107.5	
Central and Western	Hong Kong	District	251,519	12.4	20,102
Eastern	Hong Kong	District	588,094	18.5	31,664
Southern	Hong Kong	District	278,655	38.8	7,083
Wan Chai	Hong Kong	District	152,608	9.8	15,788
Sham Shui Po	Hong Kong	District	380,855	9.3	39,095
Kowloon City	Hong Kong	District	377,351	10.0	36,178
Kwun Tong	Hong Kong	District	622,152	11.2	52,123
Wong Tai Sin	Hong Kong	District	420,183	9.3	45,540
Yau Tsim Mong	Hong Kong	District	307,878	6.9	40,136
Kwai Tsing	Hong Kong	District	511,167	23.3	22,421
North	Hong Kong	District	304,134	136.6	2,055
Sai Kung	Hong Kong	District	436,627	129.6	3,135
Sha Tin	Hong Kong	District	630,273	68.7	8,842
Tai Po	Hong Kong	District	296,853	136.1	2,156
Tsuen Wan	Hong Kong	District	304,637	61.7	4,679
Tuen Mun	Hong Kong	District	487,546	82.8	6,057
Yuen Long	Hong Kong	District	578,529	138.4	3,858
Islands	Hong Kong	District	141,327	175.1	783
Nossa Senhora de Fátima	Macau	Freguesia	211,800	3.2	66,187
Santo António	Macau	Freguesia	120,600	1.1	109,636
São Lázaro	Macau	Freguesia	31,900	0.6	53,166
Sé	Macau	Freguesia	46,100	3.4	13,558
São Lourenço	Macau	Freguesia	47,200	1.0	47,200
Nossa Senhora do Carmo	Macau	Freguesia	78,000	7.6	10,263
São Francisco Xavier	Macau	Freguesia	4,000	7.6	526
Cotai	Macau	Freguesia	n/a	5.8	n/a

== Pearl River mega-city ==
A 2011 article in British newspaper The Telegraph reported on a "Turn The Pearl River Delta Into One" project. The stated goal was to "mesh the transport, energy, water and telecommunications networks of the nine cities together." (Hong Kong and Macau were not included.) However, the Chinese government denied that such a project existed.

== Pollution ==
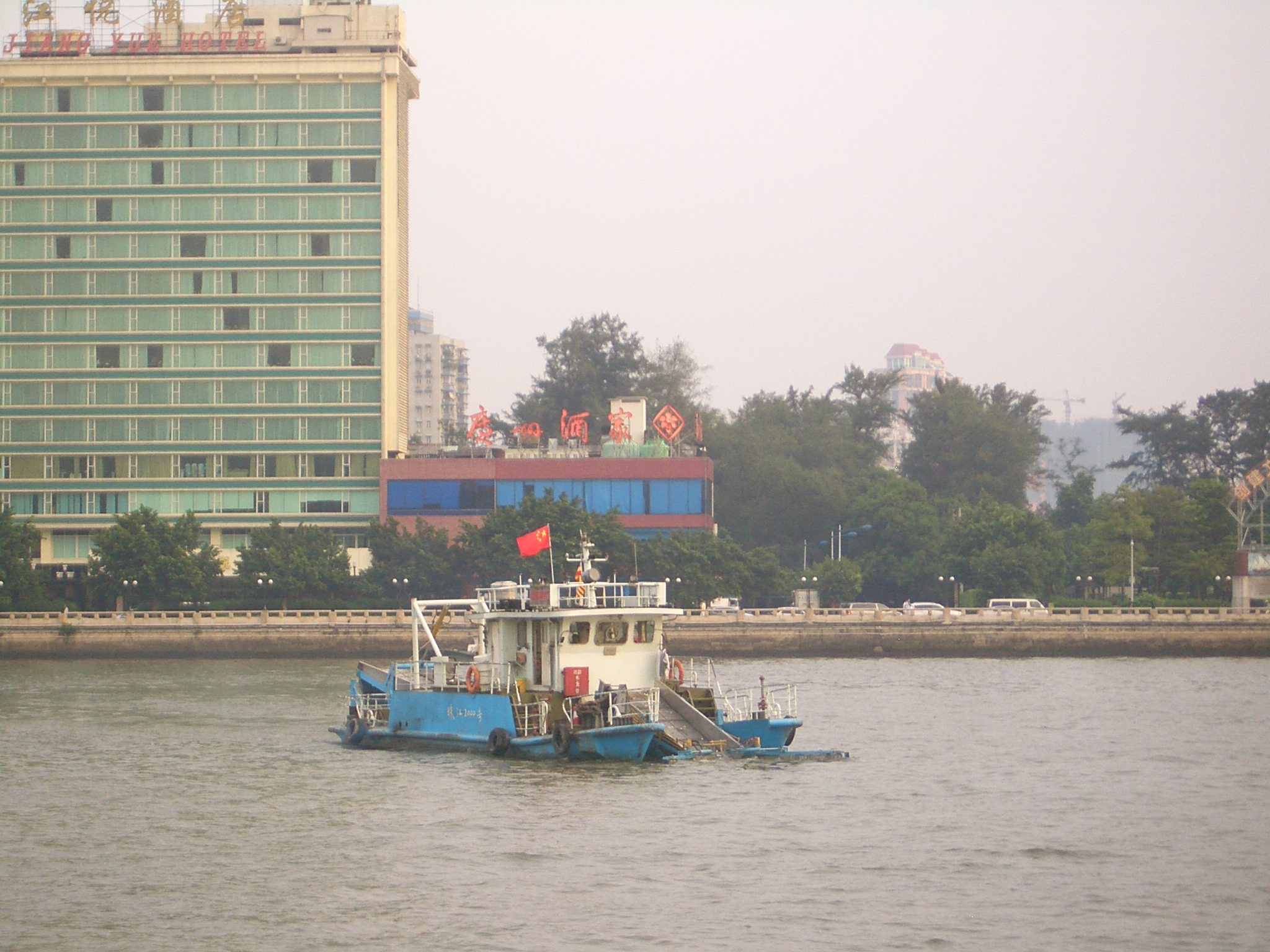
Removal of floating trash from the surface of the Pearl River in Guangzhou

The Pearl River Delta is notoriously polluted. After thirty years of rapid industrialization, the Pearl River Delta has in parts been famed for pollution. Acid rain, smog, water pollution, and electronic waste contribute to the perceived problems. In travel literature the Pearl River Delta has been titillated as among the most attractive "pollution day trips from Hong Kong".

Treatment facilities for sewage and industrial waste are failing to keep pace with the growth in population and industry in the area. A large portion of the pollution is brought about by factories run by Hong Kong manufacturers in the area. Much of the area is frequently covered with a brown smog. This has a strong effect on the pollution levels in the delta.

On 22 March 2007 the World Bank approved a $96 million loan to the PRC government to reduce water pollution in the Pearl River Delta. On December 23, 2008, it was announced that ¥48.6 billion (about $7.1 billion) will be spent on the river by mid-2010 to clean up the river's sewage problems quoted by Zhang Hu, the director of Guangzhou municipal bureau of water affairs. The city will build about 30 water treatment plants, which will treat 2.25 million tonnes of water per day. The program hopes to cut down the amount of sewage in the area by 85%, and was also of fundamental importance for the 2010 Asian Games held in Guangzhou from November 12, 2010, to November 27, 2010.

In October 2009 Greenpeace East Asia released a report, "Poisoning the Pearl River" that detailed the results of a study it conducted in which 25 samples were collected from five manufacturing facilities in the Greater Pearl River Delta. The study concluded that all the facilities sampled were discharging waste-water containing chemicals with proven or suspected hazardous properties including beryllium, copper, manganese, and heavy metals, as well as high levels of organic chemicals. These substances are associated with a long list of health problems such as cancer, endocrine disruption, renal failure and damage to the nervous system as well being known to harm the environment. Three of the five facilities sampled (Qingyuan Top Dragon Co. Ltd, Wing Fung P.C. Board Co. Ltd. and Techwise Qingyuan Circuit Co. Ltd.) contained concentrations of chemicals which exceeded the limits set by Guangdong provincial effluent standards. These companies were then subjected to a Clean Production Audit according to Article 28 of China's Cleaner Production Promotion Law. Guangdong Environmental Protection Bureau took a stance against the companies by blacklisting them.

Pearl River Delta is a strong source of greenhouse gases as well. Although it is hard to estimate overall greenhouse gas emissions from such a large megacity, scientists have shown that Pearl River Delta exhibits one of the strongest anomalies in carbon dioxide concentration around the world. This enhancement is easily discernible from satellite observations.

== See also ==
- Guangdong–Hong Kong–Macao Greater Bay Area
- Bocca Tigris
- Metropolitan regions of China
- Yangtze River Delta
- Yellow River Delta and Bohai Sea
- National Central City
- Huangpu Bridge
- Humen Pearl River Bridge
- Hong Kong-Zhuhai-Macau Bridge
- Shenzhen-Zhongshan Bridge
