= Wuguishan Subdistrict =

Coordinates: 22.5156°N 113.3924°E

Wuguishan 五桂山街道
- Subdistrict
- Wuguishan Subdistrict is labelled '6' on this map of Zhongshan
- Country: People's Republic of China
- Province: Guangdong
- Prefecture-level city: Zhongshan

Population (2020)
  - Total: 46,049
- Time zone: UTC+8 (China Standard)

Wuguishan Subdistrict (Chinese: 五桂山; pinyin: Wǔguìshān; Jyutping: ng^{5}gwai^{3}saan^{1}) is a subdistrict of the prefecture-level city of Zhongshan, Guangdong province, China. At the 2020 census, it had a population of 46,049.

== Name ==
It derives its name from "Wugui Mountain" (Chinese: 五桂山; pinyin: Wǔguìshān) in the district, which literally means "five osmanthus mountain" in English. The name of Xiangshan County, Zhongshan's old name, also derives from the mountain.

== Geography ==
Situated in the southern part of Zhongshan, it borders with East District, South District, Sanxiang, Nanlang, Banfu of Zhongshan and Xiangzhou District of Zhuhai. It covers an area of 113 square kilometres (44 sq mi).
