= Hengli =

Hengli may refer to:

- Hengli, Guangzhou (横沥镇), a town in Panyu District, Guangzhou, now abolished.
- Hengli, Dongguan (横沥镇), a town in Dongguan
- Hengli Group (恒力集团), a textile and petrochemical company
- Henglicai (恒丽彩 丹灶镇), an Aluminium Composite Panel company in Foshan
