= Dalingshan =

Dalingshan 大岭山镇
- Town
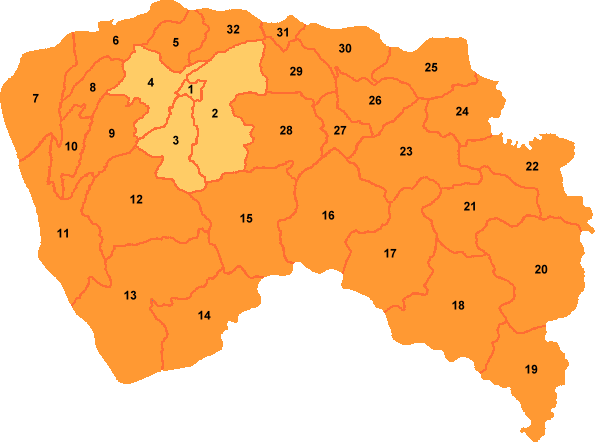
- Dalingshan is labelled '15' on this map of Dongguan

- Location within Guangdong
- Coordinates: 22°54′00″N 113°50′32″E
- Country: People's Republic of China
- Province: Guangdong
- Prefecture-level city: Dongguan
- Time zone: UTC+8 (China Standard)

Dalingshan (simplified Chinese: 大岭山; traditional Chinese: 大嶺山; pinyin: Dàlǐngshān) is a town under the jurisdiction of Dongguan prefecture-level city in the Pearl River Delta region of Guangdong province, China. Songshan Lake Hi-Tech Industrial Development Zone (often known as "SSL" or the “Zone”) is situated in the hinterland of the Guangdong-Hong Kong-Macao Greater Bay Area (GBA).

== Demographics ==
Dalingshan town (大岭山镇) covers 110km^{2} with 279,414 residents in 2010.

== History ==
During the Second World War, the town and mountainous forest park served as the base for guerrilla resistance against the Japanese occupation. Dalingshan town is home to the Museum of the War of Chinese People's Resistance Against Japanese Aggression (simplified Chinese: 中国人民抗日战争纪念馆; traditional Chinese: 中國人民抗日戰爭紀念館; pinyin: Zhōngguó Rénmín Kàngrì Zhànzhēng Jìniànguǎn). It is located in Dawangling Village. It is not to be confused with a museum of the same name in Beijing.

== Transportation ==
=== Rail ===
Dalingshan will host three Dongguan Rail Transit stations under the current plans for construction of Line 1:

1. Dalingshanbei (Dalingshan North)
2. Dalingshan
3. Dalingshandong (Dalingshan East)

A tram service has been under planning in recent years.

=== Road ===
Many roads pass the southern and northern limits of the town. The G107 highway runs through the town.

=== Air ===
It is possible to travel by coach to Shenzhen Airport and Guangzhou Airport.

== Education ==
Dalingshan is part of the Songshan Lake region. Guangdong Medical University (GDMU), and Dongguan University of Technology (DGUT) and other education institutions are located in and around Keyuan Road. There is also the Dongguan Career Technical College within the area.

Dongguan University of Technology (DGUT; 东莞理工学院) is a college and university located nearby the Huawei European town.

The Dongguan campus of Guangdong Medical University (GDMU), which admitted its first students in 2003, is located in the scenic Songshan Lake Science and Technology and Industry Park in southern Dongguan.

Tungwah Wenzel International School (TWIS) became the first International Baccalaureate (IB) continuum school in Dongguan in December 2021. It now offers PYP (Primary Year Programme), Middle Year Programme (MYP) and Diploma Programme (authorized on October 25, 2021) education. The school is located at: No. 17 Keyuan Road, Songshan Lake High-Tech Industrial Zone, Dongguan, Guangdong, China.

There are 300 thousand books in Songshan Lake library.

== Sports and culture ==
Dalingshan Sports Park is located centrally by Jinjuling.

Dalingshan Forest Park (大岭山森林公园) is to the town's west. The mountain of Dalingshan overlooks the town. It can be seen from Houjie town and other surrounding towns. The park has entrances at Humen, Houjie, and several parts of Dalingshan town. There are many hiking trails and temples within the park. Maitreya (future Buddha) can be found inside the park alongside temples and the tree-lined Huaihu Reservoir. Views of the Humen Pearl River Bridge can be seen from the southwest corner of the park.

== Economy ==
The high tech commerce park in the Songshan Lake district (opened in 2003).

== Social issues ==
Songshan Lake Hospital is affiliated to Zhongshan University and located within a short distance of both university sites.
