= Qiaotou, Dongguan =

Qiaotou 桥头镇
- Town
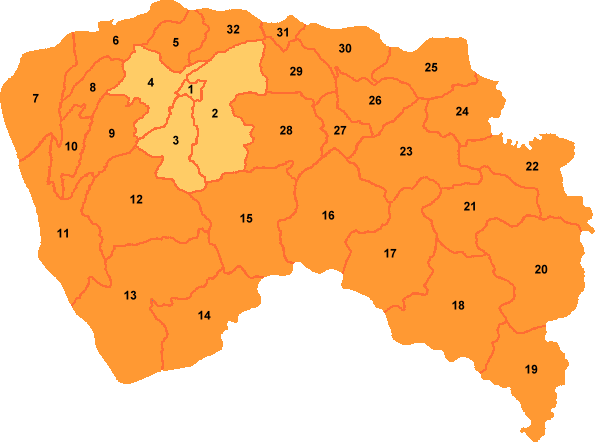
- Qiaotou is labeled '24' on this map of Dongguan

- Location in Guangdong
- Coordinates (Qiaotou government): 23°01′27″N 114°06′17″E
- Country: People's Republic of China
- Province: Guangdong
- Prefecture-level city: Dongguan
- Time zone: UTC+8 (China Standard)

Qiaotou (simplified Chinese: 桥头镇; traditional Chinese: 橋頭鎮; pinyin: Qiáotóu zhèn; Jyutping: kiu^{4}tau^{4} zan^{3}) is a town under the jurisdiction of the prefecture-level city of Dongguan in the Pearl River Delta region of Guangdong province, China. It is located at the eastern periphery of Dongguan. It stands on the S6 Guanglong Expressway (廣龍高速公路). The town is on the Dong River (東江), the eastern tributary of the Pearl River (珠江) in Guangdong province. It has a population of 207,900.
