= Zhongtang, Guangdong =

Zhongtang 中堂镇
- Town
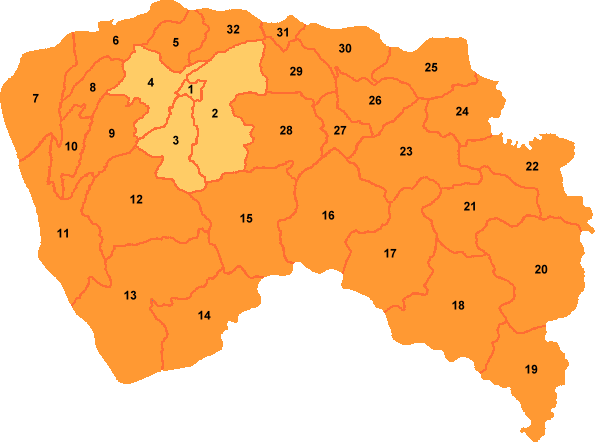
- Zhongtang is labelled '6' on this map of Dongguan

- Location within Guangdong
- Coordinates: 23°05′33″N 113°39′26″E
- Country: People's Republic of China
- Province: Guangdong
- Prefecture-level city: Dongguan
- Time zone: UTC+8 (China Standard)

Zhongtang (Chinese: 中堂; pinyin: Zhōngtáng) is a town under the direct jurisdiction of the prefecture-level city of Dongguan in the Pearl River Delta region of Guangdong Province, China.

As of 2018, it has five residential communities and 15 villages under its administration.
