= Dongkeng =

Dongkeng 东坑镇
- Town
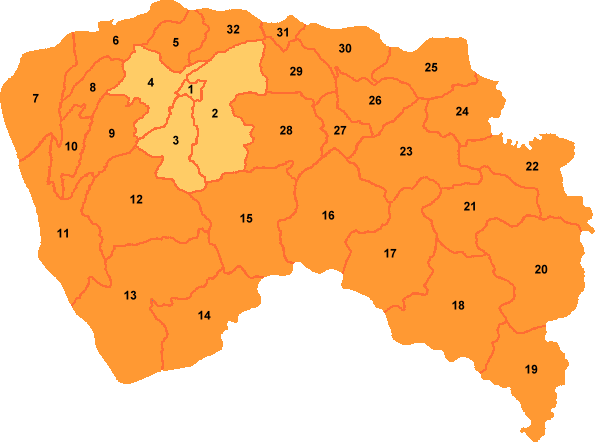
- Dongkeng is labeled '27' on this map of Dongguan

- Location within Guangdong
- Coordinates: 22°59′45″N 113°56′02″E
- Country: People's Republic of China
- Province: Guangdong
- Prefecture-level city: Dongguan
- Time zone: UTC+8 (China Standard)

Dongkeng (simplified Chinese: 东坑镇; traditional Chinese: 東坑鎮; pinyin: Dōngkēng zhèn) is a town under the jurisdiction of Dongguan prefecture-level city in the Pearl River Delta region of Guangdong province, China; it is located to the east of Dongguan's urban core.
