= Shatian, Dongguan =

Shatian 沙田镇
- Town
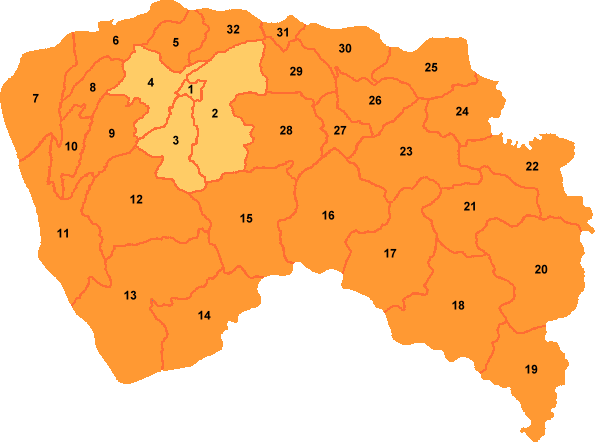
- Shatian is labeled '11' on this map of Dongguan

- Location in Guangdong
- Coordinates: 22°55′11″N 113°37′06″E
- Country: China
- Province: Guangdong
- Prefecture-level city: Dongguan

Population (2020)
  - Total: 210,200
- Time zone: UTC+8 (China Standard)

Shatian (Chinese: 沙田; pinyin: Shātián) is a town under the jurisdiction of the prefecture-level city of Dongguan in Guangdong province, China.
