= Sanjiao, Zhongshan =

Sanjiao 三角镇
- Town
- Sanjiao is labelled "20" on this map of Zhongshan

- Location within Guangdong
- Coordinates: 22°40′37″N 113°25′06″E
- Country: People's Republic of China
- Province: Guangdong
- Prefecture-level city: Zhongshan

Population (2020)
  - Total: 126,294
- Time zone: UTC+8 (China Standard)

Sanjiao (Chinese: 三角镇; pinyin: Sānjiǎo zhèn; Jyutping: saam^{1}gok^{3} zan^{3}) is a town at the northeast of Zhongshan, Guangdong province, China. It is adjacent to Guangzhou and Panyu on the north. It covers an area of 70.32 km^{2} (27.15 sq mi) and has a permanent population of 56,000 and migrant population of 60,000.
