= Hengli, Dongguan =

Hengli 横沥镇
- Town
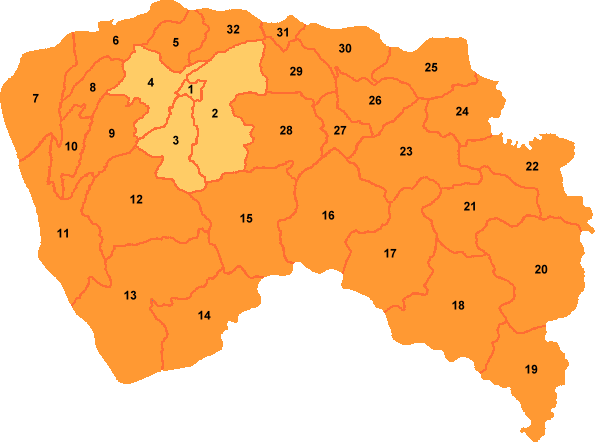
- Hengli is labeled '26' on this map of Dongguan

- Location within Guangdong Location within China
- Coordinates: 23°01′07″N 113°57′57″E
- Country: China
- Province: Guangdong
- Prefecture-level city: Dongguan
- Village-level Divisions: 2 communities 16 villages

Area
  - Total: 47.75 km^{2} (18.44 sq mi)
- Elevation: 8 m (26 ft)

Population (2020)
  - Total: 278,858
  - Density: 5,840/km^{2} (15,130/sq mi)
- Time zone: UTC+8 (CST)
- Postal code: 523460

Hengli (simplified Chinese: 横沥镇; traditional Chinese: 橫瀝鎮; pinyin: Hénglì zhèn) is a town under the jurisdiction of Dongguan prefecture-level city in the Pearl River Delta region of Guangdong province, China. It is located just north of Changping Town. As of the year 2020, it had a total population of 278,858.

== Geography ==
Hengli Town is located on the banks of Huanbao and Yinhe Rivers. The Congguanshen Expressway crosses the eastern part of the town. It has an average elevation of 8 meters above the sea level.

== Climate ==
Hengli Town has a Humid Subtropical Climate (Cfa). It sees the most rainfall in June, with an average precipitation of 259.8 mm; and the least rainfall in December, with an average precipitation of 25.8 mm.

Climate data for Hengli
Month	Jan	Feb	Mar	Apr	May	Jun	Jul	Aug	Sep	Oct	Nov	Dec	Year
Mean daily maximum °C (°F)	19 (66)	20 (68)	23 (73)	27 (81)	30 (86)	31 (88)	32 (90)	32 (90)	32 (90)	29 (84)	26 (79)	21 (70)	27 (80)
Daily mean °C (°F)	14 (57)	16 (61)	19 (66)	23 (73)	26 (79)	28 (82)	29 (84)	29 (84)	28 (82)	25 (77)	21 (70)	16 (61)	23 (73)
Mean daily minimum °C (°F)	10 (50)	12 (54)	16 (61)	20 (68)	24 (75)	26 (79)	26 (79)	26 (79)	24 (75)	21 (70)	16 (61)	12 (54)	19 (67)
Average rainfall mm (inches)	31.1 (1.22)	45.3 (1.78)	80.8 (3.18)	156.9 (6.18)	229.2 (9.02)	259.8 (10.23)	212.6 (8.37)	206.2 (8.12)	131.0 (5.16)	49.0 (1.93)	29.6 (1.17)	25.8 (1.02)	1,457.3 (57.38)
Average rainy days (≥ 1 mm)	3.3	5.1	7.6	11.8	16.0	17.0	15.9	15.7	10.5	4.7	3.3	2.6	113.5
Mean daily daylight hours	10.9	11.4	12.0	12.7	13.3	13.5	13.4	12.9	12.3	11.6	11.0	10.7	12.1
Source: Weatherspark.com

== Administrative divisions ==
In the year 2022, Hengli Town consisted of 18 subdivisions, including the following 2 residential communities and 16 villages:

=== Residential communities ===
- Hengquan (恒泉)
- Yuning (裕宁)

=== Villages ===
- Shiyong (石涌)
- Gekeng (隔坑)
- Banxianshan (半仙山)
- Hengli (横沥)
- Tiantou (田头)
- Tiankeng (田坑)
- Cuntou (村头)
- Changxiang (长巷)
- Tianraobu (田饶步)
- Liujia (六甲)
- Cunwei (村尾)
- Shuibian (水边)
- Xinsi (新四)
- Shansha (山厦)
- Yuetan (月塘)
- Zhangkeng (张坑)
