= Zhongshan Torch Hi-tech Industrial Development Zone =

Zhongshan Torch Hi-tech Industrial Development Zone 中山火炬高技术产业开发区 Zhongshangang Subdistrict
- Subdistrict
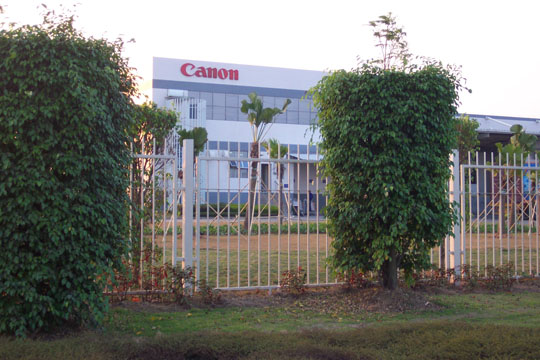
- Canon's Zhongshan Branch in Zhongshan Torch Hi-tech Industrial Development Zone

- Zhongshangang Subdistrict is labelled "5" on this map of Zhongshan
- Country: People's Republic of China
- Province: Guangdong
- Prefecture-level city: Zhongshan

Population (2020)
  - Total: 289,518
- Time zone: UTC+8 (China Standard)

Zhongshan Torch Hi-tech Industrial Development Zone
- Simplified Chinese: 中山火炬高技术产业开发区
- Traditional Chinese: 中山火炬高技術產業開發區
Transcriptions
Standard Mandarin
- Hanyu Pinyin: Zhōngshān Huǒjù gāojìshù chǎnyè kāifāqū
Yue: Cantonese
- Jyutping: zung^{1}saan^{1} fo^{2}geoi^{6} gou^{1}gei^{6}seot^{6} caan^{2}jip^{6} hoi^{1}faat^{3}keoi^{1}

Zhongshangang Subdistrict
- Chinese: 中山港街道
Transcriptions
Standard Mandarin
- Hanyu Pinyin: Zhōngshāngǎng jiēdào
Yue: Cantonese
- Jyutping: zung^{1}saan^{1}gong^{2} gaai^{1}dou^{6}

Zhongshan Torch Hi-tech Industrial Development Zone (Chinese: 火炬高技术产业开发区) also known as Zhongshangang Subdistrict (Chinese: 中山港街道) or Zhangjiabian Subdistrict (Chinese: 张家边街道), is a national-level hi-tech industrial development zone in Zhongshan, Guangdong, China. Formerly the three subdistricts: THIDZ, Zhongshangang and Zhangjiabian were three separate subdistricts until they were merged in January 1993. The zone lies in the east of Zhongshan, with an area of 90 km^{2} (35 sq mi). At the 2020 census, it has a population of 289,518.

It was jointly established by the Ministry of Science and Technology, Guangdong Provincial Government and Zhongshan Municipal Government in 1990. Several national-level enterprises have established industrial bases in the zone.
