= Shijie, Guangdong =

Shijie 石碣镇
- Town
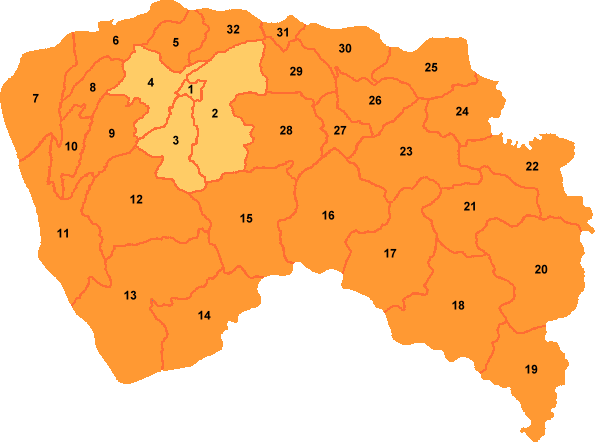
- Shijie is labeled '32' on this map of Dongguan

- Location within Guangdong
- Coordinates: 23°05′59″N 113°48′47″E
- Country: People's Republic of China
- Province: Guangdong
- Prefecture-level city: Dongguan
- Time zone: UTC+8 (China Standard)

Shijie (Chinese: 石碣; pinyin: Shíjié) is a town under the jurisdiction of Dongguan prefecture-level city in Guangdong province, China, located to the north/northeast of downtown.
