= Shipai, Dongguan =

Shipai 石排镇
- Town
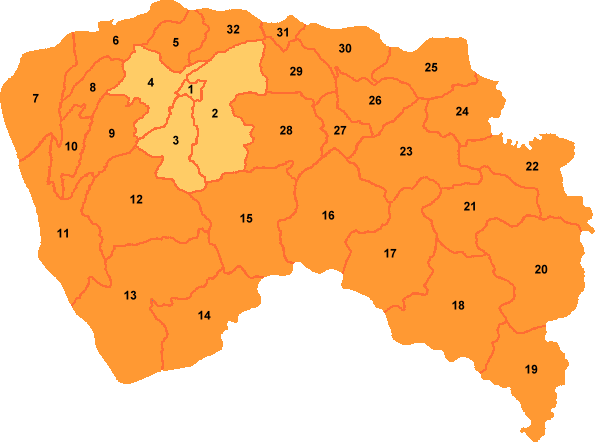
- Shipai is labelled '30' on this map of Dongguan

- Location in Guangdong
- Coordinates: 23°05′25″N 113°56′25″E
- Country: People's Republic of China
- Province: Guangdong
- Prefecture-level city: Dongguan
- Time zone: UTC+8 (China Standard)

Shipai (Chinese: 石排; pinyin: Shípái) is a town under the jurisdiction of the prefecture-level city of Dongguan in Guangdong province, China.
