= Qishi, Dongguan =

Qishi 企石镇
- Town
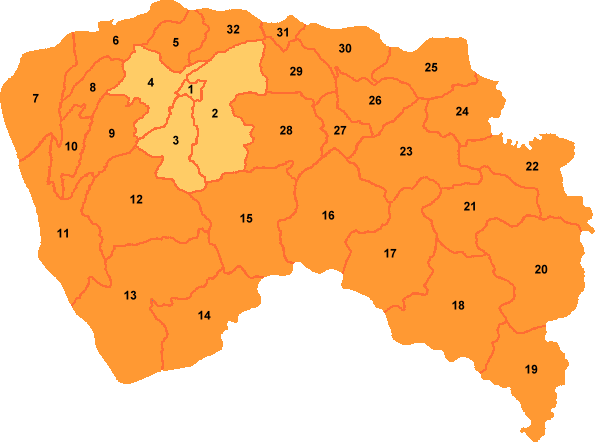
- Qishi is labeled '25' on this map of Dongguan
- Coordinates: 23°04′22″N 114°01′19″E
- Country: People's Republic of China
- Province: Guangdong
- Prefecture-level city: Dongguan
- Time zone: UTC+8 (China Standard)

Qishi (Chinese: 企石; pinyin: Qǐshí) is a town under the jurisdiction of Dongguan prefecture-level city in Guangdong province, China. Its population was last estimated at 78,000 in 51 km^{2} (20 sq mi).

== Economy ==
The economy of Qishi has experienced significant growth, characterized by the establishment of numerous new factories within the town. Qishi's economic landscape is diverse, with key industries such as electronics, computers, hardware, printing, stationery, and furniture driving its economic activity. The town's GDP stands at approximately 2.67 billion RMB, reflecting its industrial profile.

Noteworthy developments include the presence of a government-certified 5-star hotel.
