= Macao Dragon Company =

Macao Dragon Company Limited Dragão Gigante Transportes Marítimos, S.A.
- Native name: 巨龍船務有限公司
- Company type: Private company
- Industry: Ferry
- Founded: 2008; 18 years ago
- Headquarters: Hong Kong, Hong Kong
- Website: http://www.macaodragon.com

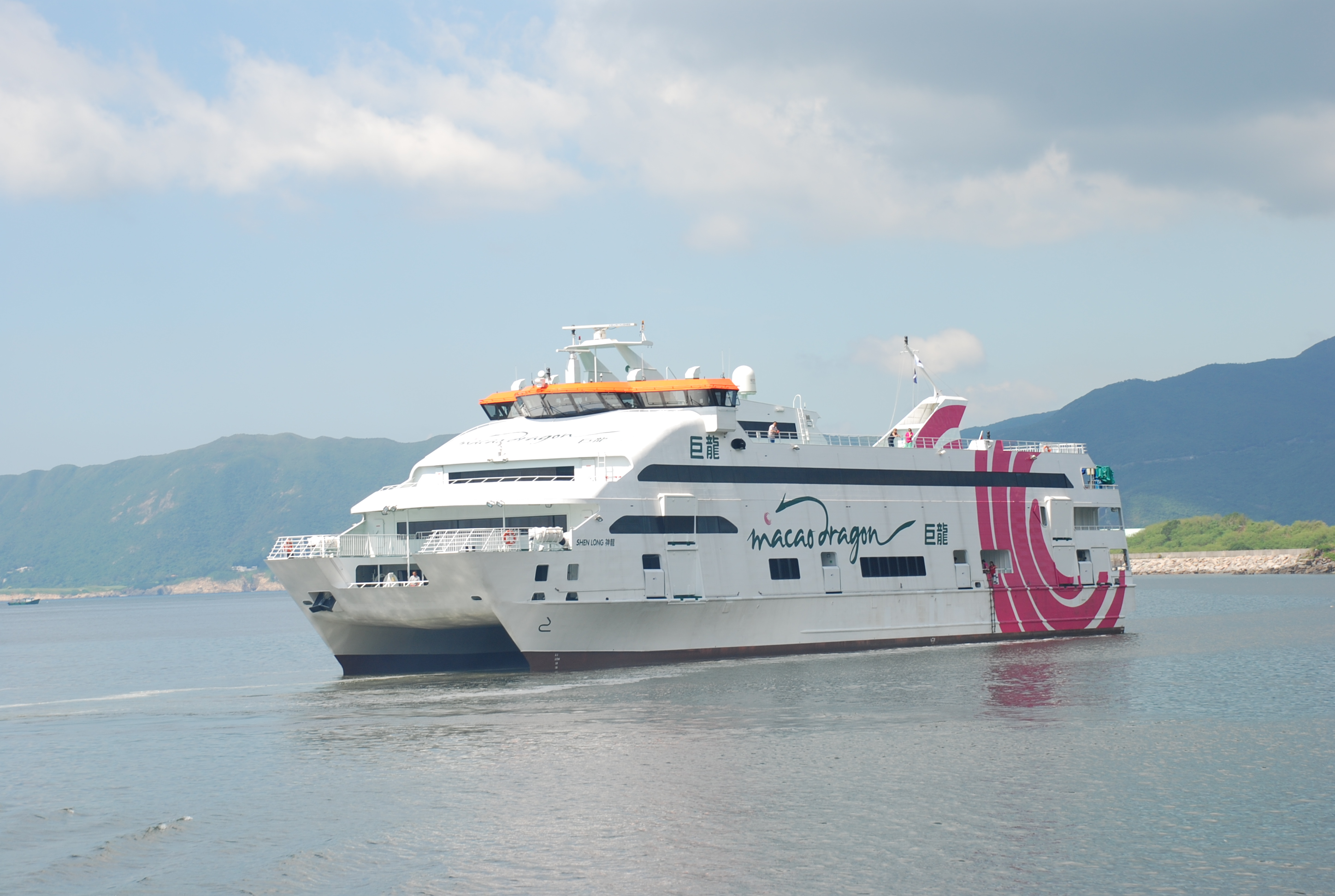
Shen Long - Highspeed Catamaran

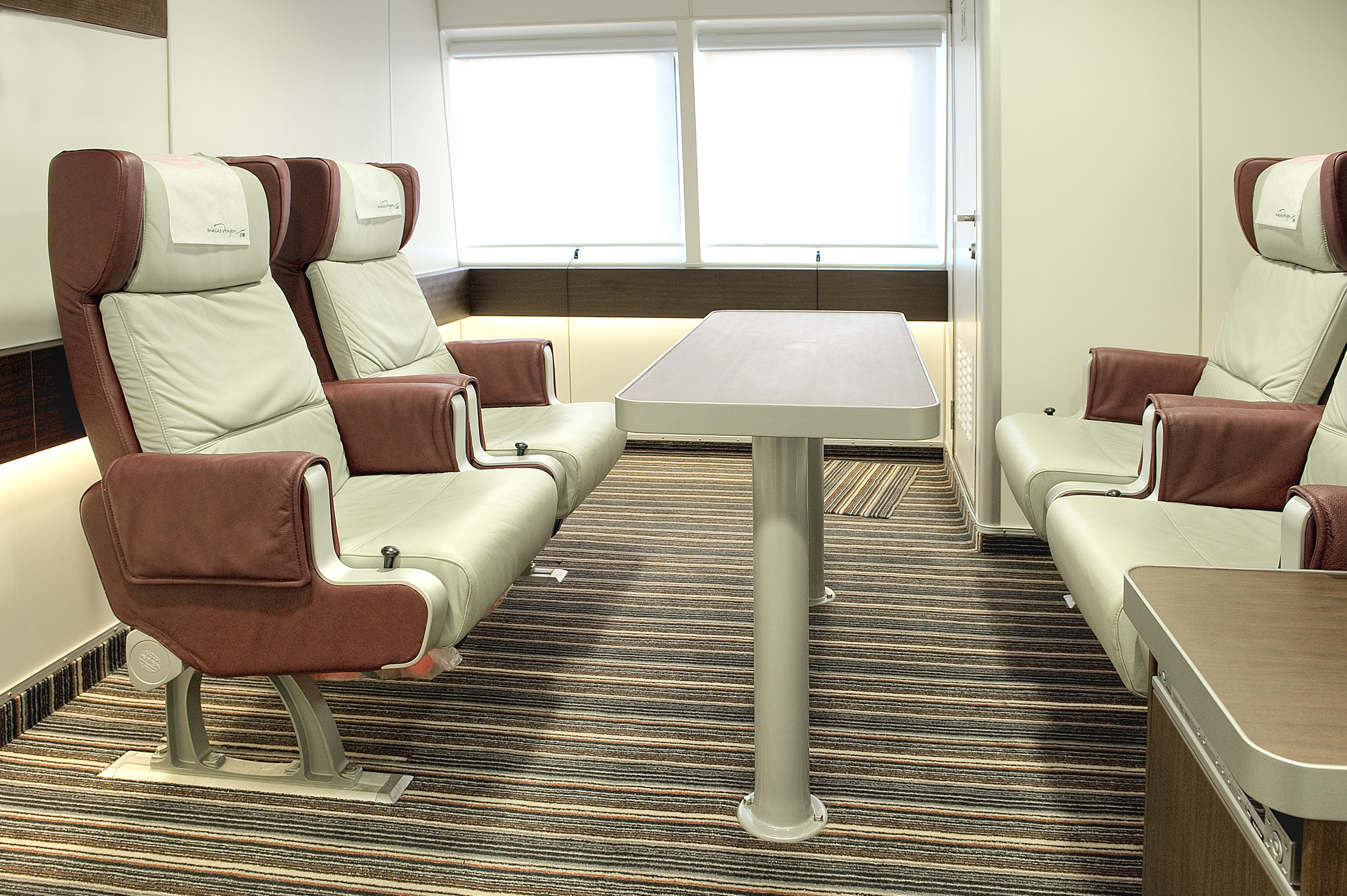
Shen Long - Dragon Suite

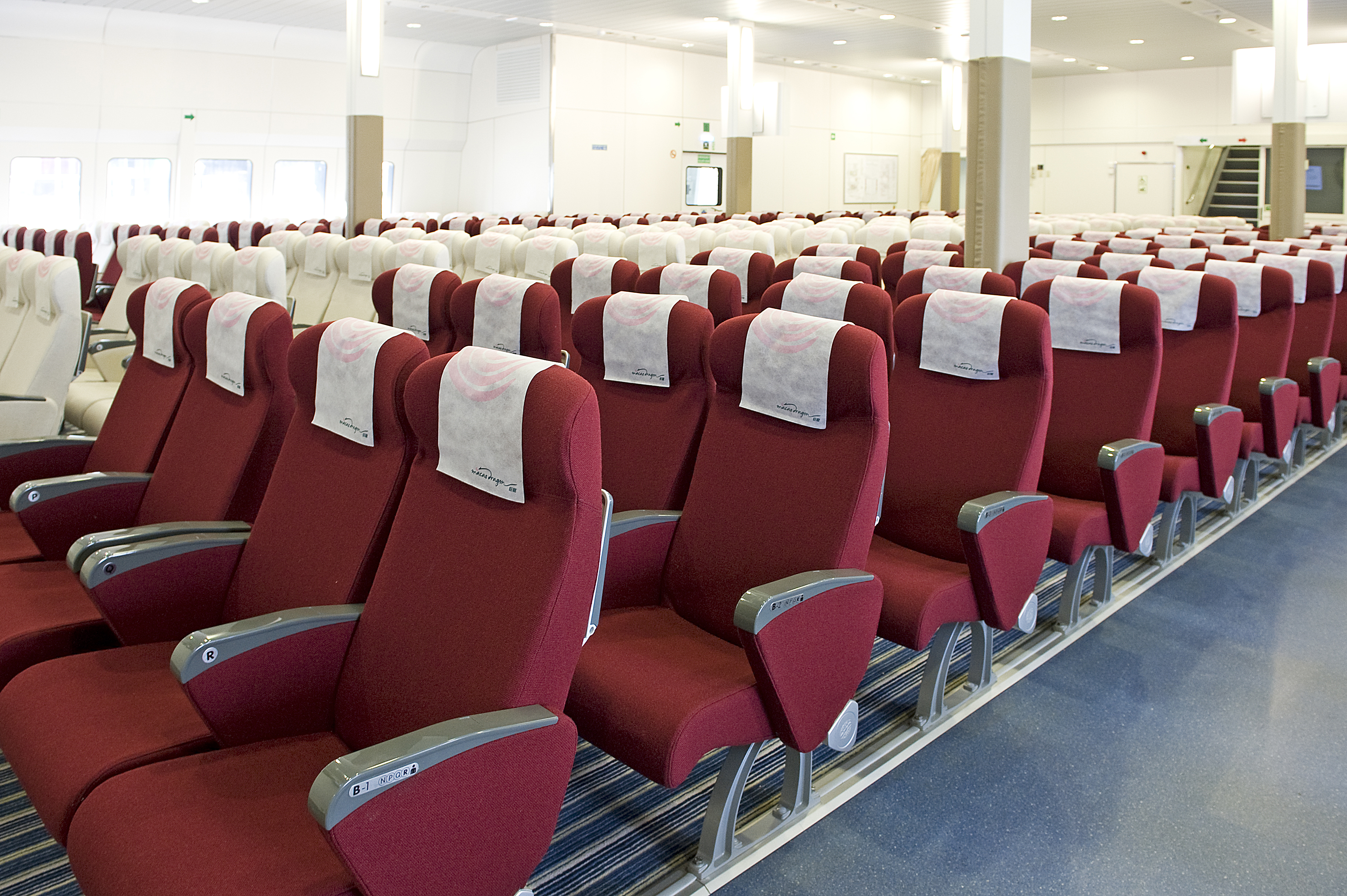
Shen Long - Economy Cabin

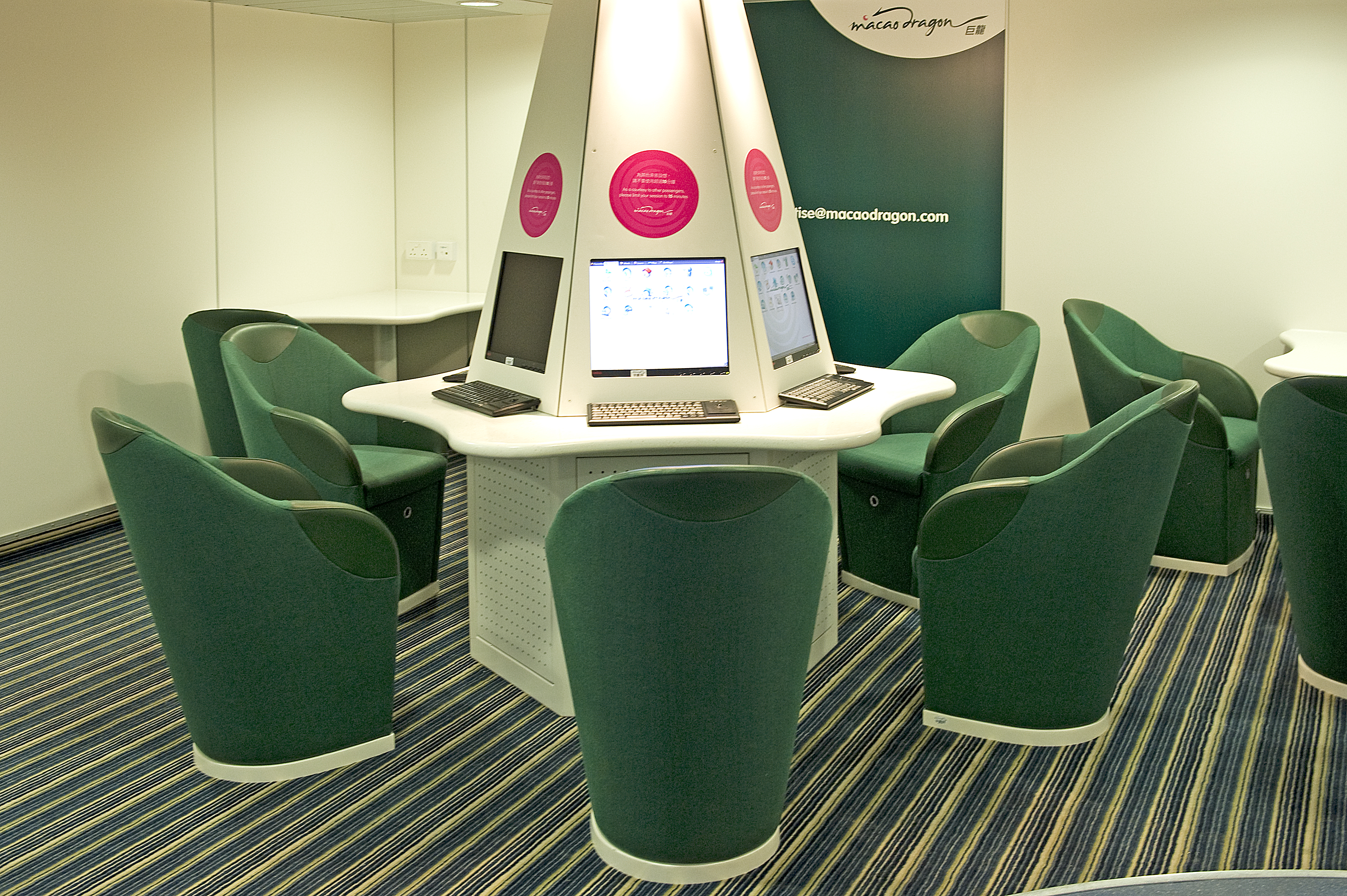
Shen Long - On board Internet café

Macao Dragon Company Limited (Chinese: 巨龍船務有限公司; Portuguese: Dragão Gigante Transportes Marítimos, S.A.) was a start-up ferry company that offered services between the Hong Kong–Macau Ferry Terminal, in Sheung Wan, Hong Kong, and the Taipa Temporary Ferry Terminal in Taipa, Macau. It operated four 65m and 63m highspeed catamarans vessels powered by MTU Friedrichshafen engines using waterjet propulsion, which could accommodate up to 1,200 passengers.

== History ==
Operations of the company began on July 10, 2010. As of September 2010, the first two vessels, Shen Long and Tian Long had entered service, providing five return trips between Macau and Hong Kong.

The Macao Dragon company went into liquidation and ceased operations from September 15, 2011.

== Routes ==
- Hong Kong–Macau Ferry Terminal, Hong Kong ↔ Taipa Temporary Ferry Terminal, Macau

== Fleet ==
The Macao Dragon fleet consisted of the following vessels:

- Shen Long (Chinese: 神龍), (Hull 189) 65m Highspeed Catamaran built by Marinteknik Shipbuilders(Singapore) - (delivered)
- Tian Long (Chinese: 天龍), (Hull 190) 65m Highspeed Catamaran built by Marinteknik Shipbuilders (Singapore) - (delivered)
- Huang Long (Chinese: 皇龍), (Hull 191) 63m Highspeed Catamaran built by Marinteknik Shipbuilders (Singapore) - (delivery deferred)
- Pan Long (Chinese: 蟠龍), (Hull 192) 63m Highspeed Catamaran built by Marinteknik Shipbuilders (Singapore) - (delivery deferred)

== Classes of Travel ==
- Dragon Suites - 8 or 4-seat private cabins, comfortable leather reclining seats
- First - generous seat pitch, comfortable leather reclining seats
- Premium Economy - comfortable leather reclining seats
- Economy - comfortable aircraft-style seating

== Special features ==
- 25 large 40"-50" Flat Screen TVs
- Dragon Suites feature plug and play AV connections to two 32" flat screen monitors with touch screen control panel
- 2 Kiosks offering a wide selection of refreshments
- Satellite based Internet using Wi-Fi technology was available throughout the vessel
- Internet Cafe
- Starbucks Coffee
- Fiji Water

== Technical specifications ==
Shen Long (Hull 189)

- Type: Aluminium hull fast catamaran ferry
- Passenger capacity: 1152 total
- Shipbuilder: Marinteknik Shipbuilders (S) PTE LTD.
- Length (LOA): 65 meters
- Beam: 16 meters Loaded
- Max.speed:37.5 knots
- Draught: 1.60 m
- Propulsion Generators: 4 x MTU 16V4000 M70
- WaterJet: 4 x MJP J850R QD
- Port of Registration: Hong Kong
- Classification: Lloyd’s Register of Shipping (LLOYDS) 100 A1 SSC Passenger(B) Catamaran HSC G4
