= Banfu =

Banfu 板芙镇
- Town
- Banfu is marked '11' on this map of Zhongshan

- Location within Guangdong
- Coordinates: 22°25′00″N 113°19′21″E
- Country: People's Republic of China
- Province: Guangdong
- Prefecture-level city: Zhongshan

Area
  - Total: 82.0 km^{2} (31.7 sq mi)

Population (2020)
  - Total: 95,876
  - Density: 1,170/km^{2} (3,030/sq mi)
- Time zone: UTC+8 (China Standard)
- Website: web.archive.org/web/20160628042202/http://www.banfu.gov.cn/

Banfu
- Traditional Chinese: 板芙鎮
- Simplified Chinese: 板芙镇
Transcriptions
Standard Mandarin
- Hanyu Pinyin: Bǎnfú Zhèn
Yue: Cantonese
- Yale Romanization: báan fùh jan

Banfu is a town situated at the southern periphery of the city of Zhongshan, Guangdong province. The population of Banfu town was 95,876 in 2020. The total area of the town is 82.0 square kilometres (31.7 sq mi).

== See also ==
- Shatian dialect
