= Nanqu Subdistrict =

Nanqu 南区街道
- Subdistrict
- Nanqu is labeled '2' on this map of Zhongshan
- Coordinates: 22°29′11″N 113°21′22″E
- Country: People's Republic of China
- Province: Guangdong
- Prefecture-level city: Zhongshan

Population (2020)
  - Total: 90,270
- Time zone: UTC+8 (China Standard)

Nanqu Subdistrict (simplified Chinese: 南区街道; traditional Chinese: 南區街道; pinyin: Nánqū Jiēdào; Jyutping: naam^{4} keoi^{1}gaai^{1}dou^{6}), also known as South Subdistrict or Southern Subdistrict, is a subdistrict of the city of Zhongshan, Guangdong province, China, covering 48 square kilometres (19 sq mi). At the 2020 census, the subdistrict had a population of 90,270. Many real estate companies and hotels have set up their businesses here, such as Vanke, Wing On and Agile Property.
