= Dongqu Subdistrict =

Dongqu 东区街道
- Subdistrict
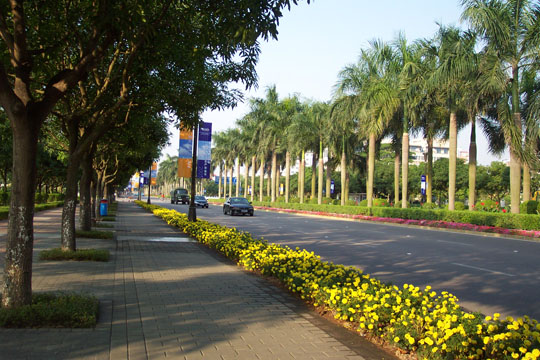
- Xingzhong Road (兴中道) in East District, Zhongshan

- Dongqu Subdistrict is labelled "1" on this map of Zhongshan

- Location in Guangdong
- Coordinates: 22°46′03″N 113°17′46″E
- Country: People's Republic of China
- Province: Guangdong
- Prefecture-level city: Zhongshan

Population (2020)
  - Total: 213,948
- Time zone: UTC+8 (China Standard)

Dongqu Subdistrict (simplified Chinese: 东区; traditional Chinese: 東區; pinyin: Dōng Qū; Jyutping: dung^{1} keoi^{1}), also known as East Subdistrict, or Eastern Subdistrict, is a subdistrict of Zhongshan City, Guangdong, China, which was established in 1987. It is the location of the Zhongshan Municipal Government, and is the political, economic, and cultural centre the city, and is renowned for being the (ancestral) hometown of 32,000 overseas Chinese. It covers 71.4 square kilometres (27.6 sq mi) and permanent population of 120,000. Officially, it is a subdistrict (东区街道).
