= Dongfeng, Zhongshan =

Dongfeng 东凤镇
- Town
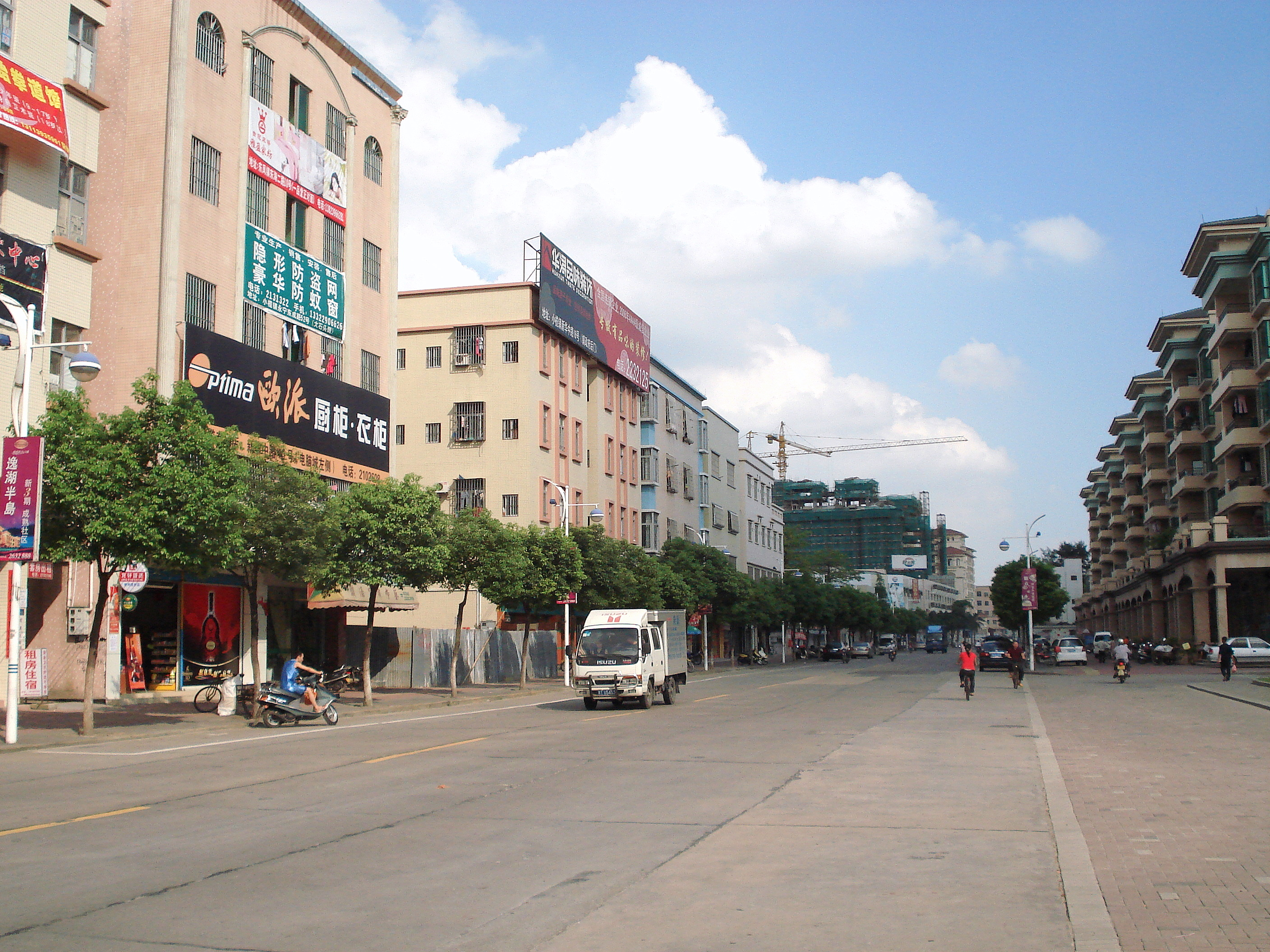

- Dongfeng is labeled '17' on this map of Zhongshan

- Location in Guangdong
- Coordinates: 22°42′09″N 113°15′25″E
- Country: People's Republic of China
- Province: Guangdong
- Prefecture-level city: Zhongshan

Population (2020)
  - Total: 201,023
- Time zone: UTC+8 (China Standard)

Dongfeng (simplified Chinese: 东凤镇; traditional Chinese: 東鳳鎮; pinyin: Dōngfèng zhèn) is a town in the north of Zhongshan, Guangdong, China. Dongfeng has a total area of 56.24 square kilometres (21.71 sq mi). It administers six residential communities and nine administrative villages, with a permanent population of approximately 220,000.

== Geography ==
Dongfeng Town extends roughly along a northwest–southeast axis. Its outermost village-level divisions are Donggubu Village to the east and south, Anle Village to the west, and Tong'an Village to the north.

Dongfeng is situated on the western side of the Pearl River Delta, on the alluvial plain between the Jiya Waterway and the Xiaolan Channel, both distributaries of the Xijiang River. It is the northernmost town in Zhongshan, second only to Huangpu Town in terms of latitude.

Dongfeng borders Nantou, Huangpu, Fusha, and Xiaolan within Zhongshan, as well as Ronggui and Jun'an in Shunde District, Foshan.

== Administrative divisions ==
Dongfeng Town administers 5 residential communities and 9 villages.

Residential communities

- Dongxing Community (东兴社区)
- Bogong Community (伯公社区)
- Minle Community (民乐社区)
- Xiaoli Community (小沥社区)
- Donghai Community (东海社区)

Villages

- Tong'an Village (同安村)
- Hetai Village (和泰村)
- Dongheping Village (东和平村)
- Donggubu Village (东罟步村)
- Yongyi Village (永益村)
- Anle Village (安乐村)
- Suicheng Village (穗成村)
- Jichang Village (吉昌村)
- Xigubu Village (西罟步村)

== Transportation ==
Dongfeng has a few bus routes, two ferry lines, and one railway line that crosses through.

=== Bus ===
Bus services in Dongfeng are primarily operated by two companies: Zhongshan Public Transport Group and Zhongshan Xiaolan Public Bus Co., Ltd. (Lanyun Bus). Zhongshan Public Transport mainly operates local services within the town, as well as routes connecting Dongfeng with Zhongshan's urban districts and neighbouring towns. Lanyun Bus mainly serves routes towards Xiaolan.

The main bus interchanges in Dongfeng are located at Dongfeng Town Government and Dongfeng People's Hospital. In addition, several bus stops near Shakou Bridge on China National Highway 105 function as important transfer points, as most services travelling between Xiaolan and Rongqi pass through this corridor.

The following bus routes serve Dongfeng:

Zhongshan Public Transport

- 303: Xiaolan Bus Terminal ↔ Huangpu Bus Terminal
- 320: Donggu Village ↔ Dongfeng Town Government
- 321: Circular service (Hesui Ecological Park ↔ Hesui Ecological Park)

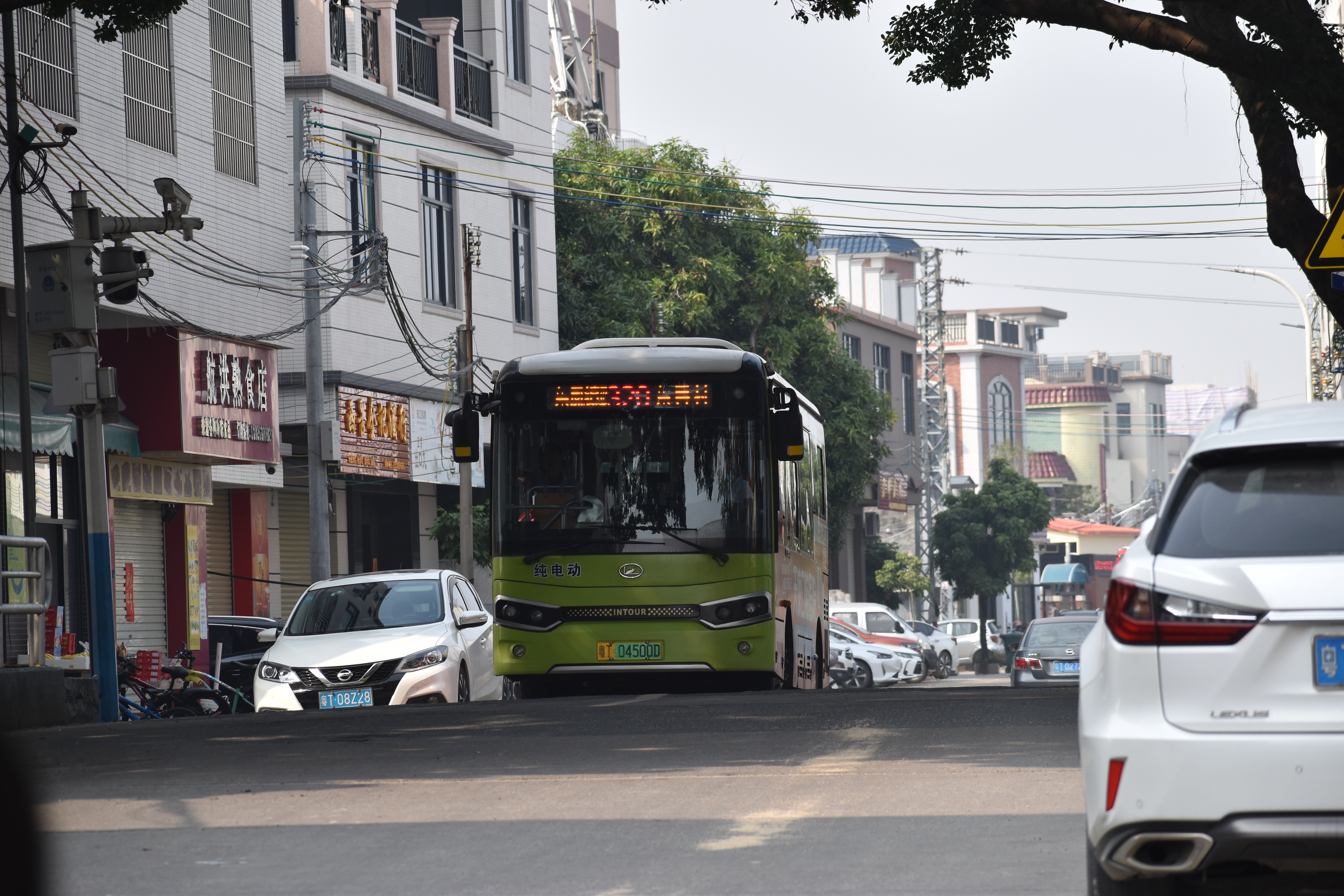
Zhongshan 320 bus to Donggucun

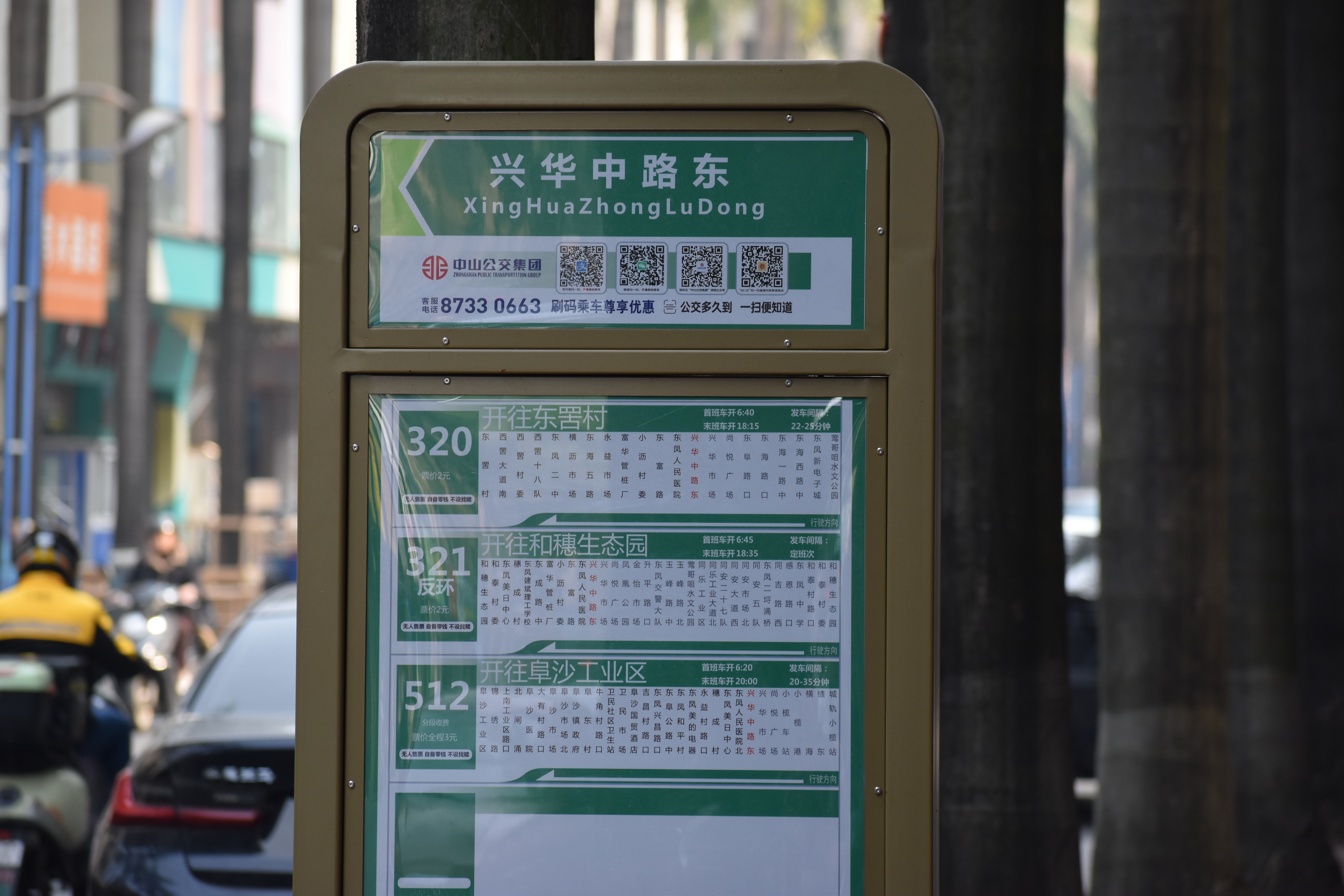
Bus stop sign in Dongfeng

The following are express inter-town routes. The prefix K stands for kuài (快), meaning "express".

- K12: Expo Center ↔ Dongfeng People's Hospital
- K20: Chengnan Bus Terminal ↔ Huangpu Bus Terminal
- K929: Dongfeng Town Government ↔ New Energy Vehicle Town Bus Terminal

Route K929 is jointly operated by Zhongshan Public Transport Group and Foshan Xinxieli Automobile Transportation Co., Ltd. It is the only cross-prefecture bus route serving Dongfeng.

Jointly operated by Zhongshan Public Transport and Lanyun Bus

Lanyun Bus does not operate any routes independently within Dongfeng. Instead, all of its services in the town are jointly operated with Zhongshan Public Transport Group.

- 512: Xiaolan Railway Station ↔ Fusha Industrial Zone
- 513: Xiaolan Bus Terminal ↔ Huangpu Bus Terminal

=== Railway ===
The Nansha Port Railway has a station located in Dongfeng Town. However, due to the progress of the project, passenger services are not currently available.

=== Ferry ===
Dongfeng Town has two ferry routes, connecting to Xiaolan Town and Nantou Town respectively.

The ferry service to Xiaolan Town departs from Shakou Ferry Terminal and crosses the Xiaolan Channel before arriving in Xiaolan Town. The ferry service to Nantou Town departs from Hetai Ferry Terminal and crosses the Jiya Channel before arriving in Nantou Town.
