= Shatian dialect =

Yue Chinese dialect

Satinese
- 沙田話
- Native to: Southern China
- Language family: Sino-Tibetan: Sinitic; Unclassified (Yue Chinese?); Tanka dialect; Satinese

Language codes
- ISO 639-3: –
- ISO 639-6: stns
- Glottolog: None

Shatian dialect
- Traditional Chinese: 沙田話
- Simplified Chinese: 沙田话
Transcriptions
Standard Mandarin
- Hanyu Pinyin: Shatianhuà
Yue: Cantonese
- Jyutping: Saa1 tin4 waa6-2

Satinese (Saatinwaa in Satinese, Shatianhua in Guoyu) is a dialect of Yue Chinese. It is spoken by roughly half of the population of Chungsan (Zhongshan), Guangdong, in Namtau, Wongpo, Fausa, Manchung, Gonghau, Tungsing, Tungfung, Siulaam, Wanglan, Salong, Panfu, Sanwan and Tanchau.

It differs from Standard Cantonese. Some subdialects among the Satin dialect are similar to Suntak dialect. Satin Regions in Zhongshan are populated with Tanka people and the language is one of the major branches of Tanka dialect.
