= Minzhong (disambiguation) =

Minzhong or Min Zhong may refer to:

- Central Min, a group of Min dialects spoken in central Fujian, China
- Minzhong, Zhongshan, a town in Guangdong, China
- Fuzhou, a city on the location of the Qin-era Minzhong prefecture
- Yu Minzhong (1714–1779), an official of the Qing dynasty in China
