= Shenwan =

Shenwan 神湾镇
- Town
- Shenwan is labeled '10' on this map of Zhongshan

- Location within Guangdong
- Coordinates: 22°18′09″N 113°21′50″E
- Country: People's Republic of China
- Province: Guangdong
- Prefecture-level city: Zhongshan

Area
  - Total: 59.0 km^{2} (22.8 sq mi)

Population
  - Total: 38,872 (2,020)
  - Density: 659/km^{2} (1,710/sq mi)
- Time zone: UTC+8 (China Standard)
- Website: www.shenwan.gov.cn

Shenwan
- Traditional Chinese: 神灣鎮
- Simplified Chinese: 神湾镇
Transcriptions
Standard Mandarin
- Hanyu Pinyin: Shénwān Zhèn
Yue: Cantonese
- Yale Romanization: sàhn wāan jan
- Jyutping: san^{4}waan^{1} zan^{3}

Shenwan is a town situated at the southwest periphery of the city of Zhongshan, Guangdong province. The population of Shenwan was 38,872 in 2020. The total area of the town is 59.0 square kilometres (22.8 sq mi).

The town is noted for its pineapples, which can be seen on sale by many street vendors.

== See also ==
- Shatian dialect
