= Henglan =

Henglan 横栏镇
- Town
- Henglan is labeled '14' in this map of Zhongshan

- Location within Guangdong
- Coordinates: 22°32′05″N 113°14′57″E
- Country: People's Republic of China
- Province: Guangdong
- Prefecture-level city: Zhongshan

Area
  - Total: 76.6 km^{2} (29.6 sq mi)

Population (2020)
  - Total: 200,522
  - Density: 2,620/km^{2} (6,780/sq mi)
- Time zone: UTC+8 (China Standard)
- Website: www.henglan.gov.cn

Henglan
- Traditional Chinese: 橫欄鎮
- Simplified Chinese: 横栏镇
Transcriptions
Standard Mandarin
- Hanyu Pinyin: Hénglán Zhèn
Yue: Cantonese
- Yale Romanization: wàahng làahn jan
- Jyutping: waang^{4}laan^{4} zan^{3}

Henglan is a town situated at the eastern periphery of the city of Zhongshan, Guangdong province. At the 2020 census, the population of Henglan was 200,522. The total area of the town is 76.0 square kilometres (29.3 sq mi).its geographical coordinates are 22° 31' 34" North, 113° 15' 37" East and its original name (with diacritics) is Henglan.

== See also ==
- Shatian dialect
