= Guzhen International Lighting Fair =

Trade show on China

- Founded: 1982
- Headquarters: Guangdong, China
- Products: Exhibition
- Website: www.gzlightingfair.com

Guzhen International Lighting Fair (Chinese: 古镇国际灯饰博览会) is a biannual trade show for lighting fixtures in Guzhen, Guangdong, China.

== History ==
- The 16th fair October 2015 22–26 was held in Zhongshan City, Guangdong Province in the oldTown Convention and Exhibition center.
- The 15th fare was at the Convention and Exhibition Center
- The 13 Fair was held in the conference and Expo center.
- The 13th fair was held in 2013 in Zhongshan Cit.
- From October 18, 2013 to 21, the ancient town of twelfth town lights Fair
