= Guzhen =

Guzhen may refer to:

- Guzhen County (固镇县), Bengbu, Anhui
- Guzhen Town (固镇镇), Yu'an District, Lu'an, Anhui
- Guzhen Town (古镇镇), Zhongshan, Guangdong
