= Opple Lighting =

Chinese lighting company

OPPLE Lighting Limited 欧普照明股份有限公司
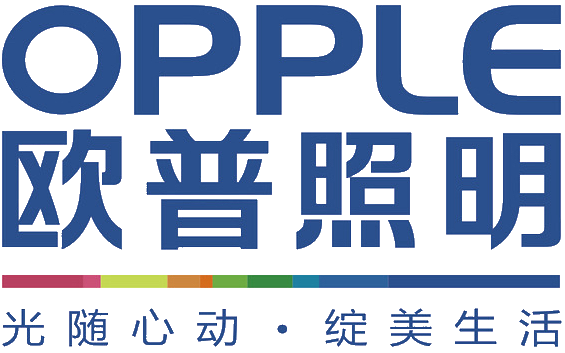
- Type: Private
- Industry: Lighting
- Founded: Zhongshan, Guangdong, China, 1996
- Headquarters: Shanghai, China
- Key people: Wang YaoHai (CEO); Ma Xiuhui (President)
- Number of employees: 6,200 (2013)
- Website: opple.com

Opple Lighting
- Simplified Chinese: 欧普照明
- Traditional Chinese: 歐普照明
Transcriptions
Standard Mandarin
- Hanyu Pinyin: Ōupǔ Zhàomíng

OPPLE Lighting is a Chinese multinational lighting corporation headquartered in Shanghai, China. Founded in 1996, the firm's sales and service cover over 50 countries with over 30,000 sales outlets.

== History ==
=== Foundation and early years ===
Founded in Zhongshan, Guangdong province in 1996 by Madam. Ma and Mr. Wang, OPPLE began as a manufacturer of ceiling lights and quickly moved into CFLs during its first years. In 1999–2000 Opple rolled-out its first OPPLE branded stores in China. In 2001, it moved from a China-only brand to expanding internationally in the Middle East, Europe, India and South East Asia. In 2009 it opened its global headquarters in Shanghai. In 2016 Opple was listed on the Shanghai stock exchange (SHA: 603515).

=== Domestic expansion ===
Its domestic sales network covers 95% of cities above county level through 4,000 Opple stores and 30,000 sales outlets.

Domestically, it has provided lighting for clients including Burger King, Starbucks, Adidas and Holiday Inn.

=== International expansion ===
Since 2001, OPPLE had begun expanding internationally with the opening of offices in 6 countries.

- Asia Pacific:

- OPPLE Lahore, Pakistan Office - OPPLE New Delhi, India Office - OPPLE Bangkok, Thailand Office

- Europe:

- OPPLE Eindhoven, Netherlands Office

- Latin America:

- OPPLE São Paulo, Brazil Office

- Middle East and Africa:

- OPPLE Dubai Office - OPPLE South Africa Office

OPPLE has provided lighting to the governments of Uruguay, Thailand, South Africa and Egypt.

== Plant and office expansion ==
OPPLE has invested over US$150M in building the largest lighting industrial site in Asia (Wujiang production and R&D center), featuring a production floor area of over 600,000M2 as well as an attached R&D facility that employs over 400 engineers, scientists and technicians.

- 1996 – Headquarters built in Zhongshan, China
- 1999 – Opening of first factory in Guangdong, China
- 2000 – Office opening in Wuhan, China
- 2004 – Opening of first overseas branch office in Dubai, UAE
- 2009 – Headquarters moved to Shanghai, China
- 2012 – Opening of the OPPLE Wujiang factory (largest lighting manufacturing site in Asia) in Suzhou, China
- 2012 – Opening of the Shanghai Research Application Center
- 2013 – Opening of the R&D center adjacent to OPPLE Wujiang Factory
- 2013 – Opening of European head-office in Eindhoven, The Netherlands
- 2014 – Opening of Indian branch office in New Delhi, India
- 2015 - Opening offices in Belgium and Germany
- 2018 - Opening offices in Italy and Spain
- 2020 - Investing in 3rd production facility in South China

== Products ==
While OPPLE began as a CFL and ceiling fixture manufacturer, it has since expanded its product line to include a wider array of products and services. Its product line now heavily features LED, matching the global demand for more affordable and efficient lighting technology.

== R&D and innovation ==
OPPLE's Wujiang production center is the largest industrial lighting site in Asia, featuring fully automated assembly lines. In 2012 OPPLE opened its Research Application Center in Shanghai with the goal of researching the effects of light on health and human life. In 2012 OPPLE opened a large R&D center adjacent to its Wujiang factory. The OPPLE R&D center employs 400 engineers, technicians and designers and is one of the largest of its kind in Asia. The company maintains a US$20M annual investment in R&D and applied for over 200 patents in 2014.

International expansion Since 2001, OPPLE had begun expanding internationally with the opening of offices in 6 countries.

Asia Pacific: - OPPLE Lahore, Pakistan Office - OPPLE New Delhi, India Office - OPPLE Bangkok, Thailand Office

Europe: - OPPLE Eindhoven, Netherlands Office

Latin America: - OPPLE São Paulo, Brazil Office

Middle East and Africa: - OPPLE Dubai Office - OPPLE South Africa Office

OPPLE has provided lighting to the governments of Uruguay, Thailand, South Africa and Egypt.[7]

== See also ==
- Wujiang District, Suzhou
- Guzhen, Zhongshan
