= Chrysanthemum Festival (Xiaolan-Zhongshan) =

Festival in Guangdong, China

The Chrysanthemum Festival, is a festival held in the town of Xiaolan in November. Zhongshan is sometimes called "Chrysanthemum city" because of its chrysanthemum culture. During the Ming dynasty, people planted chrysanthemums and gathered together to appreciate them. While doing that, they also wrote poems, drew pictures and drank liquor. Later, these gatherings grew into chrysanthemum festivals, which were held every 10 years. In Qing dynasty, people started holding the Grand Chrysanthemum Festival, which is held every 60 years. Now, chrysanthemum festivals are held every year, and draw visitors from around the world.

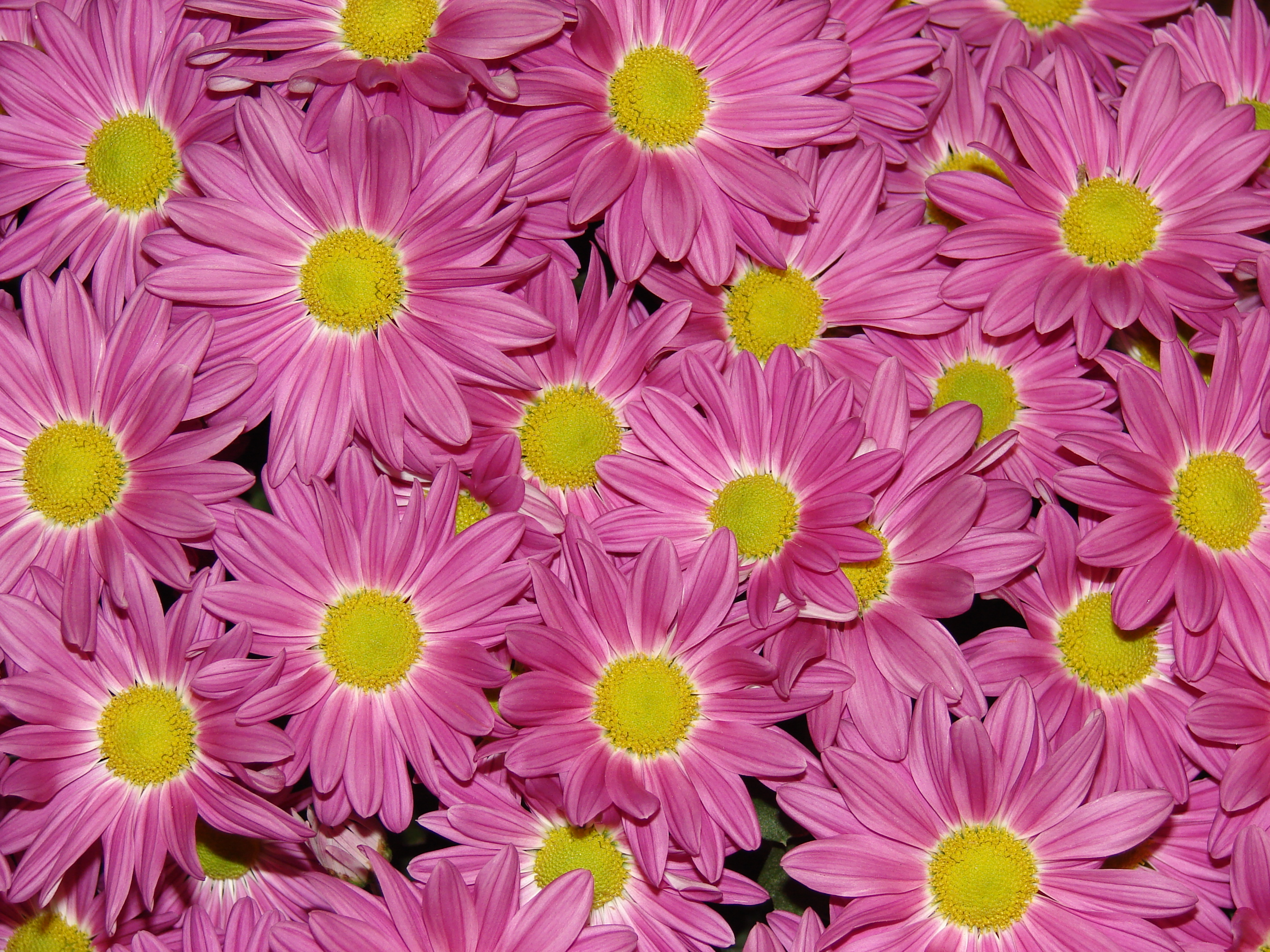
Chrysanthemum

== Origin ==
=== Southern Song dynasty ===
Legend says that during the Song dynasty, an imperial concubine ran away from the palace. She and several other people traveled to Xiaolan. Fascinated by the fertile land, mild climate, and beautiful chrysanthemums there, they decided to settle and plant chrysanthemum.

=== Ming dynasty ===
At that time people were adept at chrysanthemum planting and like appreciating chrysanthemums very much. As chrysanthemum planting was prevailing, when chrysanthemums were in bloom, people liked gathering together enjoying both the beautiful flowers and liquors.

=== Qing dynasty ===
- Kangxi period

People were more experienced in chrysanthemum planting, with complete techniques of shaping and maintaining chrysanthemums. Also, chrysanthemums were diverse in color and the shape of pedal as a result of the introduction of new breeds from Shanghai and other places. local rich and power people were obsessed with chrysanthemum appreciation, so the chrysanthemum planting industry started to boom.

- Qianlong period

In 1736, people in Xiaolan started to hold "Chrysanthemum Planting Contest", in which people gathered the chrysanthemum together and saw whose was the best. The judges decided which one was the winner with the criteria of the shape of blossoms and the density of leaves. Five years later, instead of a contest, people started to hold "Chrysanthemum Gathering". During that, families and close friends gathered together with the chrysanthemum they planted. At the same time, people drew pictures of the blossoms, write and read poem about the blossom and drink liquor together. In 1782, the gatherings got larger, as more and more people hold them together. In these larger gatherings, people start decorating their houses with chrysanthemum, making the beautiful "Chrysanthemum Tower" and "Chrysanthemum Terrace".

- Jiaqing period

In 1814, in honor the former generations' achievement, people held the grandest gathering and called it "Chrysanthemum Festival". They also decided to hold the grandest festival like that every 60 years. In 1874, 1934, and 1994 the grandest festivals was held, and the whole city was decorated with chrysanthemum.

== later developments ==
=== 1959 ===
To celebrate the 10th anniversary of the founding of the People's Republic of China, the first Chrysanthemum Festival in modern China. For the first time, chrysanthemums was used to make a giant pictures, the Peace Dove. With a lot of media report, Xiaolan was hailed as "Chrysanthemum City".

=== 1979 ===
What's special about the Chrysanthemum Festival of that year is that it attracted oversea Chinese. Many of them returned to China for the first time to see the beautiful chrysanthemum arranged in different shapes. From then on, more and more oversea Chinese returned to Zhongshan and made tremendous contributions to local developments.

=== 1994 ===
It was the year when the grandest chrysanthemum festival was held. Almost the whole town was covered with beautiful chrysanthemums as the chrysanthemum exhibition area took up an area of 10,000 square meters. Many streets were decorated with chrysanthemums, with a total length of 16 kilometers. The number of the pots of chrysanthemum reach 820,000, and many of them was arranged into a tall tower, The Great White Peony, which broke a Guinness Record.

=== Recent years ===
In 2008, 2009, 2010 and 2011, Chrysanthemum Festivals with special themes were held in memory of respectively the 30th anniversary of The Reform and open policy, 60th anniversary of the forming of the People's Republic of China, the Asian Games held in Guangzhou, and the 100th anniversary of victory of anti-Fascist War.

=== Current format ===
There are two major kinds of exhibitions in the Festival—Chrysanthemum-planting contest and Chrysanthemum modelling, in which chrysanthemums are piled up or arranged into patterns or objects.

- Chrysanthemum-planting Contest This is similar to older events. In this section people show others their best chrysanthemums. Chrysanthemums are judged based on the shape of the petals, the figure of the whole blossom, the density of the leaves etc.
- Large Modeling Exhibition This is a more modern development. Chrysanthemums are piled up to be large scale Chinese characters, life-sized animals and big buildings.

== Chrysanthemum culture ==
=== Overview ===
People in Xiaolan loves chrysanthemum, and pass down the technique of chrysanthemum planting from generation to generation. With innovation of the techniques, many world records have been broken there, especially in grand festivals held every ten years and the grandest festivals held every sixty years. Chrysanthemum culture has been a very important part of the local culture, and it facilitate cultural exchange with outside world and helps improve people's cultural cultivation.

=== Nickname--Chrysanthemum City ===
Xiaolan is well known for its nickname Chrysanthemum City in China. It first got this nickname in 1959, when the first Chrysanthemum Festival in modern China was held. For the first time people used chrysanthemum to make a beautiful 10 meters' long and 7 meters' tall picture—The Peace Dove. With the documentary Chrysanthemum made and a wide range nationwide media coverage, Xiaolan got famous for its chrysanthemum and was hailed as Chrysanthemum City.

=== Chrysanthemum Food culture ===
Since Xiaolan people have such a deep relationship with chrysanthemum, and love to eat, they have created the special Xiaolan chrysanthemum food. Although chrysanthemums are colorful, only a small number of them are edible, and we usually use the yellow edible chrysanthemums to make food. With the sweet smell and bright yellow color of chrysanthemums, the smell and look of food will be improved a lot.

==== Some Famous Chrysanthemum Food ====
- Chrysanthemum "Bran" is made of chrysanthemum and sugar. Usually people heat dried chrysanthemum petal, sugar and little water together into a paste, then cool it. They then smash it into pieces. This is a basic ingredient in other chrysanthemum food.
- Chrysanthemum "meat" is not actually the meat of chrysanthemum, but fat pork. Usually the crystal fat pork cured together with chrysanthemum "Bran" and plenty of sugar.
- Chrysanthemum glue pudding is glue pudding with chrysanthemum "Bran" and red bean paste as filling. It is often served in chrysanthemum soup.
