= Dongsheng, Guangdong =

Dongsheng 东升镇
- Town
- Location in Guangdong
- Coordinates: 22°37′22″N 113°17′30″E
- Country: People's Republic of China
- Province: Guangdong
- Prefecture-level city: Zhongshan
- Village-level divisions: 8 residential communities 6 villages

Area
  - Total: 79.2 km^{2} (30.6 sq mi)

Population
  - Total: 128,000
  - Density: 1,620/km^{2} (4,190/sq mi)
- Time zone: UTC+8 (China Standard)
- Postal code: 528414
- Area code: 0760
- Website: dongsheng.gov.cn

Dongsheng (simplified Chinese: 东升; traditional Chinese: 東升; pinyin: Dōngshēng; Jyutping: dung^{1}sing^{1}; lit. 'east ascends') is a town in north-central Zhongshan, Guangdong province, People's Republic of China. It has a total population of 128,000, including a resident population of 67,000 and migrant population of 60,000, residing in an area of 79.2 square kilometres (30.6 sq mi). As of 2011, it has 8 residential communities (社区) and 6 villages under its administration.

On 19 July 2021, with the approval of the People's Government of Guangdong Province, Xiaolan Town and Dongsheng Town were abolished, and a new Xiaolan Town was established. Dongsheng is now part of Xiaolan Town.

== Transportation ==
Dongsheng railway station is a station on the Guangzhou–Zhuhai intercity railway serving the town. Due to persistently low passenger patronage, very few trains called at Dongsheng railway station. On 10 April 2021, Dongsheng railway station ceased operations.

== See also ==
- List of township-level divisions of Guangdong
- Shatian dialect
