= Tanzhou Town =

Tanzhou 坦洲
- Town
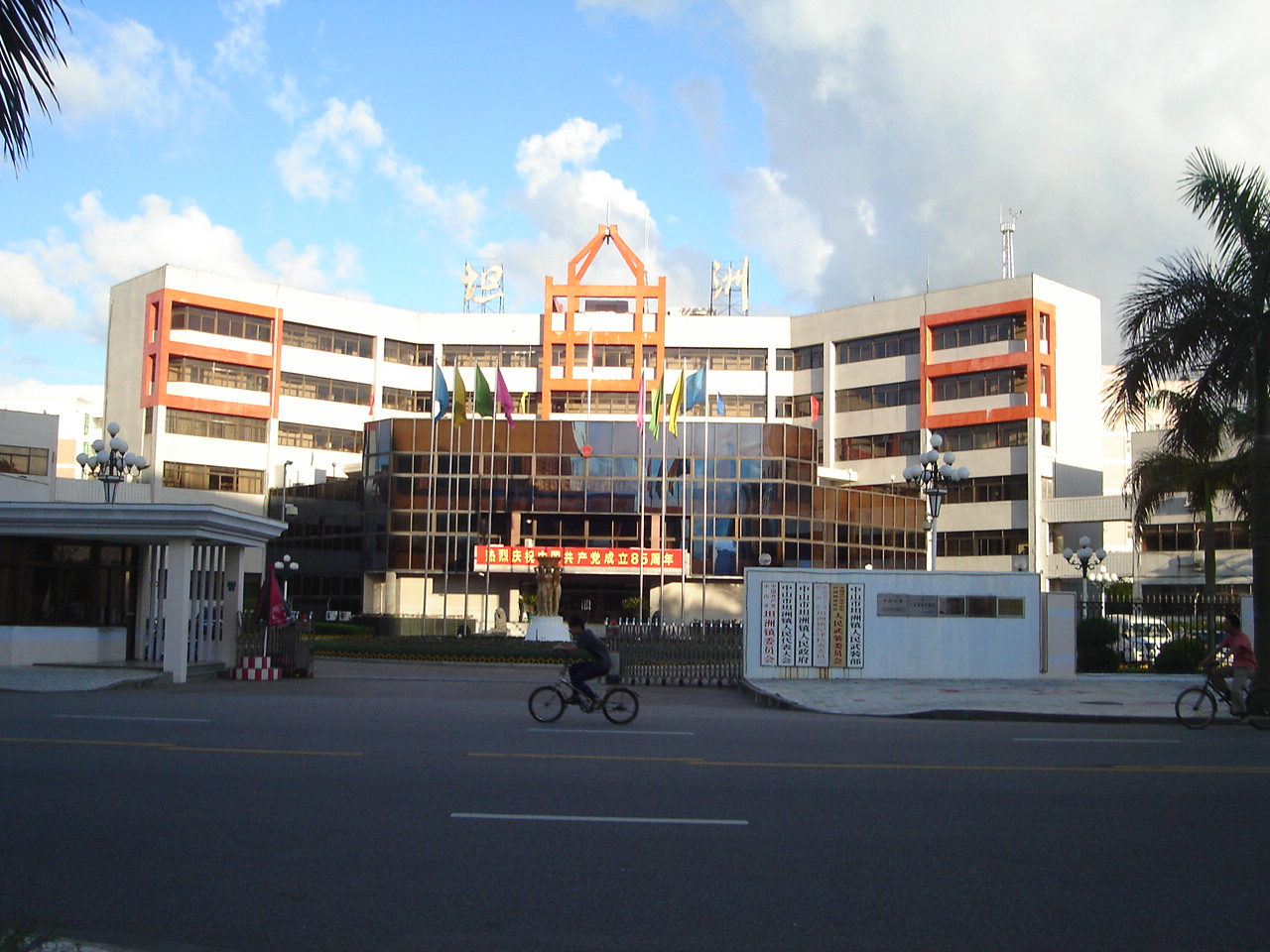
- Tanzhou Town Government Building

- Tanzhou is labeled '9' on this map of Zhongshan

- Location in Guangdong
- Coordinates: 22°15′16″N 113°28′05″E
- Country: People's Republic of China
- Province: Guangdong
- Prefecture-level city: Zhongshan

Area
  - Total: 129.58 km^{2} (50.03 sq mi)

Population (2026)
  - Total: 382,000
  - Density: 2,947.99/km^{2} (7,635.3/sq mi)
- Time zone: UTC+8 (China Standard)
- Website: www.tanzhou.gov.cn

Tanzhou Town
- Traditional Chinese: 坦洲鎮
- Simplified Chinese: 坦洲镇
Transcriptions
Standard Mandarin
- Hanyu Pinyin: Tǎnzhōu Zhèn
Yue: Cantonese
- Yale Romanization: táan jāu jan
- Jyutping: taan^{2}zau^{1} zan^{3}

Tanzhou is a town situated at the southern extremity of the prefecture-level city of Zhongshan, Guangdong province. According to the Tanzhou Government in 7th of August, 2026, the population of Tanzhou was around 420,000. The total area of the town is 136 square kilometres (53 sq mi). Tanzhou is within 10 km (6.2 mi) northwest of the border with Macau and borders Zhuhai to the south and east; it is thus much closer to central Zhuhai than central Zhongshan.

== History ==
In the past, Tanzhou was known as Jindouwan (金斗湾). Due to Pearl River Sediment accumulation, land and islets formed at the end of the Ming Dynasty and the early Qing Dynasty. At that time, people who lived there used to call the beach "Tan" (坦), and the islets "Zhou"(洲). Hence, it became Tanzhou this name's origin.

The name Tanzhou existed in 1955 as an administrative subdivision. Between 1955 and 1986, there were several name changes, in December 1986, it was renamed Tanzhou Town.

== Culture ==
Tanzhou was known as the origin of Zhongshan Xianshui Song. In 2006, Xianshui Song got recognised as the Intangible Cultural Heritage of China.

== See also ==
- Shatian dialect
