= Gangkou, Zhongshan =

Gangkou 港口镇
- Town
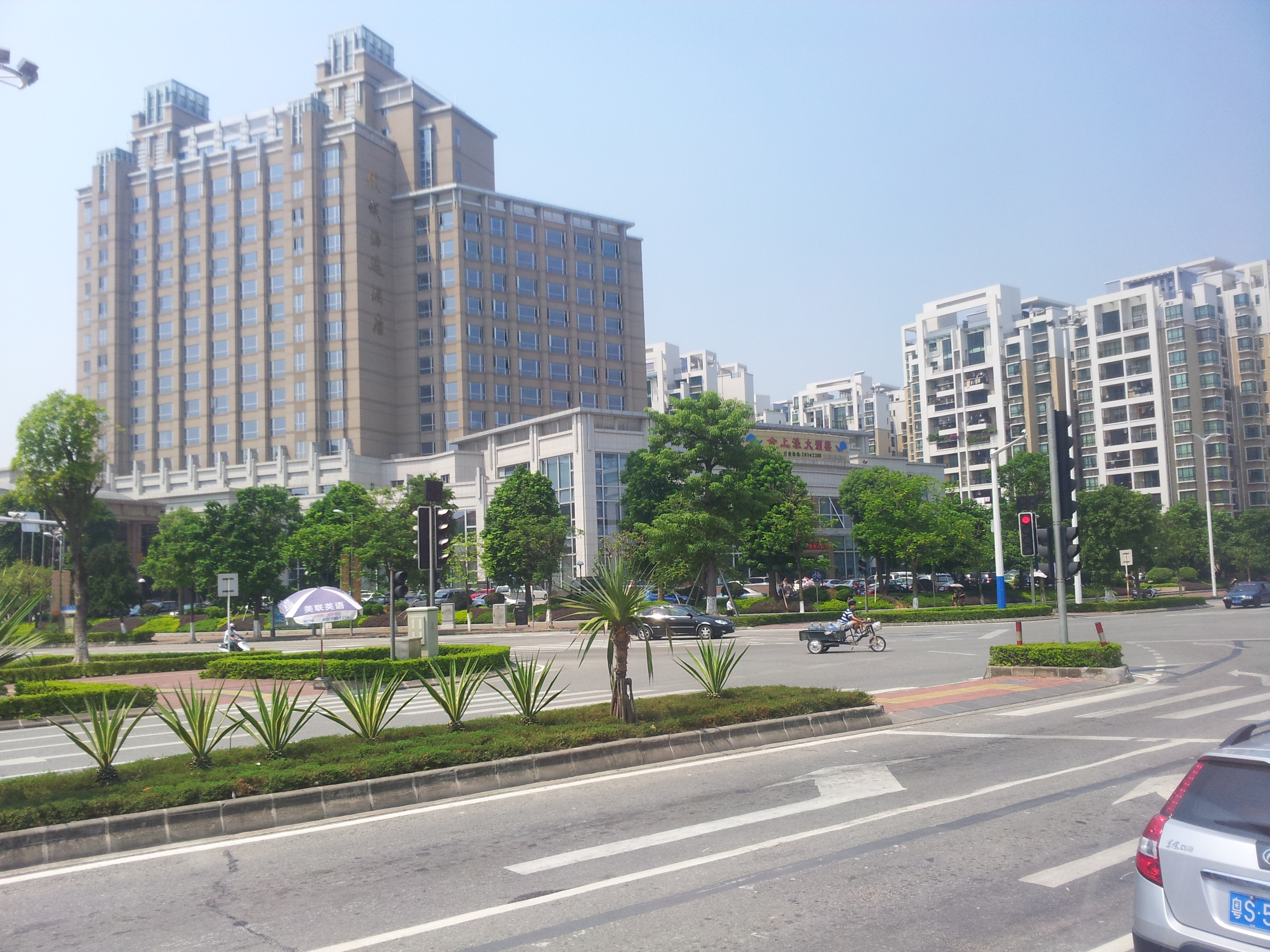

- Gangkou is labeled '22' in this map of Zhongshan

- Location in Guangdong
- Coordinates: 22°35′07″N 113°23′09″E
- Country: People's Republic of China
- Province: Guangdong
- Prefecture-level city: Zhongshan

Area
  - Total: 70.5 km^{2} (27.2 sq mi)

Population (2020)
  - Total: 140,134
  - Density: 1,990/km^{2} (5,150/sq mi)
- Time zone: UTC+8 (China Standard)

Gangkou (Chinese: 港口镇; pinyin: Gǎngkǒu zhèn; Jyutping: gong^{2}hau^{2} zan^{3}) is a town under the administration of the prefecture-level city of Zhongshan, in the Pearl River Delta region of Guangdong province, China, and is located to the north of downtown Zhongshan.
