= Nantou, Zhongshan =

Nantou 南头镇
- Town
- Nantou is labeled '18' on this map of Zhongshan

- Location in Guangdong
- Coordinates (Nantou government): 22°43′03″N 113°17′30″E
- Country: People's Republic of China
- Province: Guangdong
- Prefecture-level city: Zhongshan

Area
  - Total: 30.0 km^{2} (11.6 sq mi)

Population
  - Total: 158,234 (2,020)
  - Density: 5,270/km^{2} (13,700/sq mi)
- Time zone: UTC+8 (China Standard)
- Website: www.nantou.gov.cn

Nantou, Zhongshan
- Traditional Chinese: 南頭鎮
- Simplified Chinese: 南头镇
Transcriptions
Standard Mandarin
- Hanyu Pinyin: Nántóu Zhèn
Yue: Cantonese
- Yale Romanization: nàahm tàuh jan

Nantou is a town situated at the northern periphery of the city of Zhongshan, Guangdong province. The population of Nantou has 130,712 residents. The total area of the town is 30.7 square kilometres (11.9 sq mi).

== Transportation ==
Nantou is served by Nantou railway station on the Guangzhou–Zhuhai intercity railway as well as Guangdong Provincial Expressway 43 (S43; 广珠西线高速公路).

== See also ==
- Shatian dialect
