= Guzhen, Guangdong =

Guzhen 古镇镇
- Town
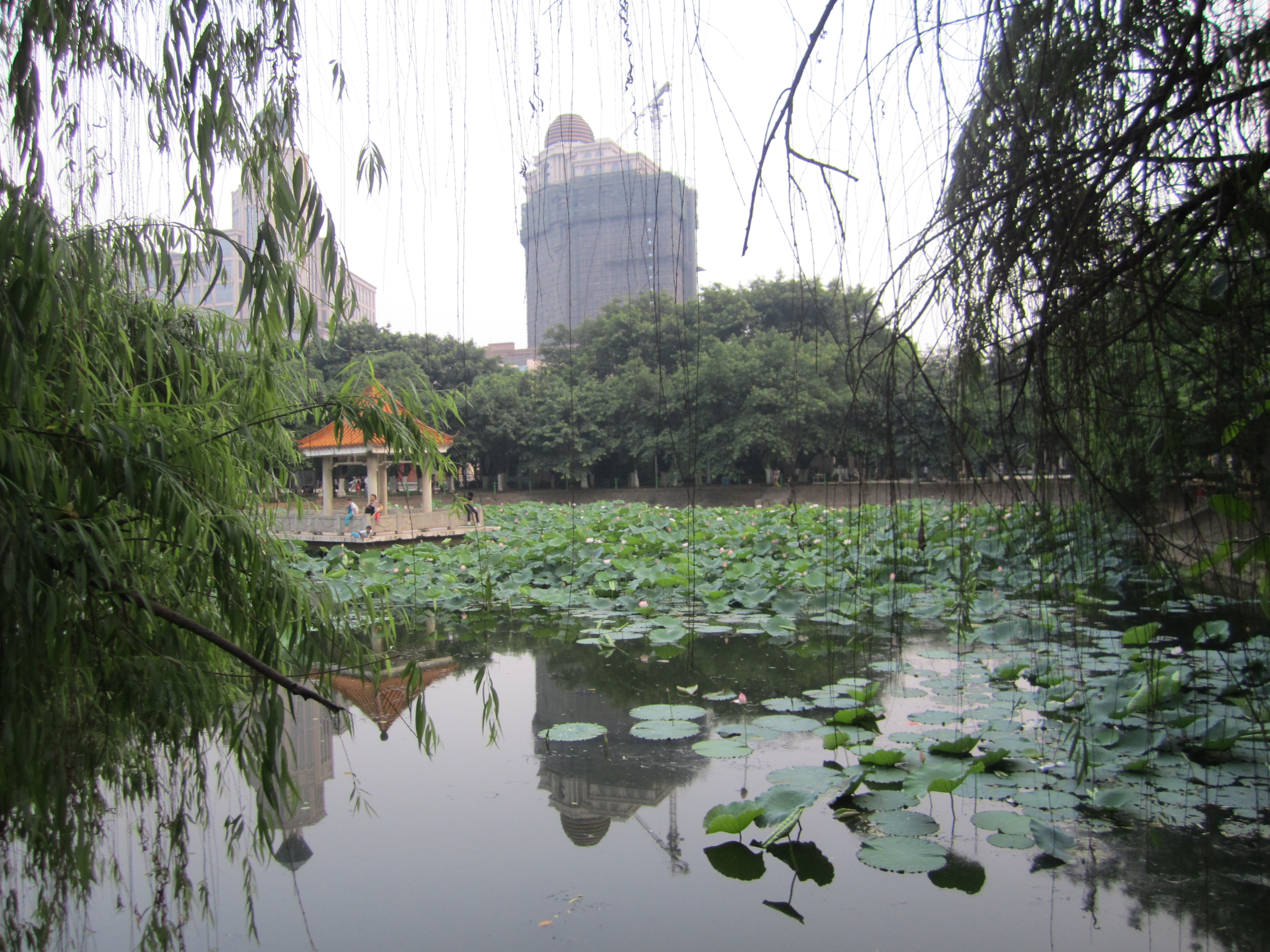
- Guzhen park

- Guzhen is labeled '15' on this map of Zhongshan

- Location within Guangdong
- Coordinates (Guzhen government): 22°36′45″N 113°11′27″E
- Country: People's Republic of China
- Province: Guangdong
- Prefecture-level city: Zhongshan

Population
  - Total: 230,405 (2,020)
- Time zone: UTC+8 (China Standard)

Guzhen (simplified Chinese: 古镇镇; traditional Chinese: 古鎮鎮; pinyin: Gǔzhèn Zhèn; Jyutping: gu^{2}zan^{3} zan^{3}) is a town situated on the northwest periphery of the city of Zhongshan, Pearl River Delta, Guangdong Province, some 23 kilometres (14 mi) from the city center.

The town is best known for manufacturing lighting. In recent years the town has grown into a place with thousands of small and big factories all related to lighting in one way or the other. Many international lighting companies have factories and showrooms in Guzhen town, which is about one and a half hours drive from Guangzhou Baiyun International Airport. From Hong Kong, it takes two hours to reach the Zhongshan ferry terminal and another 30 minutes to Guzhen Town. The population of Guzhen Town is estimated at 75,000 permanent residents with a floating population of up to 30,000.

== Administration ==
The area of Guzhen is divided into twenty administrative districts each with a resident committee.

== Geography ==
The town of Guzhen is bordered by Jiangmen to the West, with the Xi river serving as a boundary. The Xi river forms part of the Pearl River. Foshan borders Guzhen to the north. Zhongshan Xiaolan borders to the northwest and Henglan to the south.

== Economics ==
=== Lighting industry ===
Dubbed the "Lighting Capital of China" by the China Light Industry Council and China Association of Lighting Industry, Guzhen is the largest production base of lighting fittings in China and one of the four largest lighting fitting distributing centers in the world. In 2001, lighting fittings produced in Guzhen made up 60% of the Chinese market with exports reaching $1 billion. The production of lighting fittings is the primary industry in Guzhen, accounting for nearly 88% of the town's industrial output.

The development of the lighting fittings industry in Guzhen can be traced back to the late 1970s, however, the first significant developments took place from the mid-1980s to early 1990s. The Guzhen International Lighting Fair is a biannual event established in 1982. Due to the rapid economic development of China, Guzhen's lighting fittings industry has undergone unprecedented growth in the past two decades.

Guzhen's growth at the turn of the millennium was unprecedented, boasting a 50% increase in lighting enterprises from 1999 to 2001, with exports increasing from $40 million to $250 million. In the year 2013, total exports for lighting items from Guzhen Town exceeded $1 billion, as per unofficial sources.

While Guzhen now primarily produces non-branded OEM goods for international companies, it has spawned some domestic players in the industry, such as: Huayi, Opple lighting, Senqiu, and BECO Lights.
