= Minzhong =

Minzhong 民众街道
- Subdistrict
- Minzhong is labeled '21' on this map of Zhongshan

- Location in Guangdong
- Coordinates: 22°37′19″N 113°29′38″E
- Country: People's Republic of China
- Province: Guangdong
- Prefecture-level city: Zhongshan

Area
  - Total: 125.4 km^{2} (48.4 sq mi)

Population
  - Total: 112,345 (2,020)
  - Density: 895.9/km^{2} (2,320/sq mi)
- Time zone: UTC+8 (China Standard)
- Website: www.minzhong.gov.cn

Minzhong
- Traditional Chinese: 民眾鎮
- Simplified Chinese: 民众镇
Transcriptions
Standard Mandarin
- Hanyu Pinyin: Mínzhòng Zhèn
Yue: Cantonese
- Yale Romanization: màhn jung jan

Minzhong is a subdistrict situated at the northeastern periphery of the city of Zhongshan, in the Pearl River Delta region of Guangdong province. At the 2020 census, the population of Minzhong was 112,345. The total area of the subdistrict is 125.4 square kilometres (48.4 sq mi).

== See also ==
- Shatian dialect
