= Fusha, Zhongshan =

Fusha 阜沙镇
- Town
- Fusha is labeled '23' on this map of Zhongshan

- Location within Guangdong
- Coordinates: 22°40′03″N 113°20′58″E
- Country: People's Republic of China
- Province: Guangdong
- Prefecture-level city: Zhongshan

Area
  - Total: 37.0 km^{2} (14.3 sq mi)

Population (2020)
  - Total: 73,381
  - Density: 1,980/km^{2} (5,140/sq mi)
- Time zone: UTC+8 (China Standard)
- Website: www.zsfs.gov.cn

Fusha, Zhongshan
- Traditional Chinese: 阜沙鎮
- Simplified Chinese: 阜沙镇
Transcriptions
Standard Mandarin
- Hanyu Pinyin: Fùshā Zhèn
Yue: Cantonese
- Yale Romanization: fauh sā jan

Fusha is a town situated at the northern periphery of the city of Zhongshan, Guangdong province. At the 2020 census, the town had a population of 73,381. The total area of the town is 37 square kilometres (14 sq mi).

== See also ==
- Shatian dialect
