= Huangpu, Zhongshan =

Huangpu 黄圃镇
- Town
- Huangpu is labelled "19" on this map of Zhongshan
- Country: China
- Province: Guangdong
- Prefecture-level city: Zhongshan

Area
  - Total: 88.35 km^{2} (34.11 sq mi)

Population
  - Total: 187,775 (2,020)
  - Estimate (2022): 148,700
  - Density: 2,125/km^{2} (5,505/sq mi)
- Time zone: UTC+8 (China standard time)
- Website: www.zs.gov.cn/hpz/index.html

Huangpu (simplified Chinese: 黄圃镇; traditional Chinese: 黃圃鎮; pinyin: Huángpǔ Zhèn) is a town in Zhongshan, Guangdong, China. Huangpu spans an area of 88.35 square kilometres (34.11 mi^{2}), and has a hukou population of 93,008 as of 2019.

== History ==
The area was organized as the Huangpu People's Commune (Chinese: 黄圃公社) in 1958. The people's commune was abolished in 1984, and the current iteration of Huangpu as a town was established in 1986.

== Geography ==
Major water features in Huangpu include the Guizhou Waterway in the north of the town, the Jiya Waterway in the south, the Hongqili Waterway in the east, and the Huangpu Waterway in the middle.

== Administrative divisions ==
Huangpu administers 4 residential communities (Chinese: 社区; pinyin: shèqū) and 12 administrative villages (Chinese: 行政村; pinyin: xíngzhèng cūn).

=== Administrative divisions ===
Huangpu administers the following 4 residential communities:

- Sanshe Community (Chinese: 三社社区)
- Yongping Community (Chinese: 永平社区)
- Xintang Community (Chinese: 新糖社区)
- Wenming Community (Chinese: 文明社区)

=== Villages ===
Huangpu administers the following 12 administrative villages:

- Xindi Village (Chinese: 新地村)
- Zhaofeng Village (Chinese: 兆丰村)
- Wulan Village (Chinese: 吴栏村)
- Dayan Village (Chinese: 大雁村)
- Dacen Village (Chinese: 大岑村)
- Shijun Village (Chinese: 石军村)
- Hengdang Village (Chinese: 横档村)
- Xinsha Village (Chinese: 新沙村)
- Ma'an Village (Chinese: 马安村)
- Tuanfan Village (Chinese: 团范村)
- Zhenyi Village (Chinese: 镇一村)
- Aoshan Village (Chinese: 鳌山村)

== Demographics ==
As of 2019, Huangpu has a hukou population of 93,008, however, this excludes the floating population, which is sizable in Zhongshan. A 2022 estimate put the town's hukou population at 100,000, and its floating population at about 48,700. In 2008, Huangpu had a hukou population of 84,876. In the 2000 Chinese Census, Huangpu had a population of 98,373.

== Economy ==
In 2022, Huangpu had a total gross domestic product of 12.68 billion renminbi (RMB), a 1.3% increase from 2021. The town's primary sector accounted for 0.773 billion RMB (6.10% of total GDP), while its secondary sector accounted for 7.677 billion RMB (60.54% of total GDP), and its tertiary sector accounted for 4.23 billion RMB (33.36% of total GDP). Agriculture, forestry, animal husbandry, and fishing accounted for 0.75 billion RMB (5.91% of total GDP). The total retail sale of consumer goods in Huangpu totaled 6.33 billion RMB.

In 2022, Huangpu imported 1.182 billion RMB of goods, and exported 10.404 billion RMB of goods, giving the town a total trade-to-GDP ratio of 91.37%.

The town's budget for 2022 included local revenues of 0.449 billion RMB, and local expenditures of 1.046 billion RMB.

Companies headquartered in Huangpu include Zhongshan Tianmei Electrical Appliances, Zhonshan Yuanhe Metal Products, and Panshun Plastic.

== Education ==
As of 2022, Huangpu has a total of 15 schools, including one private primary school and one nine-year school, serving 18,800 students. The town also has 20 kindergartens, serving 5,947 students.

Huangpu has a public library, four public studies, and a cultural center.

== Healthcare ==
Huangpu has one hospital, one community health center, and 13 community health stations. These facilities are staffed by 1,019 personnel, and host 700 beds, as of 2022.

== Transportation ==
Provincial Highway 364 runs through Huangpu.
