= Zhongshan =

Prefecture-level city in Guangdong, China

Zhongshan 中山市 Chungshan; Jungsaan
- Prefecture-level city
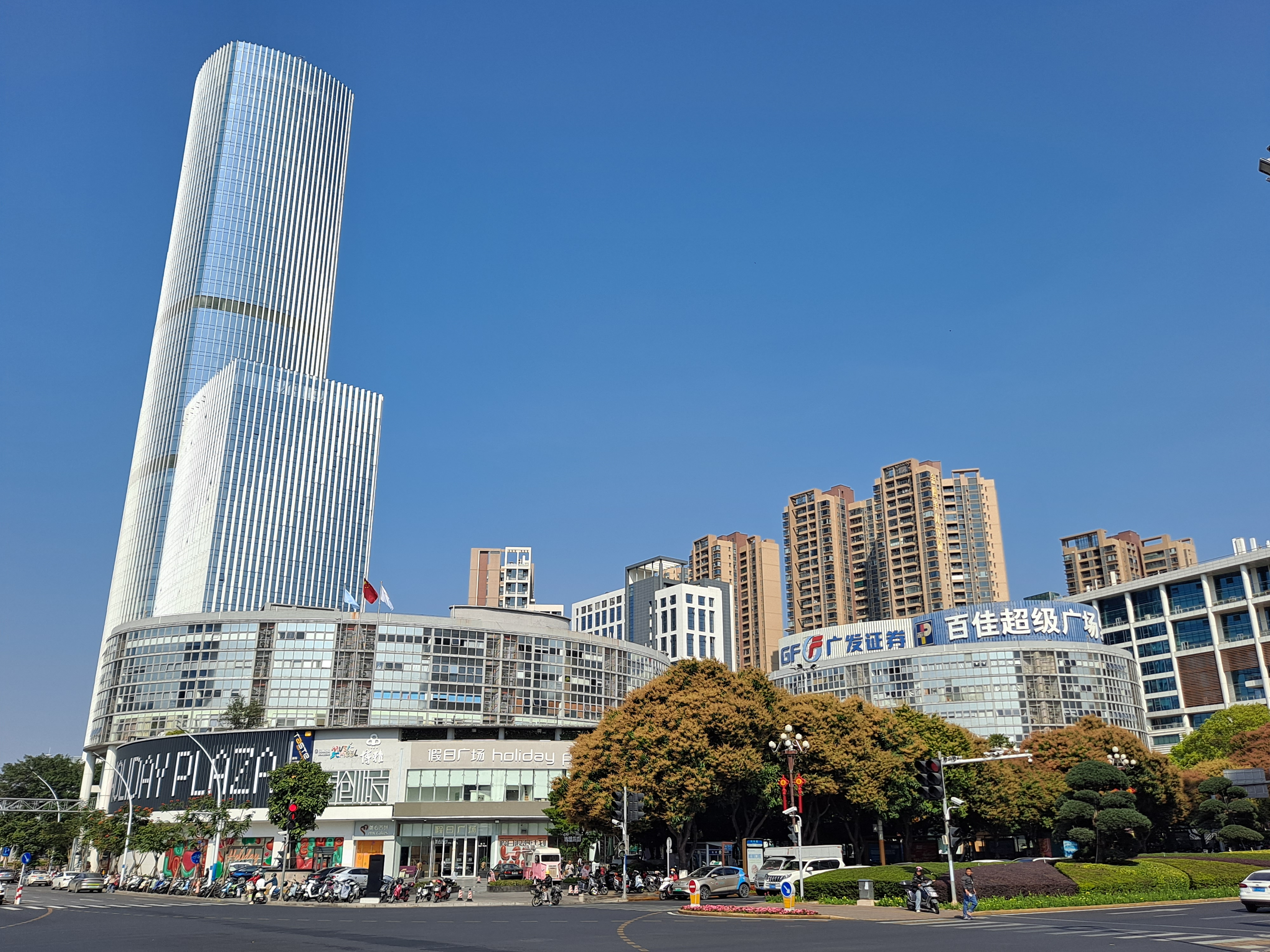
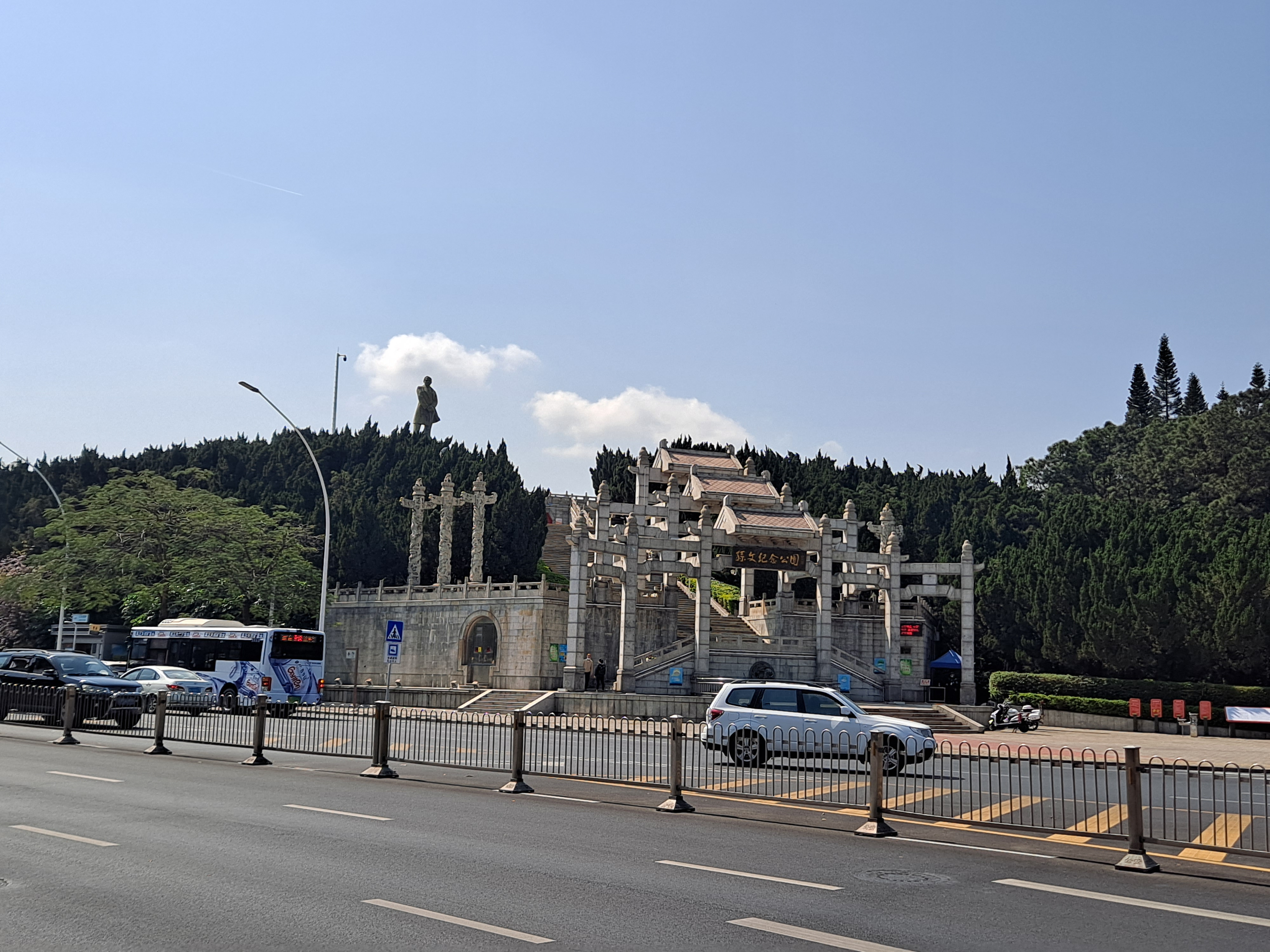
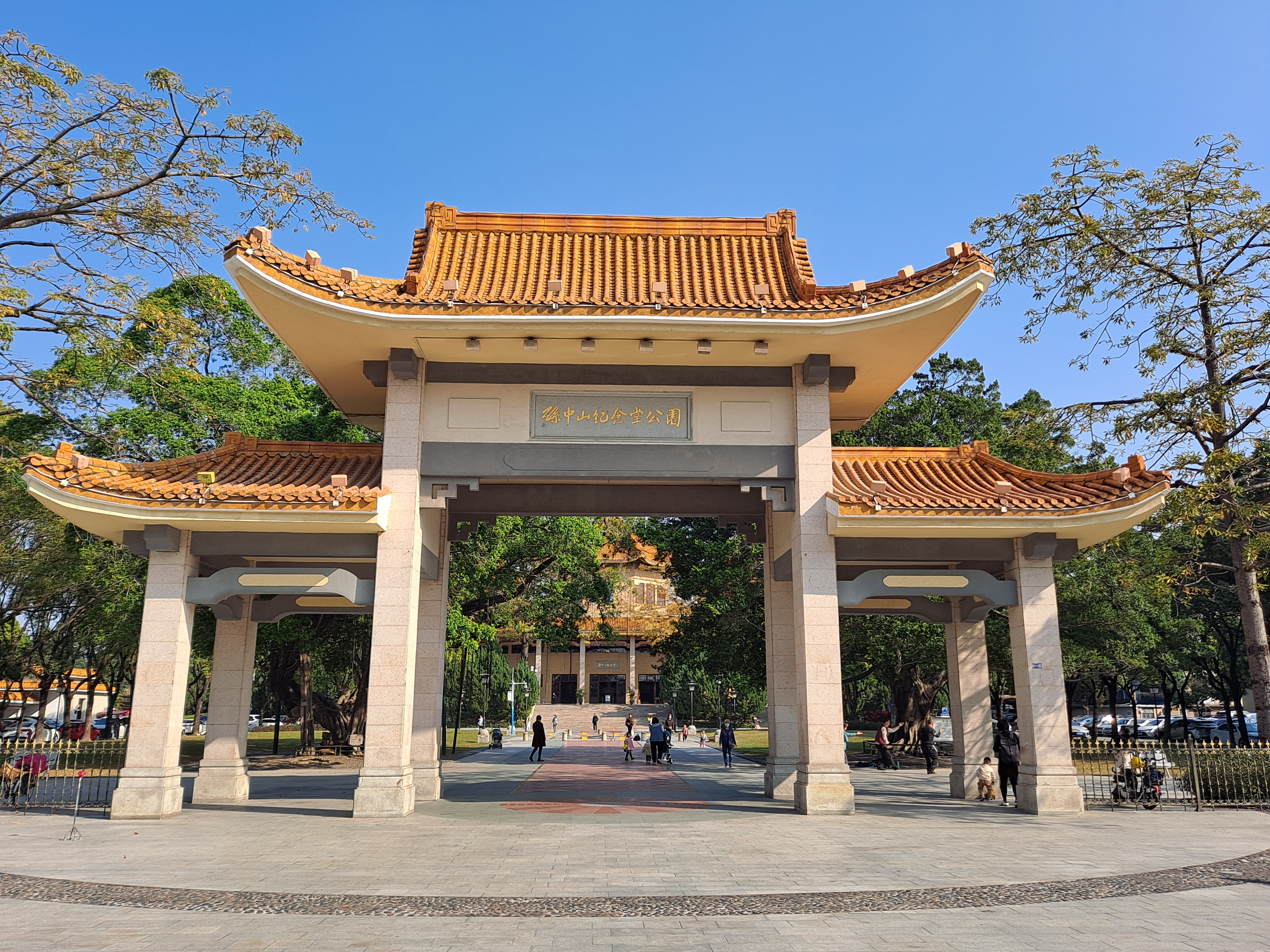
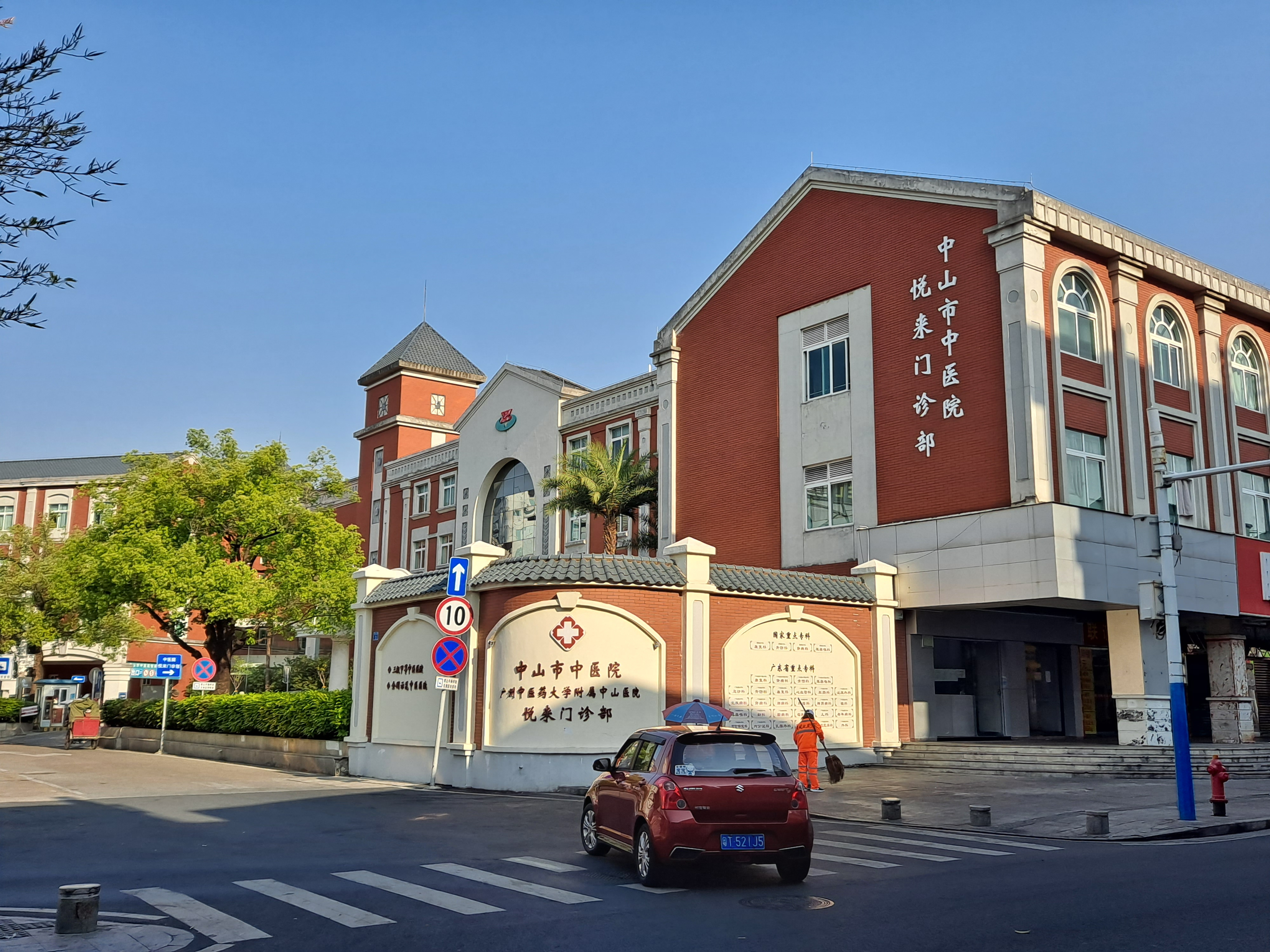
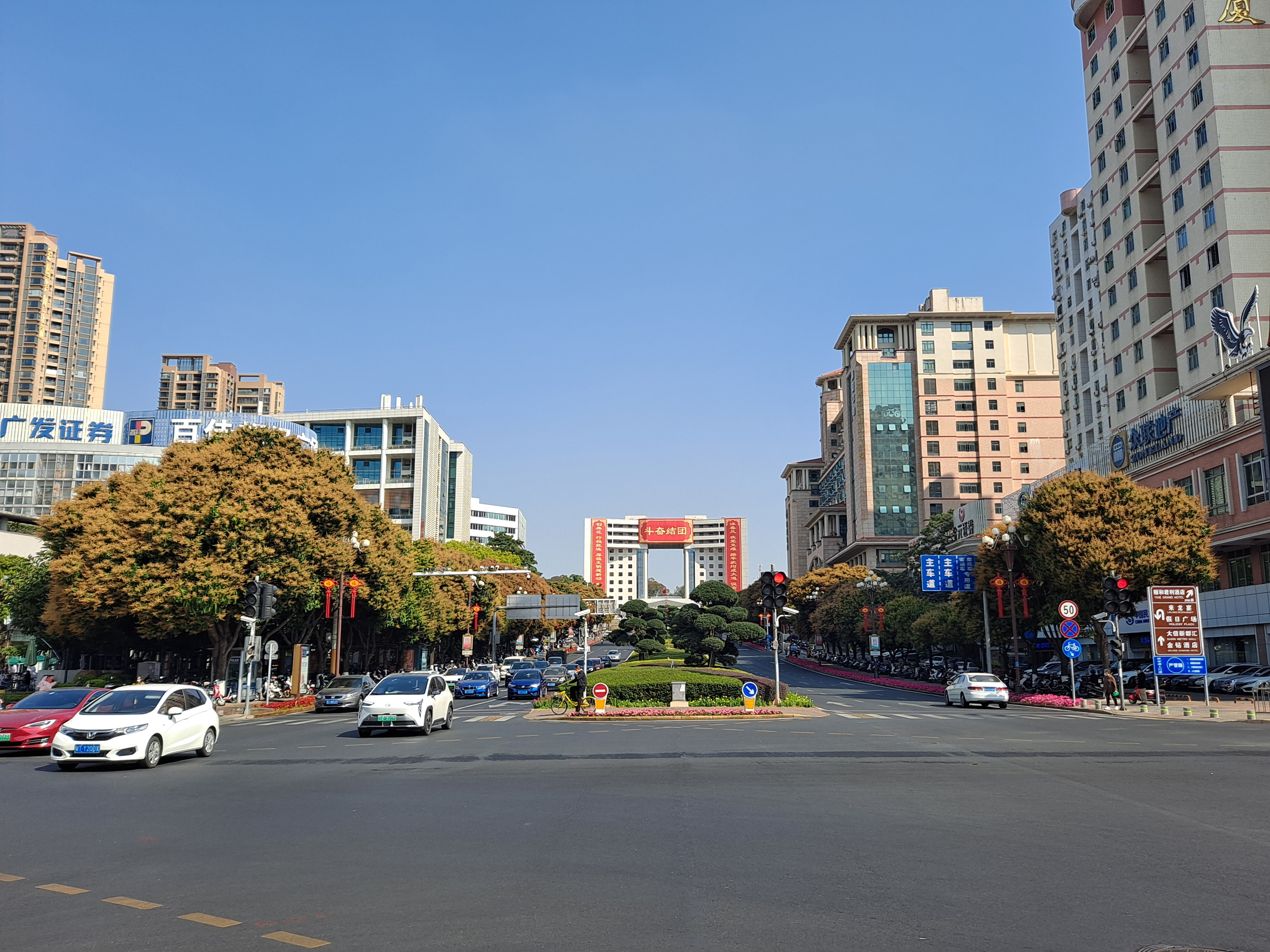

- Location of Zhongshan in Guangdong

- Location in Guangdong Zhongshan (China)
- Coordinates (Zhongshan municipal government): 22°31′01″N 113°23′33″E
- Country: People's Republic of China
- Province: Guangdong
- County-level divisions: None
- Township-level divisions: 5 districts; 18 towns; 1 development zone
- Municipal seat: Dongqu Subdistrict

Government
  - CCP Committee Secretary: Yin Nianhong (尹念红)
  - Mayor: Yin Nianhong (尹念红)

Area
  - Prefecture-level city: 1,783.67 km^{2} (688.68 sq mi)
  - Urban: 1,783.67 km^{2} (688.68 sq mi)
  - Metro: 19,870.4 km^{2} (7,672.0 sq mi)
- Elevation: 11 m (36 ft)

Population (2020 census)
  - Prefecture-level city: 4,418,060
  - Density: 2,476.95/km^{2} (6,415.27/sq mi)
  - Urban: 4,418,060
  - Urban density: 2,476.95/km^{2} (6,415.27/sq mi)
  - Metro: 65,565,622
  - Metro density: 3,299.66/km^{2} (8,546.09/sq mi)

GDP (2025)
  - Prefecture-level city: CN¥ 426.056 billion US$ 61.77 billion
  - Per capita: CN¥ 80,157; US$ 12,425
- Time zone: UTC+8 (China Standard Time)
- Postal code: 528400
- Area code: 0760
- ISO 3166 code: CN-GD-20
- License plate prefixes: 粤T
- City flower: Chrysanthemum
- Website: www.zhongshan.gov.cn (Chinese)

Zhongshan
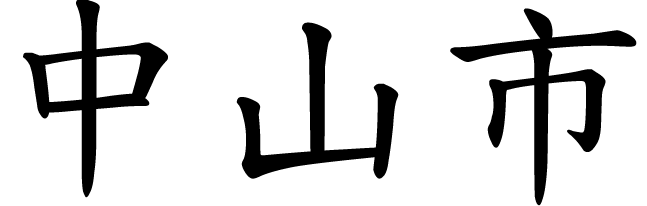
- "Zhongshan City", as written in Chinese
- Chinese: 中山
- Postal: Chungshan
- Literal meaning: 'Sun Yat-sen City'
Transcriptions
Standard Mandarin
- Hanyu Pinyin: Zhōngshān
- Bopomofo: ㄓㄨㄥ ㄕㄢ
- Wade–Giles: Chung^{1}-shan^{1}
- IPA: [ʈʂʊ́ŋ.ʂán]
Hakka
- Pha̍k-fa-sṳ: Chûng-sân
Yue: Cantonese
- Yale Romanization: Jūngsāan
- Jyutping: Zung1 Saan1
- IPA: [tsʊŋ˥.san˥]
Southern Min
- Hokkien POJ: Tiong-san

Former name
- Chinese: 香山
- Literal meaning: 'Fragrant Mountain'
Transcriptions
Standard Mandarin
- Hanyu Pinyin: Xiāngshān
- Bopomofo: ㄒㄧㄤ ㄕㄢ
- Wade–Giles: Hsiang^{1}-shan^{1}
- IPA: [ɕjáŋ.ʂán]
Hakka
- Pha̍k-fa-sṳ: Hiông-sân
Yue: Cantonese
- Yale Romanization: Hēungsāan
- Jyutping: Hoeng1 Saan1
- IPA: [hœŋ˥.san˥]
Southern Min
- Hokkien POJ: Hiong-san

Zhongshan (Chinese: 中山 [ʈʂʊ́ŋ ʂán]), alternately romanized via Cantonese as Chungshan or Jungsaan, is a prefecture-level city in the south of the Pearl River Delta in Guangdong province, China. As of the 2020 census, the whole city with 4,418,060 inhabitants is now part of the Guangzhou–Shenzhen conurbation with 65,565,622 inhabitants. The city-core subdistricts used to be called Shiqi or Shekki (Chinese: 石岐).

Zhongshan is one of the few Chinese cities to be named after a person. It was originally named Xiangshan (香山, "Fragrant Mountain"; Cantonese: Heung-saan), but was renamed in 1925 in honor of Sun Yat-sen, who is known in China as "Sun Zhongshan". Sun, a local of the area, was the founding father of the Republic of China who is also regarded positively by the People's Republic.

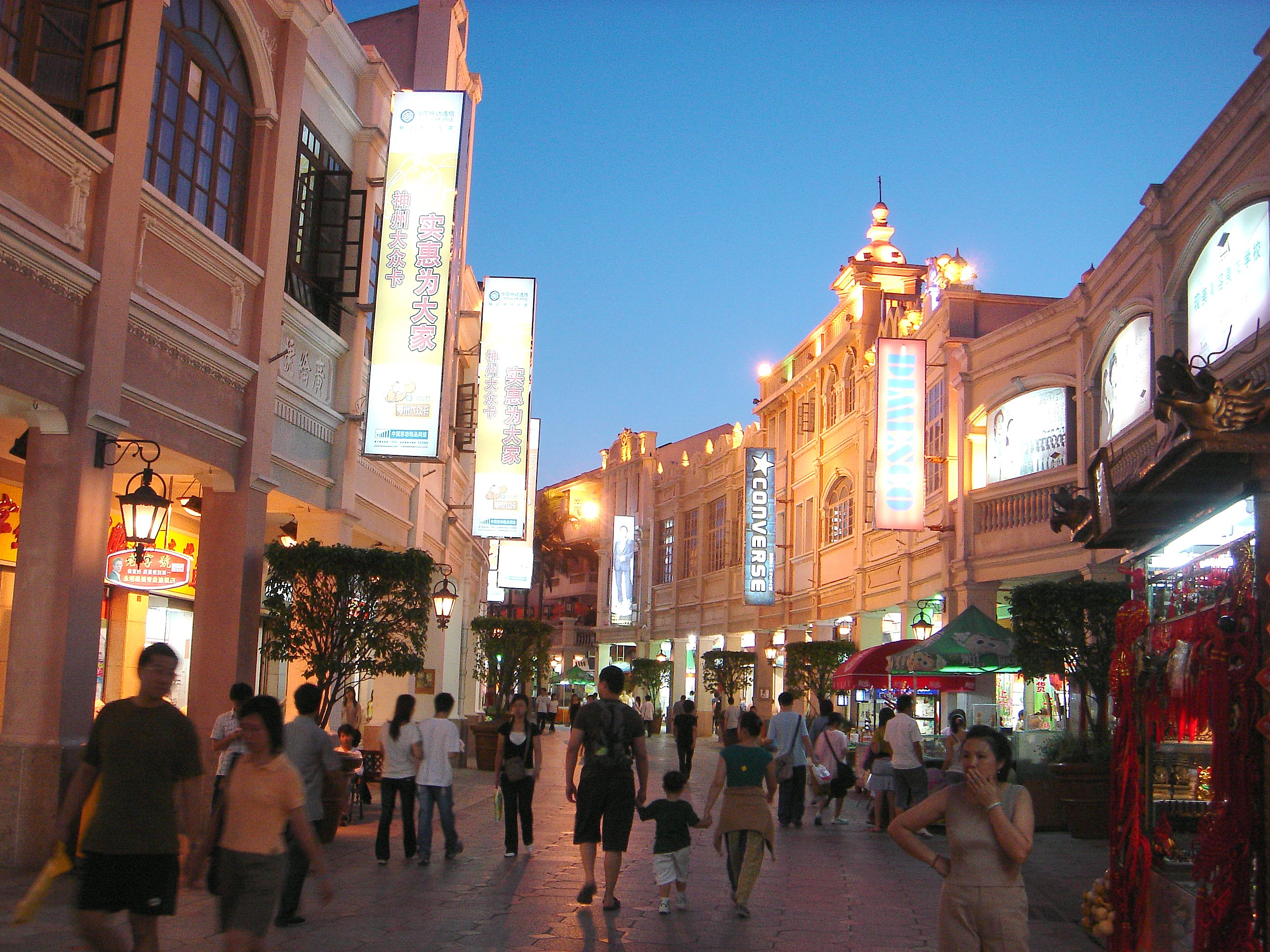
Sunwen Lu (Road) West at dusk.

== Names ==
Until 1925, Zhongshan was generally known as Xiangshan or Heung-san (Siangshan; Chinese: 香山; lit. 'Fragrant Mountain'), in reference to the many flowers that grew in the mountains nearby. The city was renamed in honor of Sun Yat-sen, who had adopted the name Zhongshan. Sun is considered by both the People's Republic of China and the Republic of China to be the "Father of Modern China", and was from Cuiheng village – now part of Nanlang Town in Zhongshan.

== History ==
Thousands of years ago, much of the Zhongshan area lay within the Pearl River estuary, with only scattered islands above the surface. Gradually from south to north, the area filled in with alluvial silt and became dry land. The northern parts of today's Zhongshan did not fill in until the time of the Ming dynasty.

The Zhongshan area was part of an extended Dongguan County during the Tang dynasty (618–907 AD), and was a significant sea salt producer. In 1082, during the Northern Song dynasty, a fortified settlement called Xiangshan was founded in the area, marking the first official use of the name by which it would be known throughout most of its modern history. The prosperous settlement was then upgraded to a county in 1152. After the collapse of the Southern Song dynasty, many descendants of Song court officials, including members of the imperial family, settled in Xiangshan. Significant land formation in the area of Zhongshan occurred since the Ming dynasty. Under the Qing dynasty, embankments were built to prevent flooding in the new alluvial lands, and the area of cultivation was extended.

Much of the First Opium War took place in and around Xiangshan. In 1839, the official Lin Zexu arrived in Xiangshan and ordered the expulsion of Sir Charles Elliot and other British traders from the area. Qing dynasty soldiers resisted British attacks on the area in 1840, but were ultimately overwhelmed.

After the Opium Wars opened the region to foreign influence, a number of Xiangshan residents, including Sun Zhongshan (Yatsen), left to study overseas and were among the creators of modern China. Xiangshan was one of the first counties in China liberated as part of the Xinhai Revolution. After Sun Zhongshan's death in 1925, the commander-in-chief of the armed forces of the Republic of China decided to memorialize Sun by renaming his county of birth from Xiangshan to Zhongshan.

Nationalist and Communist units launched guerrilla attacks on Japanese occupancy forces and their Collaborators beginning in 1942. On August 15, 1945, Japanese forces declared an unconditional surrender, and Zhongshan was liberated.

Zhongshan was the scene of fighting during the Chinese Civil War and was held for much of the war by Nationalists. On October 30, 1949, however, the People's Liberation Army defeated Nationalist forces in Zhongshan, and the county came under the control of the People's Republic of China.

In 1983, Zhongshan was elevated in administrative status from a county to a county-level city under the administration of Foshan. In 1988 Zhongshan became a prefecture-level city.

== Geography ==
Zhongshan is located along the west side of the mouth of the Pearl River, directly opposite Shenzhen and Hong Kong. It is slightly south of the Tropic of Cancer. It lies south of Guangzhou and Foshan and north of Zhuhai and Macau. The northern part of Zhongshan, including most of the urbanized area, lies on the alluvial plains of the Pearl River Delta, while the southern part of the city's territory reaches into a range of coastal hills.

The most notable of these are the Wugui Hills (Chinese: 五桂山; pinyin: Wǔguī Shān; Jyutping: Ng^{5}gwai^{3} Saan^{1}). The city's current geography is typical of southern China: numerous steep mountains and hills with alluvial plains in between down to the coastline. The main summit of the Wugui Hills is the highest point in the city, at 531 metres (1,742 ft) above sea level.

=== Climate ===
Like nearly all of southern China, Zhongshan's climate is warm and humid most of the year, with an average temperature of 22 °C (72 °F) and 175 centimetres (69 in) of rainfall each year. According to the Köppen climate classification, it has a humid subtropical climate. Southern China experiences fairly frequent typhoons and thunderstorms, and most rain falls between April and September.

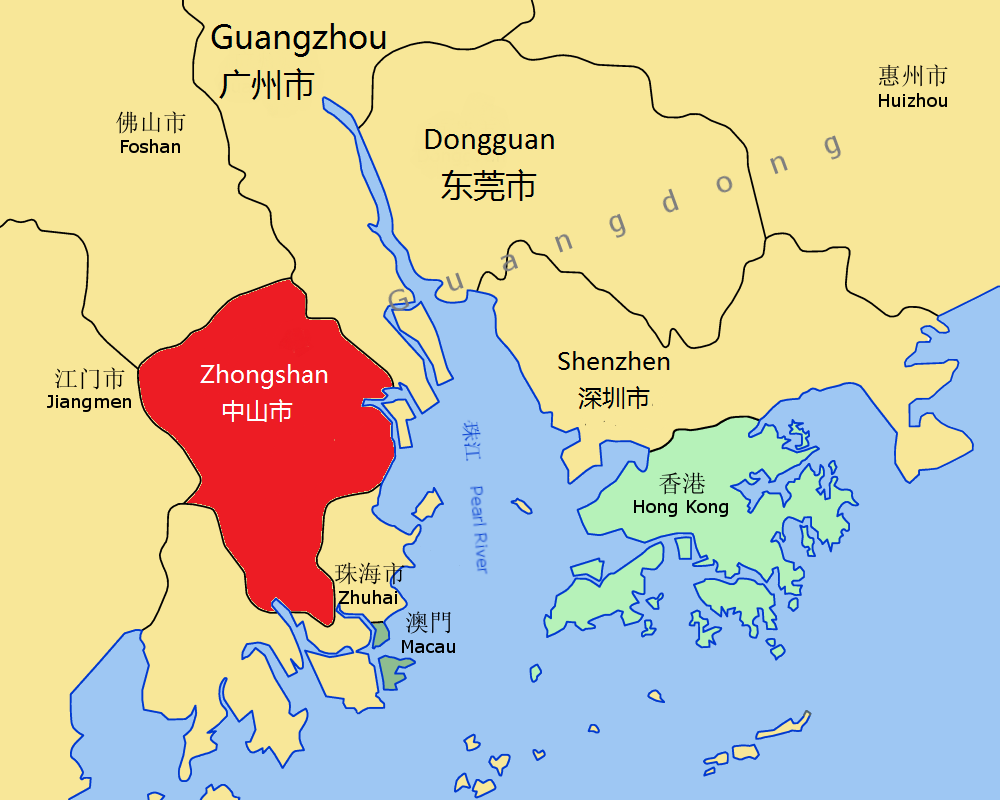
Zhongshan's location in the Pearl River Delta.

Climate data for Zhongshan, elevation 34 m (112 ft), (1991–2020 normals, extremes 1955–present)
Month	Jan	Feb	Mar	Apr	May	Jun	Jul	Aug	Sep	Oct	Nov	Dec	Year
Record high °C (°F)	29.1 (84.4)	29.6 (85.3)	31.6 (88.9)	33.7 (92.7)	37.2 (99.0)	37.4 (99.3)	39.1 (102.4)	38 (100)	36.2 (97.2)	35.7 (96.3)	32.7 (90.9)	30.9 (87.6)	39.1 (102.4)
Mean daily maximum °C (°F)	18.8 (65.8)	20.2 (68.4)	22.8 (73.0)	26.7 (80.1)	30.1 (86.2)	31.9 (89.4)	33.0 (91.4)	32.8 (91.0)	31.6 (88.9)	29.0 (84.2)	25.1 (77.2)	20.6 (69.1)	26.9 (80.4)
Daily mean °C (°F)	14.6 (58.3)	16.2 (61.2)	19.0 (66.2)	23.1 (73.6)	26.4 (79.5)	28.3 (82.9)	29.0 (84.2)	28.7 (83.7)	27.7 (81.9)	25.0 (77.0)	20.9 (69.6)	16.3 (61.3)	22.9 (73.3)
Mean daily minimum °C (°F)	11.7 (53.1)	13.5 (56.3)	16.4 (61.5)	20.4 (68.7)	23.8 (74.8)	25.7 (78.3)	26.2 (79.2)	25.9 (78.6)	24.9 (76.8)	22.0 (71.6)	17.8 (64.0)	13.3 (55.9)	20.1 (68.2)
Record low °C (°F)	−1.3 (29.7)	2.8 (37.0)	3.4 (38.1)	11.0 (51.8)	15.1 (59.2)	18.3 (64.9)	21.4 (70.5)	21.5 (70.7)	17.7 (63.9)	10.6 (51.1)	5.3 (41.5)	1.9 (35.4)	−1.3 (29.7)
Average precipitation mm (inches)	45.3 (1.78)	46.0 (1.81)	76.3 (3.00)	167.6 (6.60)	266.3 (10.48)	358.6 (14.12)	264.4 (10.41)	310.8 (12.24)	236.9 (9.33)	72.9 (2.87)	45.5 (1.79)	37.4 (1.47)	1,928 (75.9)
Average precipitation days (≥ 0.1 mm)	6.9	9.5	12.8	13.6	15.5	19.0	16.7	17.3	13.0	6.7	5.6	5.7	142.3
Average relative humidity (%)	74	78	81	81	81	82	80	81	77	72	72	69	77
Mean monthly sunshine hours	117.9	88.4	76.5	100.2	145.3	171.0	215.1	188.6	172.6	182.3	155.8	142.9	1,756.6
Percentage possible sunshine	35	27	20	26	35	42	52	48	47	51	47	43	39
Source: China Meteorological Administrationall-time February highall-time October record

== Cityscape ==
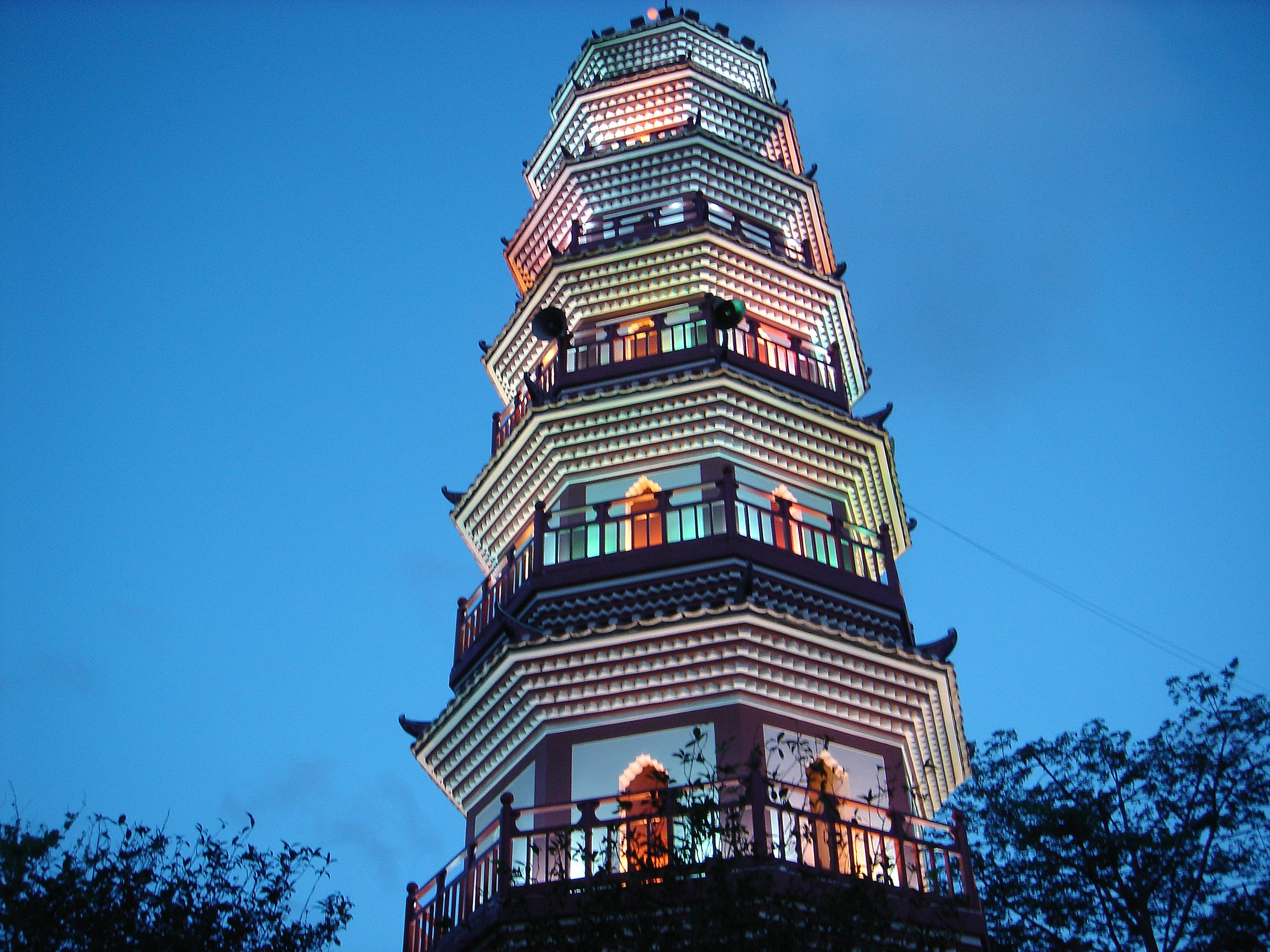
Fufeng pagoda in Zhongshan Park.

Zhongshan is a city of numerous leafy parks, wide boulevards, and monuments. Notable sights include:

- Sunwen Road West (or Sunwen Xilu) in Zhongshan Old Town, a pedestrian mall lined with dozens of restored buildings from the colonial period in treaty port style. Several of these buildings were built in the 1920s.
- The seven-story Fufeng Pagoda, built in 1608 and visible from all over the city, is on a hill in Zhongshan Park, which abuts the western end of Sunwen Road West immediately to its north. A Sun Yat-sen memorial pavilion stands near the pagoda.
- Sunwen Memorial Park, at the southern end of Xingzhong Road, is the site of the largest bronze sculpture of Sun Yat-sen in the world.

Zhongshan, like many cities in China, has a rapidly changing cityscape with many new buildings under construction. Currently, the tallest completed buildings in the city are the two Zhongshan International Finance Center Towers. Tower 1 and Tower 2 both reach a height of 220 meters (720 feet) and are 55 stories tall. These will be eclipsed by the Perfect Eagle Golden Square tower, which will reach 238 meters (781 feet), with an expected completion date in 2018. The International Trade Center in Guzhen Town, expected to be completed in 2019, will reach a height of 305 meters (1,001 feet) with 65 floors.

== Administration ==
Zhongshan is a prefecture-level city of the Guangdong province. An uncommon administrative feature is that it has no county-level division, but the municipal government does group the 24 township-level divisions into five district areas. The city government directly administers 8 Subdistricts and 15 towns:

Map
Name	Simplified Chinese	Hanyu Pinyin	Population (2010 census)	Area (km^{2})	Density (/km^{2})	Division code	Residential communities	Administrative villages
Zhongxin Area	中心片区	Zhōngxīn Piànqū	877,666	456.7	1,921.75	—	5 subdistricts, 3 towns	
Shiqi Subdistrict	石岐街道	Shíqí Jiēdào	206,362	26.0	7,937.00	442000001	19	
Dongqu Subdistrict	东区街道	Dōngqū Jiēdào	153,477	72.0	2,131.62	442000002	10	
Xiqu Subdistrict	西区街道	Xiqū Jiēdào	97,864	26.7	3,665.31	442000004	9	
Nanqu Subdistrict	南区街道	Nánqū Jiēdào	64,548	48.0	1,344.75	442000005	10	
Wuguishan Subdistrict	五桂山街道	Wǔguìshān Jiēdào	48,019	113.0	424.94	442000006	1	4
Shaxi town	沙溪镇	Shāxī Zhèn	119,372	55.0	2,170.40	442000106	1	15
Gangkou town	港口镇	Gǎngkǒu Zhèn	113,748	70.5	1,613.44	442000108	7	2
Dachong town	大涌镇	Dàyǒng Zhèn	74,276	45.5	1,632.43	442000116	6	2
Dongbu Area	东部片区	Dōngbù Piànqū	337,974	296.0	1,141.80	—	2 subdistricts, 1 new area	
Zhongshangang Subdistrict	中山港街道	Zhōngshāngǎng Jiēdào	229,997	90.0	2,555.52	442000003	7	
Nanlang Subdistrict	南朗街道	Nánlǎng Jiēdào	107,977	206.0	524.16	442000113	2	13
Cuiheng New Area	翠亨新区	Cuíhēng Xīnqū				—		
Dongbei Area	东北片区	Dōngběi Piànqū	375,204	281.3	1,333.82	—	1 Subdistrict, 2 towns	
Minzhong Subdistrict	民众街道	Mínzhòng Jiēdào	108,417	125.4	864.56	442000102	3	16
Huangpu town	黄圃镇	Huángpǔ Zhèn	145,017	83.6	1,734.65	442000101	4	12
Sanjiao town	三角镇	Sānjiǎo Zhèn	121,770	72.3	1,684.23	442000109	1	7
Xibei Area	西北片区	Xīběi Piànqū	996,097	397.7	2,504.64	—	6 towns	
Xiaolan town	小榄镇	Xiǎolǎn Zhèn	433,678	152.1	2,851.26	442000100	23	6
Dongfeng town	东凤镇	Dōngfèng Zhèn	123,562	54.8	2,254.78	442000103	4	10
Guzhen town	古镇镇	Gǔzhèn Zhèn	147,440	47.8	3,084.51	442000105	1	12
Henglan town	横栏镇	Hénglán Zhèn	103,135	76.0	1,357.03	442000110	1	10
Nantou town	南头镇	Nántóu Zhèn	130,712	30.0	4,357.06	442000111	6	
Fusha town	阜沙镇	Fùshā Zhèn	57,570	37.0	1,555.94	442000112	1	8
Nanbu Area	南部片区	Nánbù Piànqū	533,944	370.6	1,440.75	—	4 towns	
Tanzhou town	坦洲镇	Tǎnzhōu Zhèn	219,943	136.0	1,617.22	442000107	7	7
Sanxiang town	三乡镇	Sānxiāng Zhèn	200,197	93.6	2,138.85	442000114	3	12
Banfu town	板芙镇	Bǎnfú Zhèn	82,412	82.0	1,005.02	442000115	1	10
Shenwan town	神湾镇	Shénwān Zhèn	31,392	59.0	532.06	442000117	1	5

Administrative divisions of Zhongshan
Division code	English name	Chinese	Pinyin	Area in km^{2}	Population 2010	Seat	Postal code	Divisions			
Division code	English name	Chinese	Pinyin	Area in km^{2}	Population 2010	Seat	Postal code	Subdistricts	Towns	Residential communities	Administrative villages
442000	Zhongshan City	中山市	Zhōngshān Shì	1,783.67	3,121,275	City-administered District	528400	6	18	128	151
442000	City-administered District	市辖区	Shìxiáqū	1,783.67	3,121,275	Dongqu Subdistrict	528400	6	18	128	151

- Cuiheng New Area (翠亨新区)

== Language ==
Although the main ethnic group in Zhongshan is Han Chinese, there is no one dominant language or dialect spoken making Zhongshan one of the most diverse cities in China. Dialects spoken in the city ranging from the more common Yue, Hakka, and Min dialects to the more local Shiqi, Shatian, Longdu, Nanlang, Sanxiang, Guzhen, Sanjiao, and Zhangjiabian dialects as well as Wuiguishan, the only Hakka dialect in the city. The most common language, however, is Cantonese.

=== Yue ===
- Shiqi dialect – Shiqiqu Subdistrict, Dongqu Subdistrict, Nanqu Subdistrict
- Shatian dialect – Xiqu Subdistrict, Tanzhou Town, Shenwan Town, Banfu Town, Henglan Town, Xiaolan Town, Dongfeng Town, Nantou Town, Huangpu Town, Minzhong Town, Gangkou Town, Fusha Town, Dongsheng Town
- Guzhen dialect – Guzhen Town
- Sanjiao dialect – Sanjiao Town

=== Min ===
- Nanlang dialect – Nanlang Town
- Sanxiang dialect – Sanxiang Town
- Longdu dialect – Dachong Town, Shaxi Town
- Zhangjiabian dialect – THIDZ Subdistrict

=== Hakka ===
- Wuguishan dialect – Wuguishan Subdistrict

== Economy ==
=== Primary industries ===
Primary productions are agricultural, such as rice, lychee, banana, and sugar cane. Added to this, horticulture in Xiaolan Town is famous throughout southern China for its blooming chrysanthemum and chickens.

=== Manufacturing industries ===
Zhongshan, Dongguan, Nanhai, and Shunde are dubbed the 'Four Little Tigers' in Guangdong. The proximity of Zhongshan to Hong Kong and Macau is an advantage to its economic development, especially in manufacturing.

In the 1980s, Zhongshan had a relatively developed state-owned enterprise (SOE) sector that was used to stimulate Township and Village Enterprises (TVE) development in the countryside. Currently, the SOE sector is much weaker, and the economy is dominated by foreign investment and TVEs, and by specialized 'manufacturing towns'. Each of these towns specializes in making a particular product. Most of the towns have earned a reputation as leading manufacturers in their pillar industries.

These specialized manufacturing towns include:

- Dachong Town for mahogany furniture
- Dongfeng Town for electric household appliances
- Guzhen Town for lighting fixtures
- Huangpu Town for food processing
- Shaxi Town for casual wear manufacturing
- Xiaolan Town for locks and hardware, as well as for electronic acoustics products

The government of Zhongshan encourages "Research and Design" in the region by setting up national level research centres and specialized industrial regions. For example, the Zhongshan National Torch High-Tech Industrial Development Zone (中山国家级火炬高技术产业开发区) was established in 1990 in the east of the city by the Ministry of Science and Technology and the governments of Guangdong province and Zhongshan. Zhongshan Port, which ranks among the top 10 ports nationwide in container-handling capacity, is in the zone. Since 2001, it has included the Zhongshan Electronic Base of China (中国电子中山基地) for its reputation in the electronic acoustics industry. Following possible development in Nansha, the city considers its eastern part, of which 400 square kilometres (154 square miles) of land is available, a focus of future development.

Currently, the city is trying to re-organize its fragmented industrialization. Meanwhile, the light and labour-intensive industry characteristic of the local economy faces the problem of a shortage of land in Zhongshan.

== Food ==
The city is known for Sanxiang noodles that are made of glutinous rice. The dish has a history of more than 200 years.

== Tourism, recreation and leisure ==
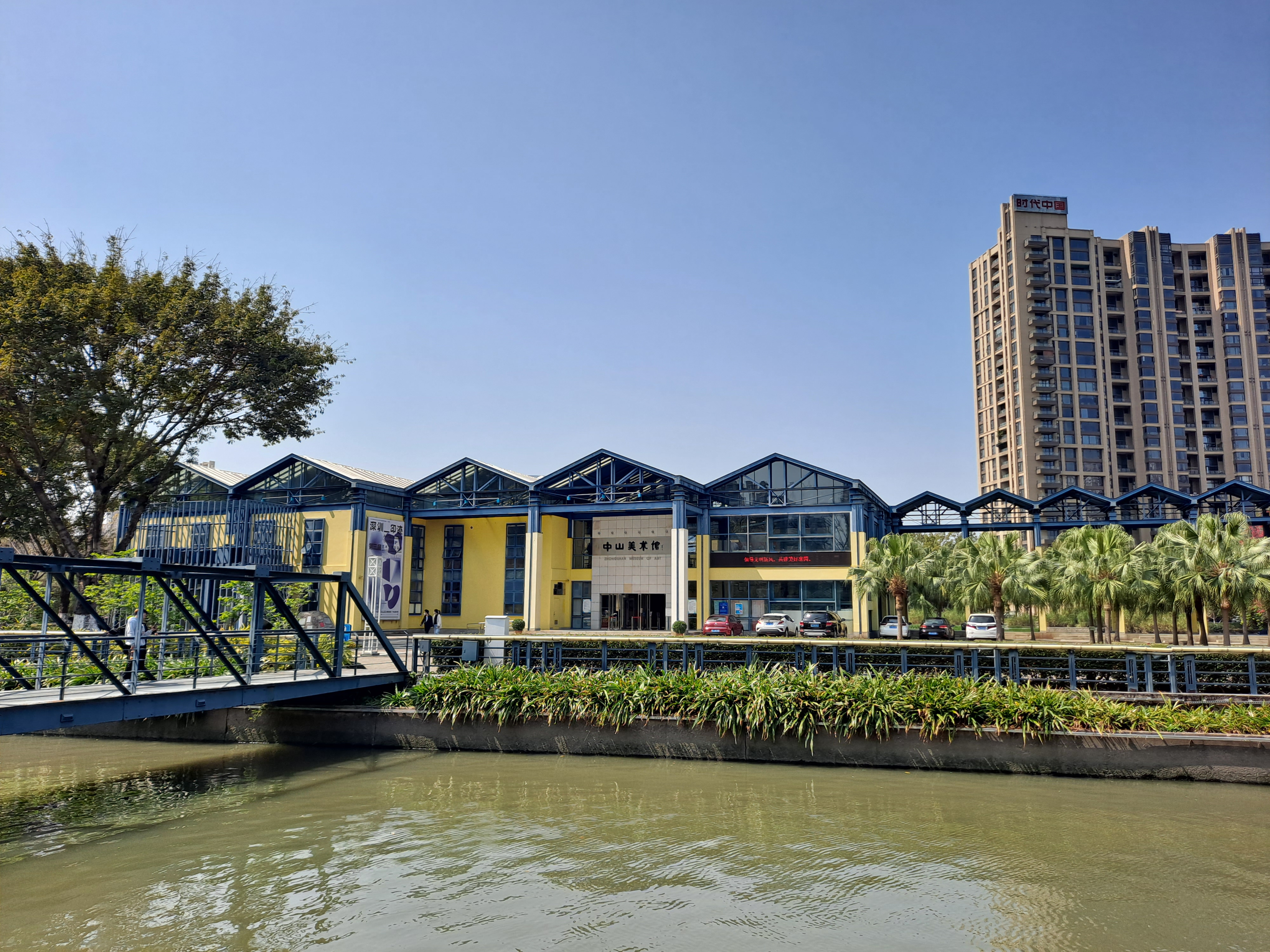
Zhongshan Museum of Art

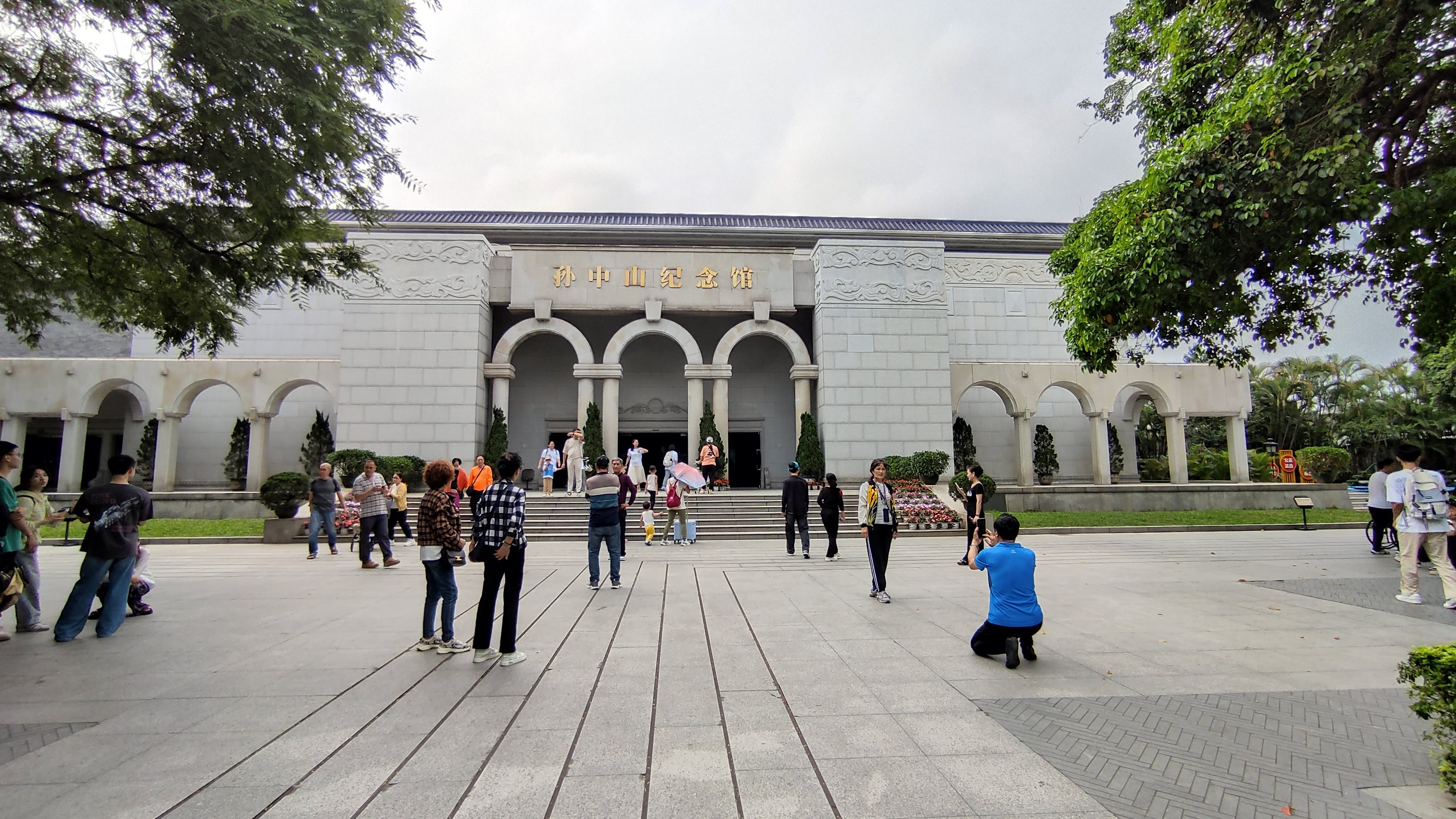
The Museum of Dr. Sun Yat-sen, Zhongshan

- Two natural hot spring resorts are located in Sanxiang Town, such as the state-owned Zhongshan Hot Springs Resort, which sits upon a rare hot spring reservoir in the Pearl River Delta.
- Former Residence of Sun Yat-sen Memorial Museum: The former residence of Sun Zhongshan is at the center of the Memorial Museum, located in the village of Cuiheng.
- Xiaolan: Many houses in the town of Xiaolan have garden pavilions dedicated to the cultivation of chrysanthemums. Roofs and balconies, streets and lanes feature countless varieties of chrysanthemum plantings.

Zhongshan is home to a number of forest parks which are designed to protect the natural features of the land and offer visitors a chance to get closer to nature. Zhongshan Tianxin Forest Park (中山田心森林公园) was opened in 2015 as part of the city's "green lung" initiative.

== Education ==
=== Colleges and universities ===
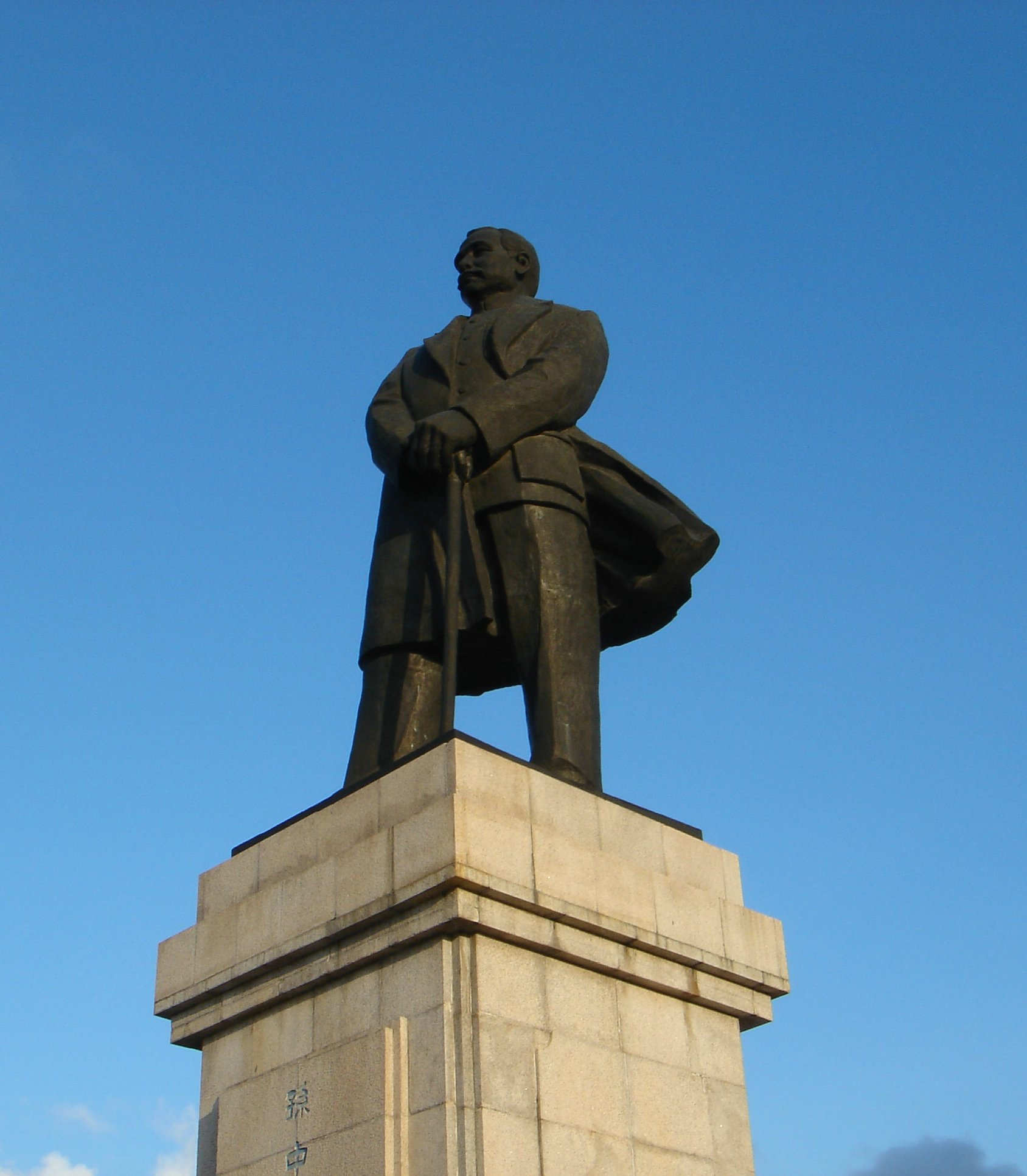
Statue of Sun Yat-sen in Sunwen Memorial Park.

- Guangdong Pharmaceutical University (Zhongshan Campus)
- University of Electronic Science and Technology
- Guangdong Polytechnic Institute (Zhongshan Campus)
- Zhongshan Polytechnic
- Zhongshan Torch Polytechnic

=== High schools and institutions ===
- Zhongshan Overseas Chinese Middle School (Chinese: 中山市华侨中学) opened in 1954 (Mr. Chen Maoyuan, a returned overseas Chinese, initiated the establishment of the school), is one of the first top-grade schools of Guangdong Province (省一级学校) and the first national demonstrative ordinary high schools (国家级示范性普通高中).
- Sun Yat-sen Memorial Secondary School (中山纪念中学; Zhōngshān Jìniàn Zhōngxúe) was established in memory of Sun Yat-sen in 1934, and was built under the supervision of Soong Ching-ling, the widow of Sun Yat-sen.
- Zhongshan No. 1 Middle School (中山市第一中学; Zhōngshānshì Dìyī Zhōngxúe) opened in 1908.
- Guangdong Zhongshan Experimental Middle School
- Zhongshan Guishan Middle School
- Guangdong Bowen International School
- Sanxin Bilingual School
- China-Hong Kong English School

== Notable people ==
- Nat Wei, Baron Wei (韋鳴恩), British politician and social entrepreneur of Chinese descent (ancestral home)
- Li Kuen-pei (李焜培), artist
- Sun Yat-sen (孫中山), statesman and political philosopher, first leader of the Kuomintang; served as the provisional first president of the Republic of China
- Siu Kwok-kin (Chinese: 蕭國健; pinyin: Xiao Guojian), professor, department of Chinese Literature and director of Hong Kong Historical and Cultural Research Center at Zhuhai College, (Jilin University); Honorary Fellow of the Royal Asiatic Society Hong Kong; museums consultant for the Hong Kong Leisure and Cultural Services Department
- Cheng Chung-tai (鄭松泰), Hong Kong academic, social activist, and politician
- Su Bingtian (苏炳添), Chinese athlete, fastest Asian sprinter of all-time
- Dr Manying Ip( 葉宋曼瑛教授 )： Dr Ip is the professor of Asian Studies, Auckland University, New Zealand, she is a specialist of history of Chinese New Zealanders.

== Transportation ==
=== Public buses ===
Zhongshan Public Transport Group Co., Ltd. operates many bus routes throughout the city. Stop announcements are voiced in Mandarin and Cantonese on all buses. On BRT system buses, announcements are also voiced in English. By purchasing a Zhongshan Tong card from authorized retailers, riders can receive a discount of 50% on all bus rides. Elderly citizens are allowed to ride for free.

=== Ferry transport ===
Chu Kong Passenger Transport (CKS) connects Zhongshan with Hong Kong with multiple daily scheduled high-speed ferry services to both Hong Kong–Macau Ferry Terminal on Hong Kong Island and Hong Kong China Ferry Terminal in Kowloon. The trip by ferry takes about 1.5 hours.

=== Railway ===
Guangzhou–Zhuhai Intercity Railway serves the city of Zhongshan with seven stations.

=== Metro ===
The Zhongshan Metro system is currently under planning with 2 lines. The Nansha–Zhuhai (Zhongshan) Intercity Railway will serve Zhongshan upon completion with nine stations located in the city.

=== Aviation ===
There is a bus service from Zhongshan to Shenzhen Bao'an International Airport in Shenzhen.

Additionally Zhongshan is served by Hong Kong International Airport; ticketed passengers can take ferries from the Zhongshan Ferry Terminal to the HKIA Skypier. There are also coach bus services connecting Zhongshan with HKIA.

=== Major projects ===
- The Shenzhen-Zhongshan Bridge connects Zhongshan with the city of Shenzhen on the Eastern side of the Pearl River Delta. It consists of a series of bridges and tunnels, starting from Bao'an International Airport on the Shenzhen side. Construction of the 51 km (32 mi) eight-lane link started in 2017, with completion in 2024.

== Twin towns – sister cities ==
Zhongshan has seven sister cities:

- Burnaby, British Columbia, Canada (2011)
- Puntarenas, Costa Rica
- Culiacán, Mexico
- Cairns, Australia
- Alameda County, California, United States
- Honolulu, Hawaii, United States (1997)
- Moriguchi, Osaka, Japan (1998)
