= Xiaolan =

Xiaolan 小榄镇
- Town
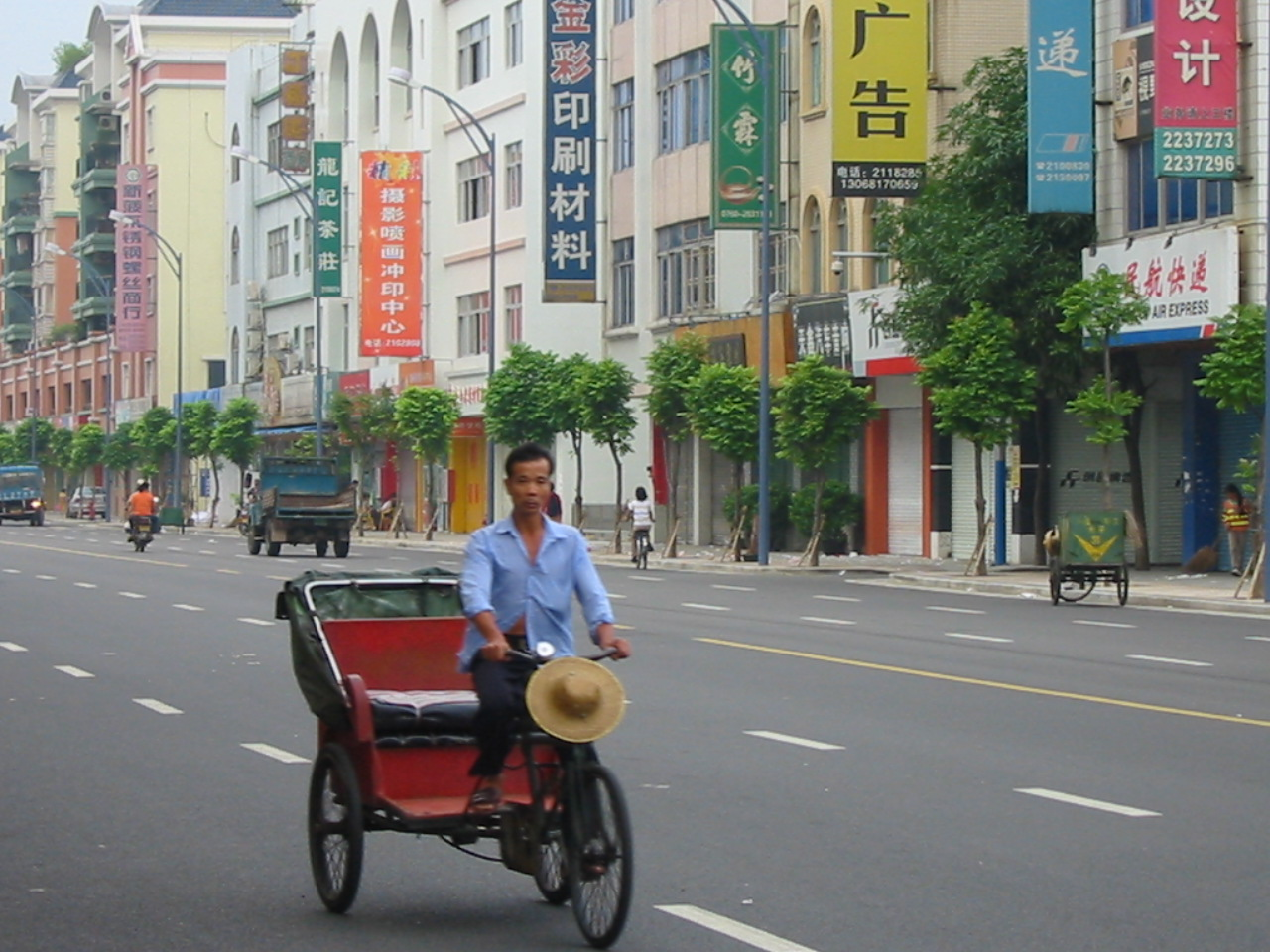
- Nickname: Chrysanthemum City (菊城)
- Xiaolan is labeled '16' on this map of Zhongshan

- Location in Guangdong
- Coordinates: 22°40′20″N 113°15′03″E
- Country: People's Republic of China
- Province: Guangdong
- Prefecture-level city: Zhongshan

Area
  - Total: 71.47 km^{2} (27.59 sq mi)

Population (2020)
  - Total: 513,726
  - Density: 7,188/km^{2} (18,620/sq mi)
- Time zone: UTC+8 (China Standard)

Xiaolan
- Traditional Chinese: 小欖
- Simplified Chinese: 小榄
- Postal: Siulam
Transcriptions
Standard Mandarin
- Hanyu Pinyin: Xǐaolǎn
- Wade–Giles: Hsiao^{3}-lan^{3}
Yue: Cantonese
- Jyutping: Siu2 Laam5

Xiaolan (simplified Chinese: 小榄镇; traditional Chinese: 小欖鎮; pinyin: Xiǎolǎn Zhèn; Jyutping: Siu2 Laam5 Zan3) is a town situated at the northwest periphery of the city of Zhongshan, Guangdong Province, China.

Per a 2020 publication by the Zhongshan government, Xiaolan has approximately 333,000 permanent residents, but has just 181,988 registered hukou residents as of 2018. The town spans an area of 71.47 square kilometres (27.59 mi^{2}).

== History ==
According to some historical imperial records, a concubine of emperor Song Duzong of the Southern Song dynasty, eloped from the palace to pursue her true love. The concubine fled south until she finally arrived in Xiaolan, where she was able to lose the imperial guards who were in pursuit of her. When she arrived in Xiaolan, the concubine and her helpers were so attracted to the area's landscape, which was scattered with yellow chrysanthemum flowers, that they decided to take up residence there.

In June 2010, a strike broke out at a Honda Lock plant in Xiaolan, with workers demanded a wage increase from 930 RMB per month to 1,600 RMB per month. Reuters reported that striking workers were intimidated by police forces, and published an image which appeared to depict riot police being deployed near the factory on June 11. In response, the plant's managers began hiring scabs in response to the strike, and offered monthly pay increases of 200 RMB. By July 2010, many of the plant's striking workers returned for such pay rise, while others quit in search of work elsewhere.

== Administrative divisions ==
As of 2020, Xiaolan is divided into 15 residential communities.

- Shakou Community (Chinese: 沙口社区)
- Xinshi Community (Chinese: 新市社区)
- Dongqu Community (Chinese: 东区社区)
- Jixi Community (Chinese: 绩西社区)
- Beiqu Community (Chinese: 北区社区)
- Zhuyuan Community (Chinese: 竹源社区)
- Jidong First Community (Chinese: 绩东一社区)
- Jidong Second Community (Chinese: 绩东二社区)
- Shengfeng Community (Chinese: 盛丰社区)
- Baofeng Community (Chinese: 宝丰社区)
- Jiuzhouji Community (Chinese: 九洲基社区)
- Yongning Community (Chinese: 永宁社区)
- Xiqu Community (Chinese: 西区社区)
- Liexi First Community (Chinese: 埒西一社区)
- Lianfeng Community (Chinese: 联丰社区)

== Economy ==
Xiaolan is home to over 40,000 individual enterprises, of which, over 14,000 are manufacturing enterprises. Over 99% of the firms in Xiaolan are privately owned. Major brands headquartered in Xiaolan include Vatti, Luxking Group Holdings Limited, Chant Group (Chinese: 长青集团; pinyin: Chángqīng Jítuán), and Forest Lighting (Chinese: 木林森照明; pinyin: Mùlínsēn Zhàomíng). The city is a cluster for a number of industries, including hardware, underwear manufacturing, audio devices, locks, and lighting.

=== Primary sector ===
Agriculture is the main industry in the primary sector found in Xiaolan Town. The town is well known for its Chrysanthemum plants, and is often called “Chrysanthemum City” (Chinese: 菊城; pinyin: Jú Chéng), according to the town's government.

From October to November every year, Xiaolan hosts a chrysanthemum festival along its major streets and parks. The show features about 100,000 pots of over a thousand varieties. Every 60 years, a grand chrysanthemum exhibition will be held in Xiaolan.

=== Secondary sector ===
Xiaolan is dubbed “Lock City of the South” as well as “Electronic Acoustic Industrial Base” in China. The two industries are the pillar industries of Xiaolan.

Xiaolan controls 23% of the national market share. Indeed, there are production lines of such famous brands as Vantage gas stoves, Guli locks and St. Allen nail clippers in Xiaolan.

==== Locks ====
Over 30% of manufacturing enterprises in Xiaolan are engaged in locks and hardware production. Such production accounted for nearly 50% of the total industrial outputs of Xiaolan and employed more than 30,000 people in 2002. Xiaolan's success in this sector earned it a certification as a critical hardware industrial base by China National Hardware Association in 2002.

==== Audio devices ====
Meanwhile, a growth in the sector of electronic acoustics, which has taken place in recent years, has made Xiaolan the first "Electronic Acoustics Industrial Base" in China. Between 2000 and 2002, over a hundred enterprises started business in Xiaolan. Both local and foreign enterprises which specialize in production of domestic stereos, DVDs, laser heads, high-tech digital audio equipment, loudspeakers, circuit boards and aluminium panels are clustered in this small town. Production bases of such foreign brands as ADS and Boston operate in Xiaolan while Philips, Toshiba, JBL, Onkyo and Jamo also run their OEM production there. In 2002, the industrial outputs of this sector reached RMB 4.6 billion, accounting for almost one third of the town's industrial output.

==== Lighting ====
The town has a sizable lighting industry, specifically in the production of LED lights. This industry accounts for over ¥10 billion in value to the local economy. Major LED brands with a presence in Xiaolan include Forest Lighting (Chinese: 木林森照明; pinyin: Mùlínsēn Zhàomíng), Everlight Electronics, Honbro Technologies (Chinese: 鸿宝科技; pinyin: Hóngbǎo Kējì), Poso Lighting (Chinese: 品上照明; pinyin: Pǐnshàng Zhàomíng), and Guangyang Appliances (Chinese: 光阳电器; pinyin: Guāngyáng Diànqì).

=== Tertiary sector ===
Xiaolan has 19 banks and about 100 financial institutions as a whole.

=== Research and development ===
To improve research and development for local firms, a technology development centre specializing in the production of locks and hardware was set up in February 2003, and post-doctoral work stations and partnerships with universities have also been established to aid the town's hardware industry. An enterprise-based technology development centre with investment from a US-based acoustics stereo enterprise, AVlight was also established in Xiaolan Industrial Zone in 2002.

== Education ==
Xiaolan is home to 45 kindergartens, 15 public primary schools, 5 secondary schools, and 10 private schools.

== Healthcare ==
The Xiaolan People's Hospital (Chinese: 小榄人民医院; pinyin: Xiǎolǎn Rénmín Yīyuàn), and the Chen Xinghai Hospital (Chinese: 陈星海医院; pinyin: Chén Xīnghǎi Yīyuàn) are both located in the town. 98.85% of Xiaolan's population is insured.

== Culture ==
Many residents in Xiaolan cultivate chrysanthemums. On occasion, they provide chrysanthemum-themed banquets. They also create a number of chrysanthemum-themed poems and drawings.

=== Sports ===
The town has more than 70 public sports facilities, and 21 gymnasiums.

The Xiaolan Integrated Sports Centre was established in 1994, and has hosted a number of national and international ping-pong tournaments since then.

=== Historical attractions ===
- Shuangmei Bridge, a bridge built in 1368
- Jihou Temple (Chinese: 积厚祠), a temple built during the reign of the Wanli Emperor (1572–1620)
- Yinxiu Temple (Chinese: 隐秀寺), a temple built during the reign of the Kangxi Emperor (1661–1722)
- Shuangmei Mansion (Chinese: 双美府), a mansion built during the 1940s

== Transportation ==
The town's railway station, Xiaolan railway station is situated on the Guangzhou–Zhuhai intercity railway.

== Gallery ==
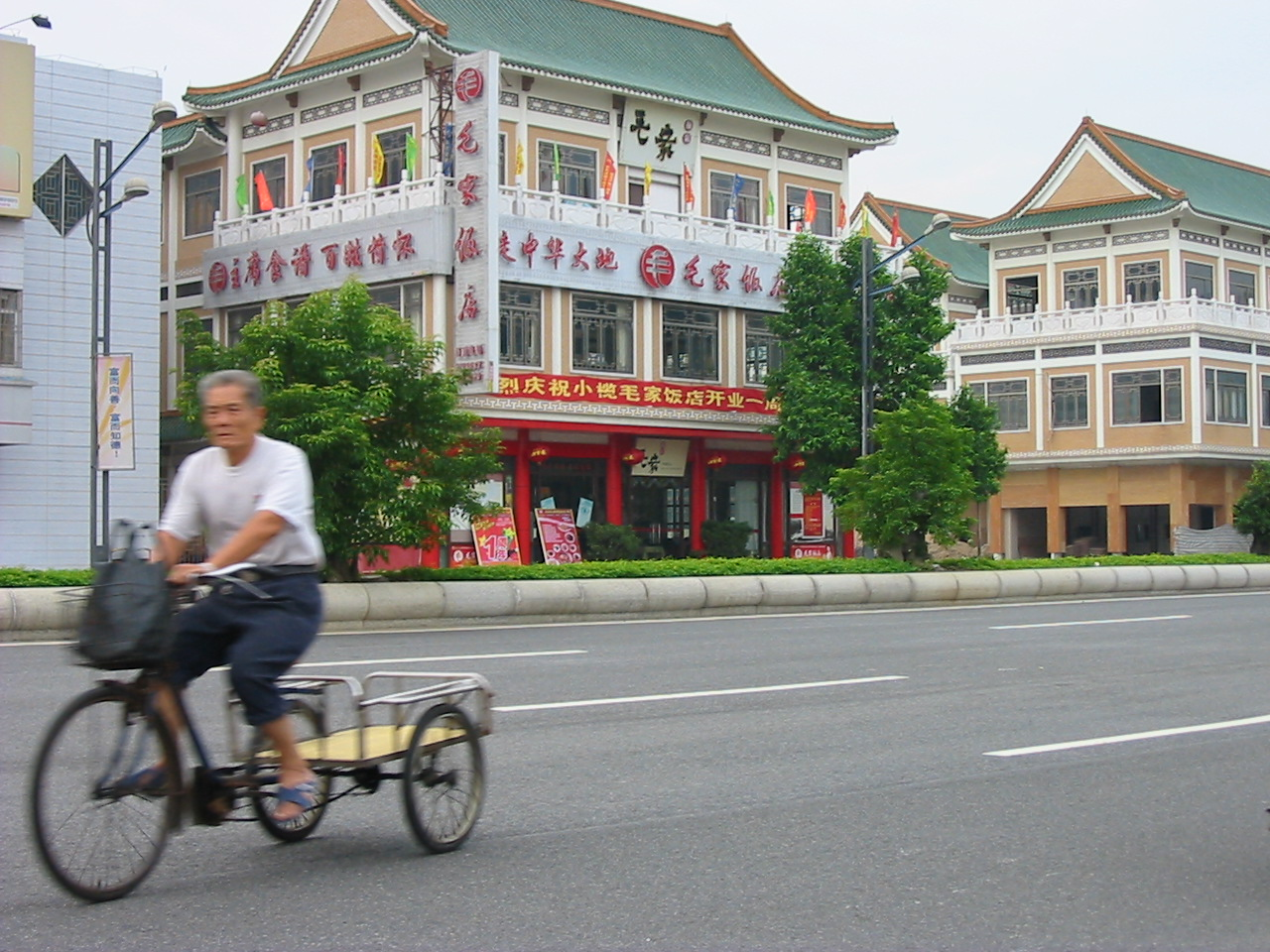
Man on Bike

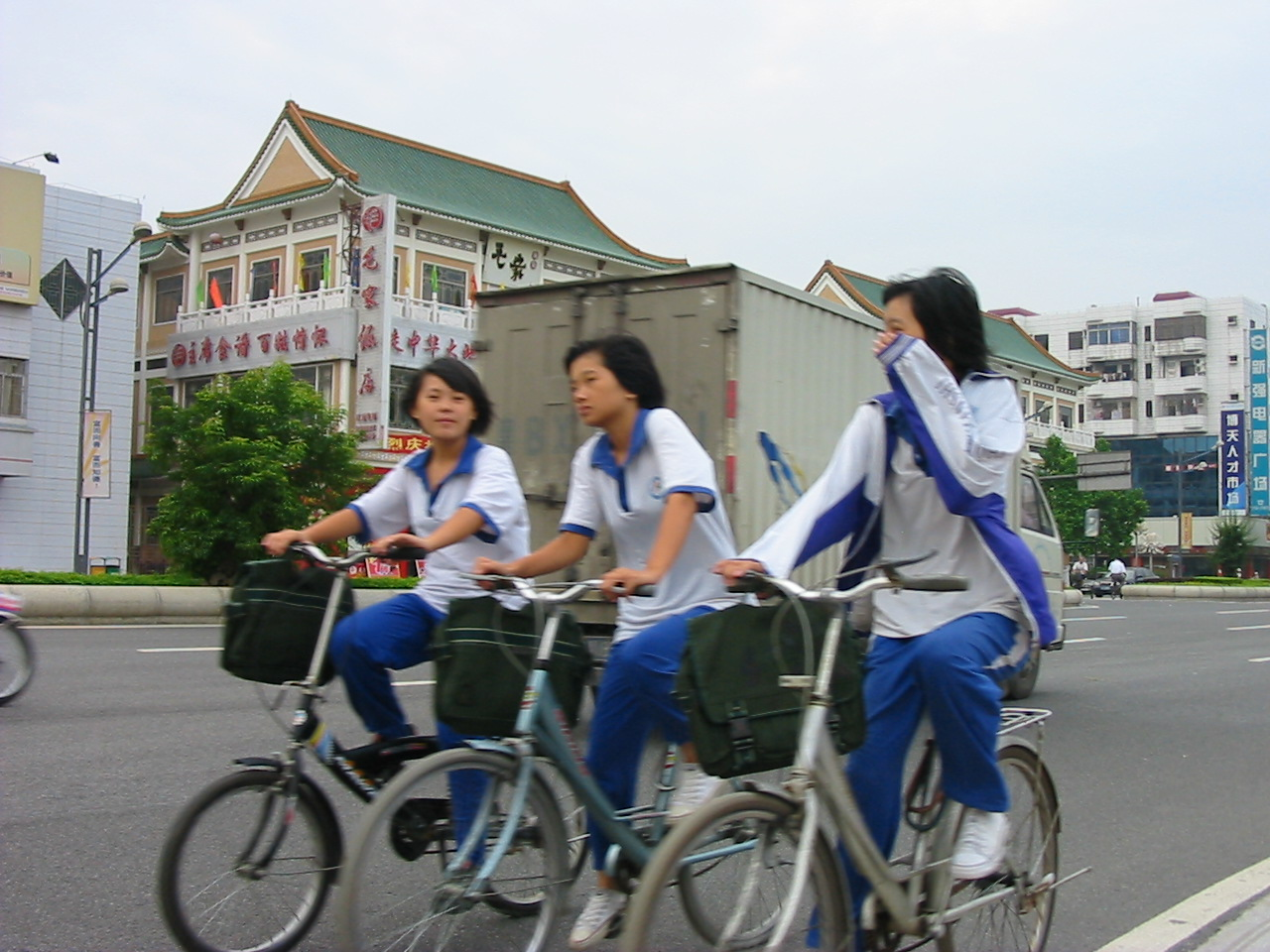
Schoolgirls on Bikes

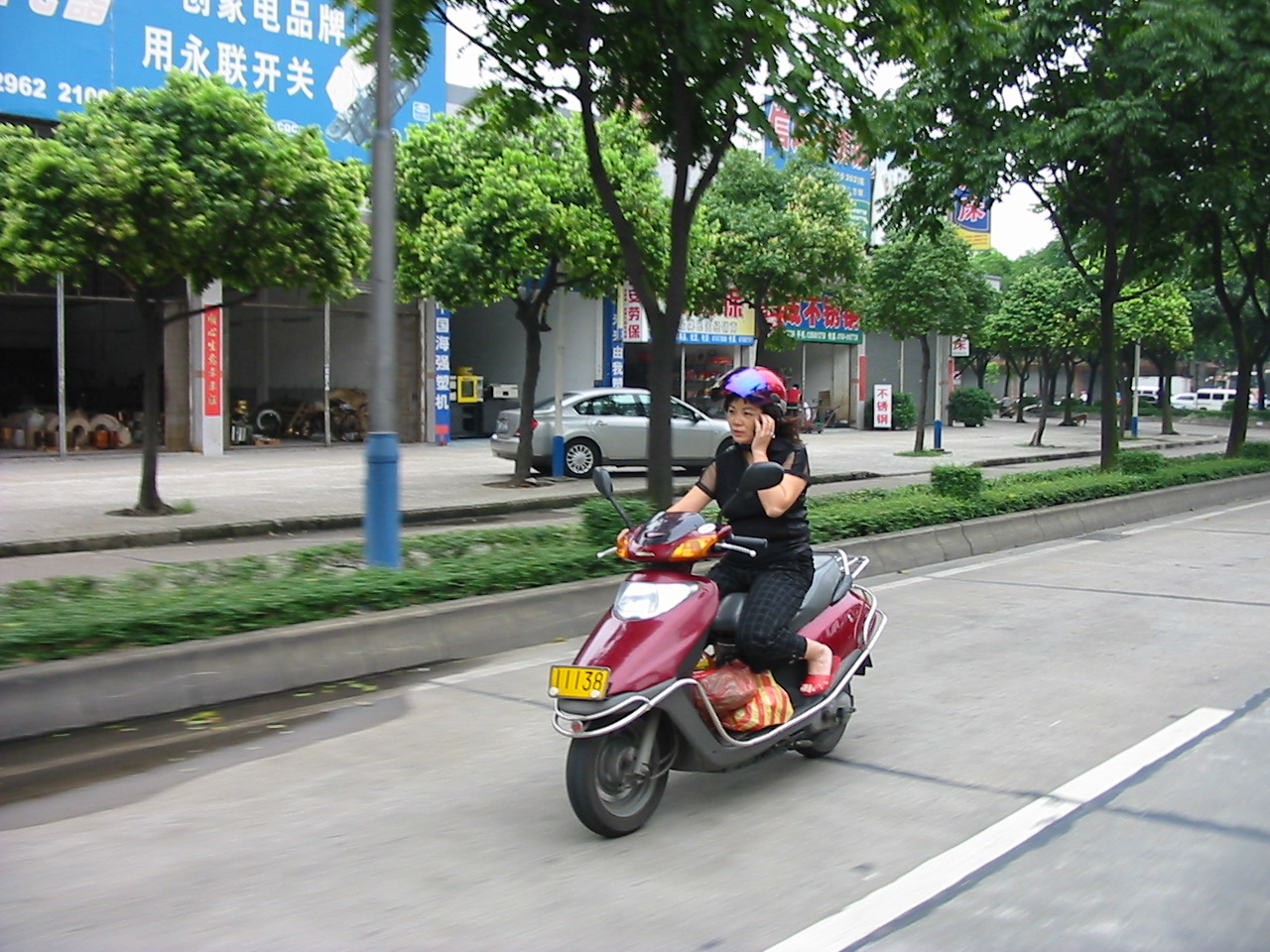
Scooter Rider on Mobile

== See also ==
- Xiaolan railway station
