= Sun Delin =

American soccer player (born 2001)

Personal information
- Date of birth: 20 January 2001 (age 25)
- Place of birth: Washington, D.C., United States
- Height: 1.75 m (5 ft 9 in)
- Position: Midfielder

Team information
- Current team: Dongguan United

Youth career
- 2017–2021: Guangzhou City

Senior career*
| Years | Team | Apps | (Gls) |
| 2021–2022 | 1. FC Düren II | 6 | (0) |
| 2022 | Guangzhou City | 1 | (0) |
| 2023– | Dongguan United | 3 | (0) |
- * Club domestic league appearances and goals as of 17:14, 24 November 2023 (UTC)

Sun Delin (Chinese: 孙德林; born 20 January 2001), known outside of China as Sterling Seyedin or Dylan Sterling, is an American soccer player who plays as a midfielder.

== Early life ==
Born in Washington, D.C. in the United States to a Chinese mother and an Iranian-American father, Sun's family moved to Guangzhou, China shortly after his birth.

As well as taking an interest in football at a young age, he also played a lot of other sports, most notably martial arts, winning a number of gold medals in international tournaments. He also played basketball as a child, and featured in a commercial with NBA player Kevin Garnett.

== Club career ==
Sun first started playing football at a young age, and while preparing to star in the lead role in a film called "Little Flag Raiser" - a film about a boy who likes to play football - he was given the opportunity to train with a women's football team at the Guangdong Olympic Stadium in preparation for the role. He also received personal football training from former Chinese international Chi Minghua.

At the age of sixteen, Sun joined the academy of professional side Guangzhou City. He progressed through the academy, before moving to Germany in 2021 to sign with 1. FC Düren. While in Germany, he featured solely for the reserve team of FC Duren.

In 2022, he returned to China and re-joined Guangzhou City, going on to make his debut in the Chinese FA Cup, providing an assist for Wu Chengru's goal in the 1–0 win over Xi'an Ronghai. He would go on to make two more appearances for Guangzhou City, including one in the Chinese Super League, but left the club following its dissolution at the conclusion of the 2022 season.

He joined China League One side Dongguan United in August 2023.

== Acting career ==
Sun took an interest in acting from a young age, and appeared in his first television commercial at the age of one year and four months old. By the age of eleven, he had featured in almost 1000 commercials, as well as being cast in a number of TV shows and movies. In October 2022, he was cast to play an adult Kang Qizu in Kang's Family, rather than the actors who had previously portrayed Kang.

== Career statistics ==
=== Club ===
As of 24 November 2023.

Appearances and goals by club, season and competition
| Club | Season | League | | | Cup | | Other | | Total | |
| Club | Season | Division | Apps | Goals | Apps | Goals | Apps | Goals | Apps | Goals |
|---|---|---|---|---|---|---|---|---|---|---|
| 1. FC Düren II | 2021–22 | Landesliga Mittelrhein | 6 | 0 | – | | 0 | 0 | 6 | 0 |
| Guangzhou City | 2022 | Chinese Super League | 1 | 0 | 2 (Note: Appearances in the Chinese FA Cup) | 0 | 0 | 0 | 3 | 0 |
| Dongguan United | 2023 | China League One | 3 | 0 | 0 | 0 | 0 | 0 | 3 | 0 |
| Career total | | | 10 | 0 | 2 | 0 | 0 | 0 | 12 | 0 |
