= Xiguan =

Area in the Liwan district of Guangzhou, China

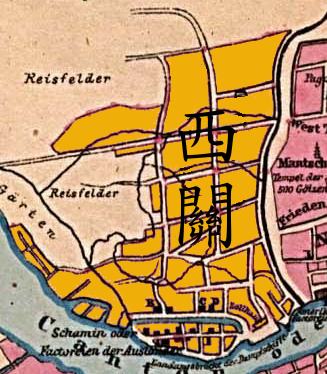
- Xiguan on a German map from 1878
- Traditional Chinese: 西關
- Simplified Chinese: 西关
- Jyutping: Sai1 Gwaan1
- Literal meaning: Westgate [Land beyond the] Western Gate(s)
Transcriptions
Standard Mandarin
- Hanyu Pinyin: Xīguān
Yue: Cantonese
- Yale Romanization: Sāi Gwāan
- Jyutping: Sai1 Gwaan1

Xiyuan/Sai Yuan
- Traditional Chinese: 西園
- Simplified Chinese: 西园
- Jyutping: Sai1 jyun4
- Literal meaning: Western Garden
Transcriptions
Standard Mandarin
- Hanyu Pinyin: Xīyuán
Yue: Cantonese
- Yale Romanization: Sāi yùhn
- Jyutping: Sai1 jyun4

Xiguanjiao/Sai Kwan Corner
- Traditional Chinese: 西關角
- Simplified Chinese: 西关角
- Jyutping: Sai1 gwaan1 gok3
- Literal meaning: Westgate Corner; Westgate Quarter
Transcriptions
Standard Mandarin
- Hanyu Pinyin: Xīguānjiǎo
Yue: Cantonese
- Yale Romanization: Sāi gwāan gok
- Jyutping: Sai1 gwaan1 gok3

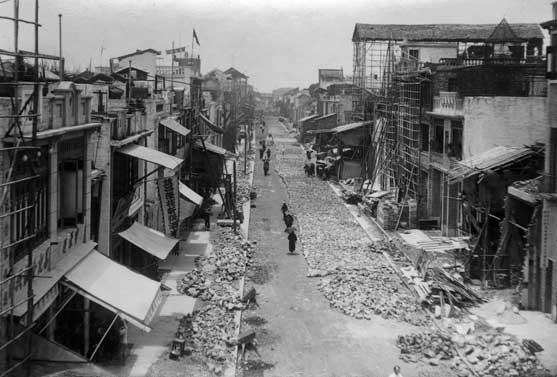
Baohua Road in Xihuan during the widening of its roads in the 1920s.

Xiguan, or Sai Kwan (Chinese: 西關; Jyutping: sai^{1}gwaan^{1}; lit. 'Western Gate'), is an ancient town and an area in the Liwan district of Guangzhou, China, which was located west of the old walled city. The Thirteen Factories trading enclave was located on its southern shore and the Shamian enclave was constructed beside it. Linguistically, the district is the origin of Sai Kwan dialect, the prestige dialect of Cantonese.

It now forms most of Liwan District.

== Name ==
Before the 20th century, Guangzhou was a walled city with many gates. Its western gates included the Taiping Gate (Chinese: 太平門; Jyutping: taai3 ping4 mun4; lit. 'Gate of Great Peace') and the West Gate (Chinese: 正西門; pinyin: Zhengximén; Jyutping: zing3 sai1 mun4; lit. 'Straight Western Gate'). "Saikwan" or "Sai Kwan" is a romanization of the local Cantonese pronunciation of the same Chinese characters. It was formerly the area's more common English name, although Mandarin pinyin is now the official form within China. It was also sometimes simply translated as "Westgate" or the "western suburbs" of Guangzhou (formerly known as "Canton").

"Xiguan" or "New Xiguan" (新西關) is also an informal name for Guangzhou's Liwan District.

== Geography ==
Old Xiguan covered most of the present Liwan District, excluding Xicun (sai1 cyun1; 'West Village') Lychee Bay, and the old Fangcun District. It ran along the Pearl River from the 1st Quay (第一津) in the northwest to the outlet of the western moat (西濠) in the southeast. This "creek" formed the eastern boundary of the Thirteen Factories and separated Xiguan from Nanguan, the old city's southern suburb and Chinese dockyards. The foreign enclave on Shamian Island was usually excluded from Xiguan but Huangsha (黃沙; wong4 saa1; 'Yellow Sands') was usually included.

The northeastern area from the 1st Wharf to Taiping Gate was called Upper Xiguan (上西關; Shàng Xīguān; soeng6 sai1 gwaan1) and the southwestern area stretching to Huangsha was known as Lower Xiguan (下西關; Xià Xīguān; haa6 sai1 gwaan1)

In modern Guangzhou, the preservation district of Xiguan is formally defined as follows:

The northern boundary of Xiguan is the #7 and #8 Zhongshan Roads (中山七路, Zhōngshān Qī Lù, and 中山八路, Zhōngshān Bā Lù) and its eastern boundary is Middle and South Renmin Roads (人民中路, Rénmín Zhōng Lù, and 人民南路, Rénmín Nán Lù). Its south and west reach the Pearl River.

This covers an area of 536 hectares (2.07 sq mi) and includes the area of former Shamian, united with the mainland through land reclamation.

== History ==
The suburbs outside Guangzhou's Taiping Gate came to be called "Xiguan" during the Ming dynasty (14th–17th century). Over time, they expanded to fill the fields between the walled city and the Pearl River. The area was administered as part of Nanhai County. It was known for its loveliness. (Note: Old Guangzhou sayings held that "In the east, there are villages; in the west, beauty; in the south, wealth; and in the north, poverty" (東村、西俏、南富、北貧, dōng cun, xī qiào, nán fù, běi pín) and "Ladies in Xiguan, Gentlemen in Dongshan, and riffraff on Henan".) On 15 February 1921, Xiguan was removed from Nanhai County and united with Guangfu to form an enlarged Guangzhou. On 27 October 2006, the Liwan District Government approved a preservation plan for Xiguan's traditional architecture and culture.

== Culture ==
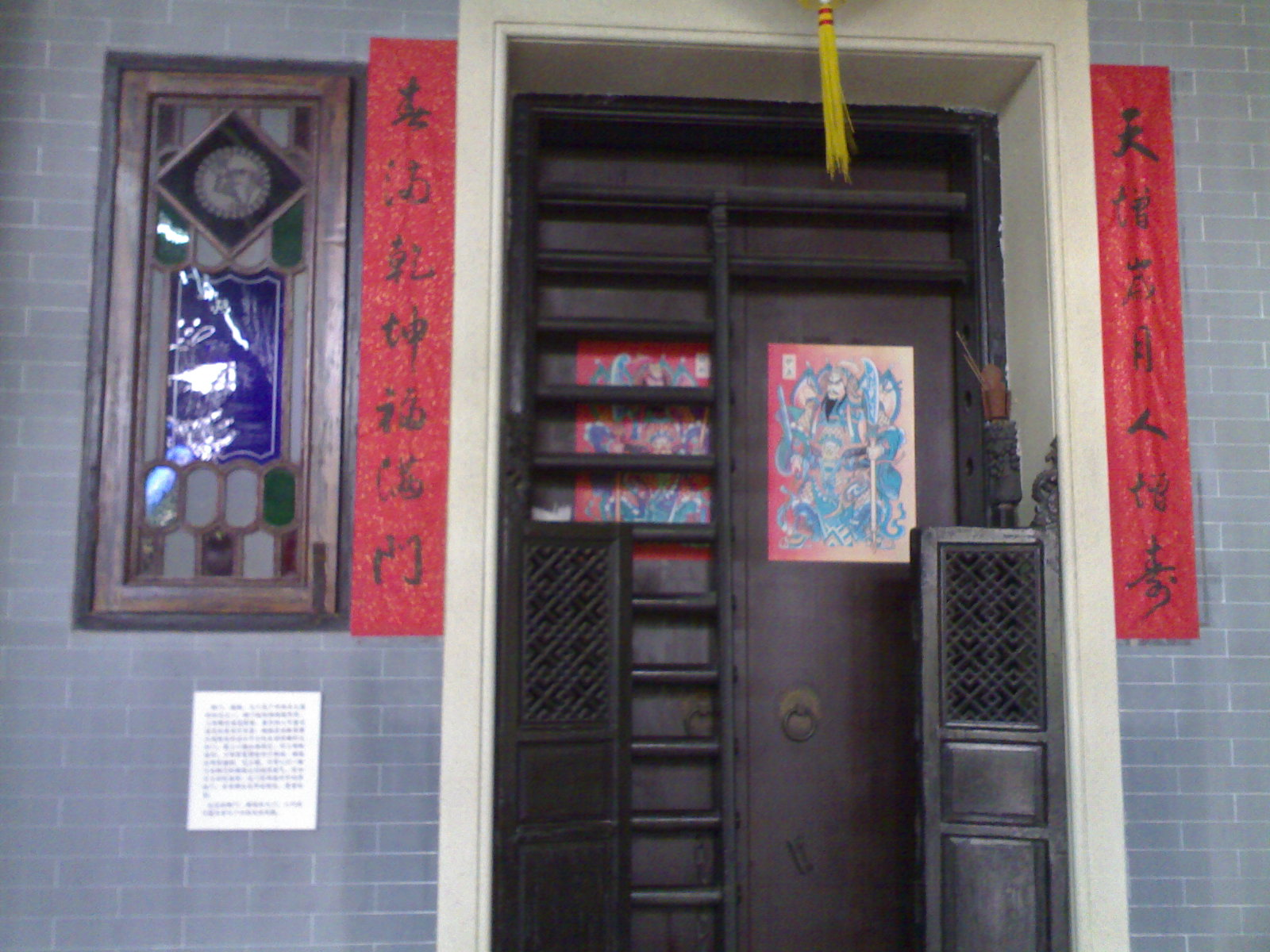
Three-ply Doors complete with replica scenery.

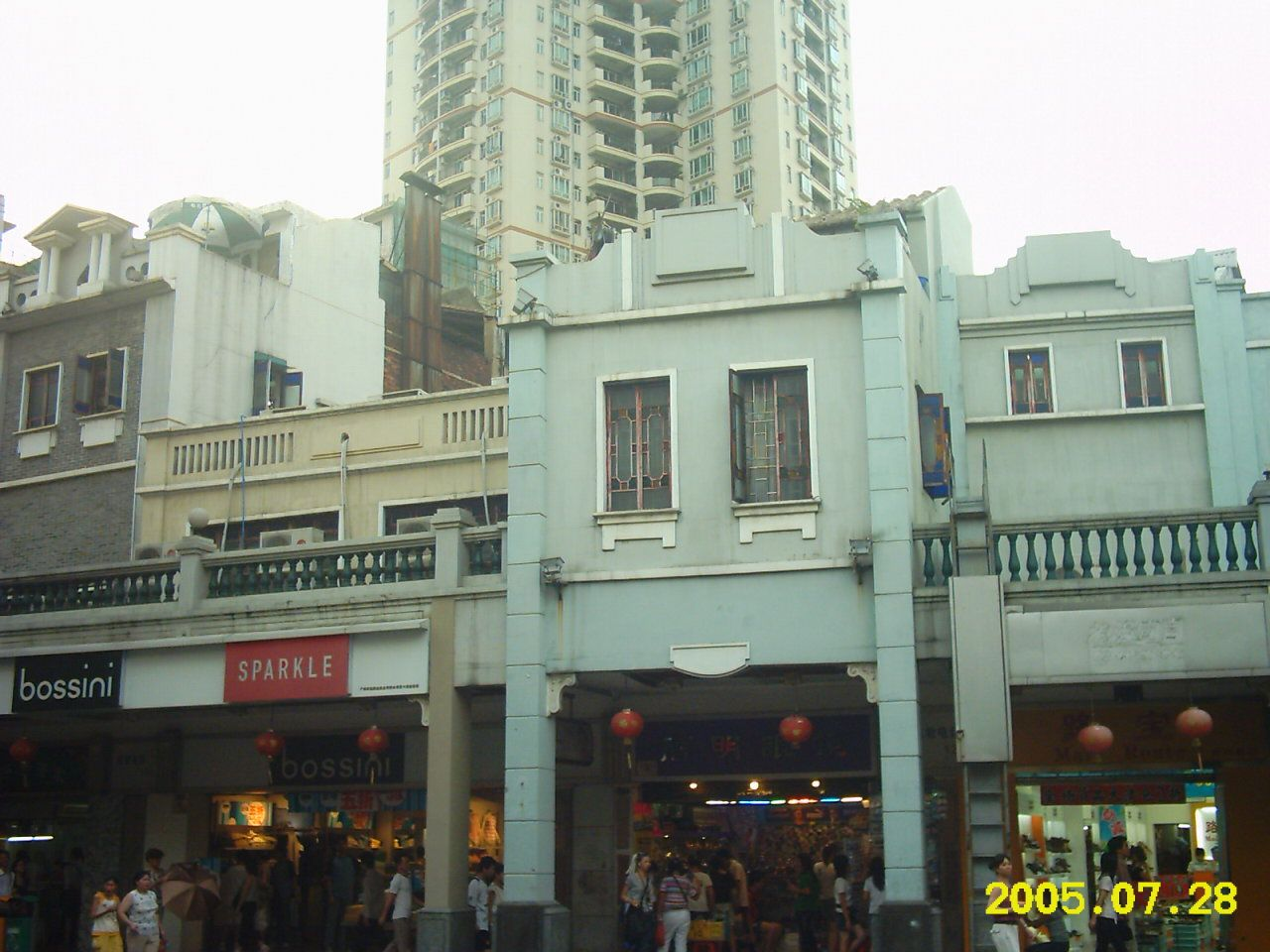
Arcades on Shangxiajiu

Apart from its connection to Guangdong's Lingnan and Cantonese culture, Xiguan is famed within China as the site of "Eastward spread of Western learning" (西學東漸). There are varieties of customs in Xiguan, which are comparatively well conserved among districts in Guangzhou. Customs during the Chinese New Year, on Tomb Sweeping Day and Chinese Valentine's Day, during the Mid-Autumn Festival, and at the Winter Solstice are more or less the same as those in other places in Guangzhou. During the Dragon Boat Festival, some male residents row dragon boats.

The area's culture is celebrated in Dongshan Shaoye's song "Miss Xiguan and Liao Weili's album Xiguan. Xiguan is the setting of the mainland Chinese dramas Kang's Family and Turbulent Xiguan (風雨西關) and the Hong Kong dramas Point of No Return (2003) and When Easterly Showers Fall on the Sunny West (2008).

=== Architecture ===
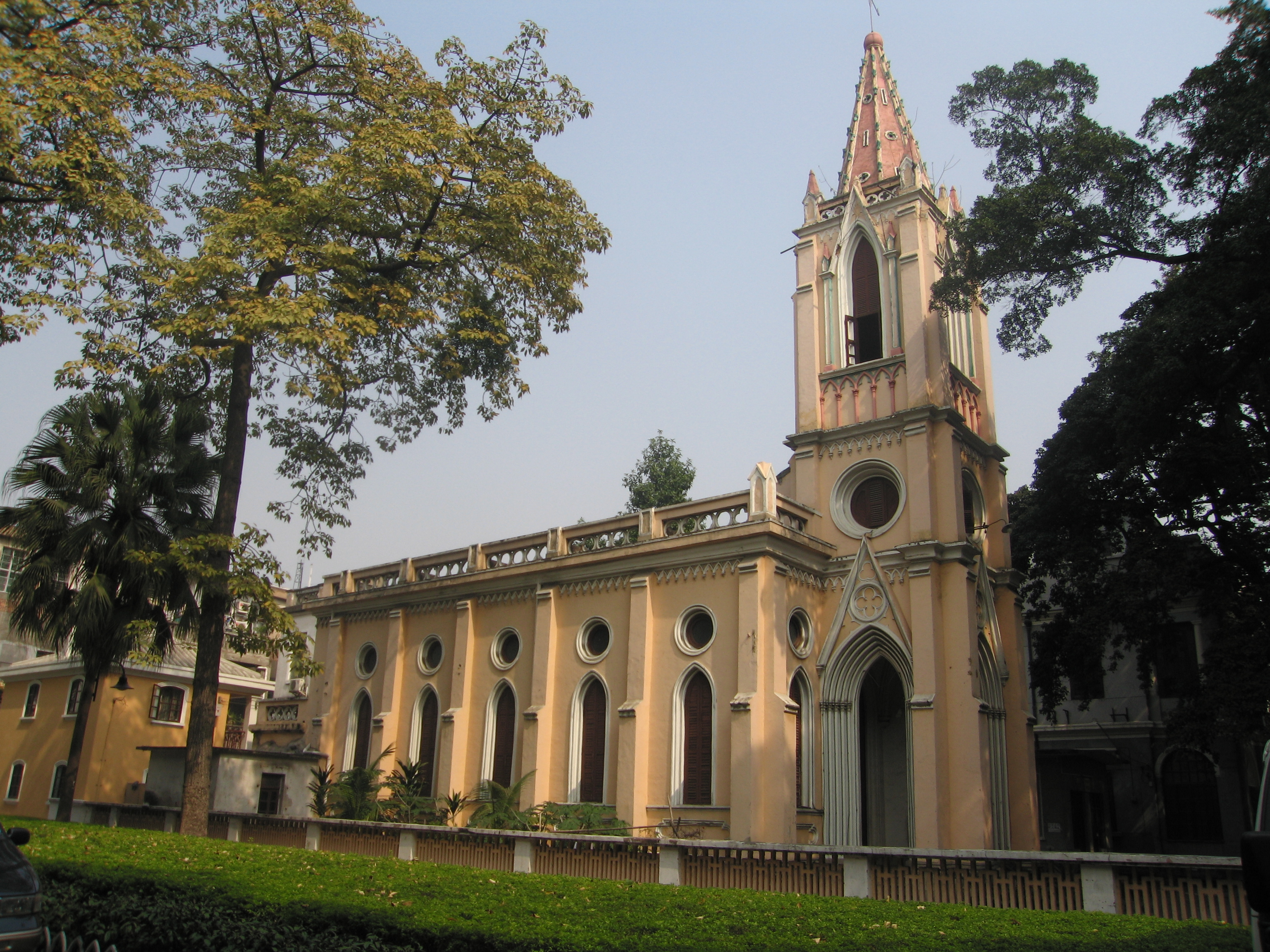
Church of Our Lady of Lourdes (Catholic church) on Shamian Island

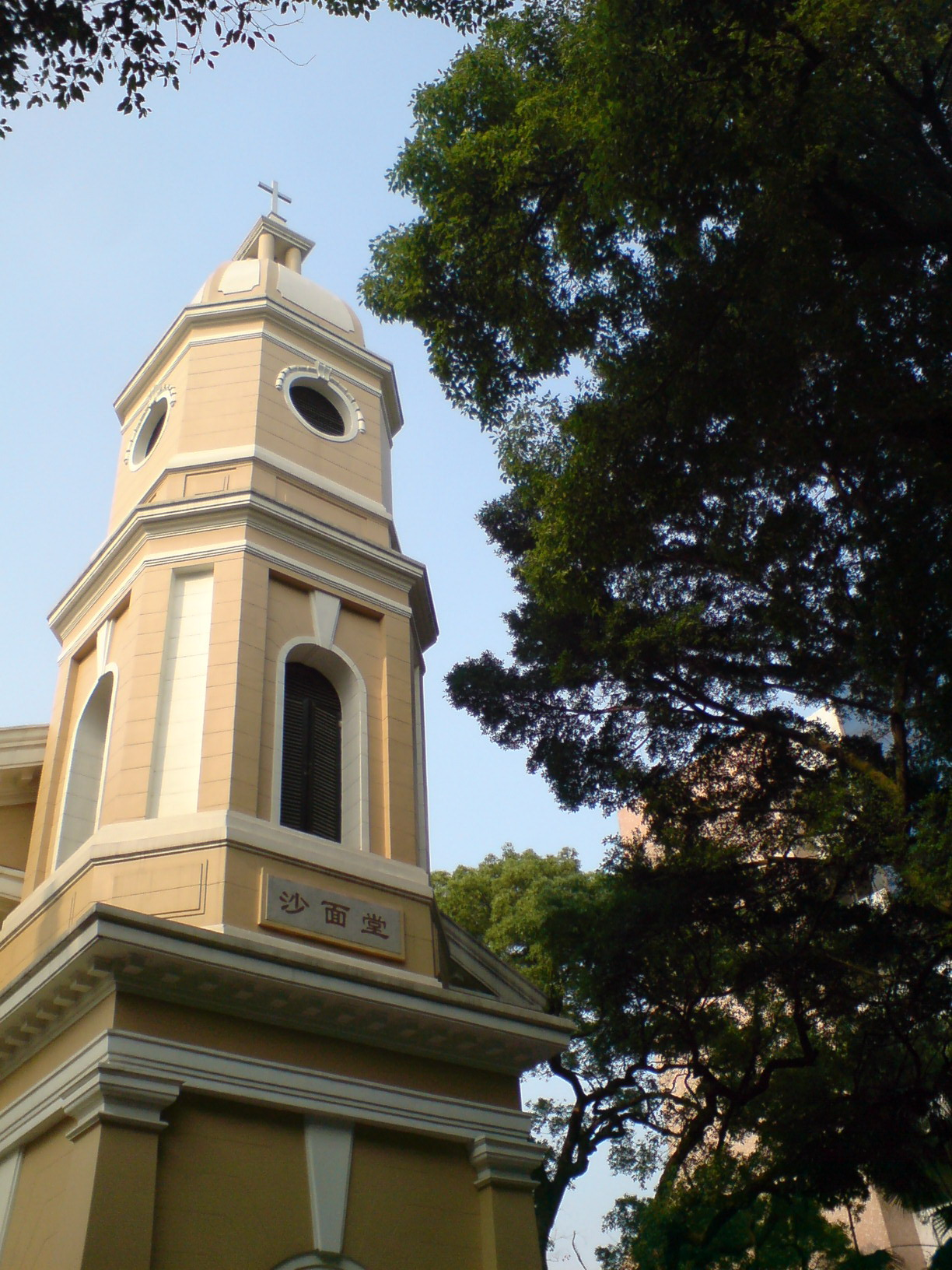
Christ Church Shamian (Protestant church)

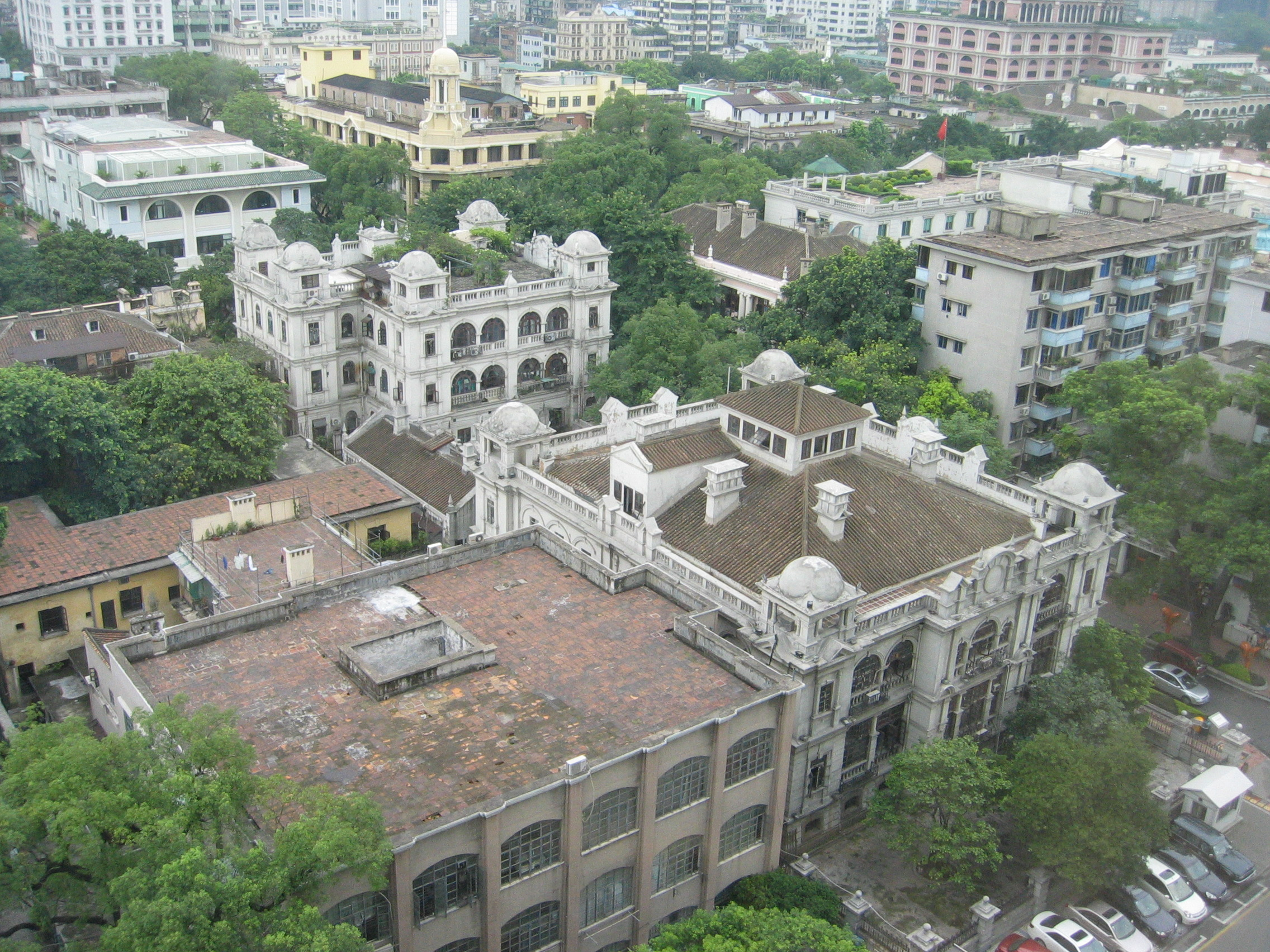
Architectural complex on Shamian Island

Xiguan Residences (西關大屋), which used to be the residences of wealthy businessmen, are the typical representative of vernacular dwellings in Xiguan.

Zhutong ("Bamboo Tube") Houses are traditional houses that are rich in characteristics of Lingnan (a geographical area referring to lands in the south of China's "Five Ranges" which are Tayu, Qitian, Dupang, Mengzhu, Yuecheng. This region covers the Guangdong, Guangxi, Hunan and Jiangxi provinces of modern China and northern Vietnam). They are relatively cruder and narrower than a Xi guan (West Customs) house. The width of this type of house is short and the depth is long; the W/L ratio varies from 1:4 to 1:8. The rooms are arranged from front to back with skylights (天井) as intervals thus the shape of a bamboo tube. Ventilation, drainage and traffic are mainly dependent on the skylights and the roadway, i.e. the longer the house is, the more skylights are required. They appear to be one story, but since they can reach a height of 4.5 meters, they always set floor levels and stairways within the house. Stones are used to construct the base of a wall and bricks are used as the body of each wall. They always have a gable, a wooden frame and a tiled roof.

Some people claim that arcades (騎樓) in Xiguan correlate closely to the residences of ancient people living in Nanyue. They are considered as the trace of Baiyue stilt house (干欄屋). On the other hand, some people insist that arcades are structures built in 1925 when streets were extended and roads were constructed on a large scale in Guangzhou. Their design is deemed to have derived from ancient Greece. Arcades connect houses and make a long path for pedestrians to keep out wind, rain and the glare of sunshine. Arcades seem to be exactly designed for the climate in Guangzhou and meanwhile makes it much more convenient for stores to display their goods and attract customers. This kind of structure has always been the main feature of Guangzhou's commercial atmosphere and has become the sign of Guangdong Street or Canton Street (廣東街) in other places, such as Jinling Donglu (金陵東路) in Shanghai. Arcades in Guangzhou first appeared in the area around Sacred Heart Cathedral on Yide Road (一德路). Later, other business quarters in Guangzhou imitated the example such as Shangxiajiu, Zhongshan Road, Enning Road (恩寧路) and Renmin Nanlu.

The fashions of buildings on Shamian can be divided into four categories: New Baroque, Neoclassical, Veranda, and Pseudo-Gothic. During the end of the nineteenth century to early twentieth centuries, along the Changdi (長堤; Coeng4-tai4; 'Long riverbank') and Xidi (西堤; sai1 tai4; 'west riverbank') of the Pearl River in Guangzhou, large office and commercial buildings were constructed, which reflected the popular new classical architectural style of the Nineteenth Century Western Countries and have also retained the architectural features of the Grecian and Roman times.

=== Cuisine ===
Delicacies which have earned the title of Chinese Famous Food are as follows: Peanut & Sesame Filled Cake of Ronghua Teahouse (榮華樓; wing4 waa4 lau4), Double skin milk and Milk With Ginger Juice of Nanxin, Shrimp Wonton of Ouchengji, Jidi Congee of Wuzhanji, Ginger Juice & Milk Custard Tart of Qingping Restaurant (清平飯店; cing1 ping4 faan6 dim3), Sweetheart Cake of Lianxianglou Teahouse (蓮香樓; lin4 hoeng1 lau4), Rice Noodle Roll With Beef of Yinji and Goose Liver Boiled Dumplings of Jinzhongge.

Delicacies which have earned the title of Guangzhou Famous Food are as follows: Milk With Ginger Juice of Xinghualou Teahouse, Milk Paste of Fenghuang, Sesame Paste Sweet Dumplings of Rongde, Sachima of Satangji, Sampan Congee, Salty Pancake of Dechang, Stuffed Glutinous Rice Dumpling and Burst (Laughing) Deep-fried Pastry Ball of Liangyingji, White Sugar Lunjiao Cake of Guohua, Coconut Ice Cream and Grass Jelly of Shunji Bingshi (順記冰室; Seon6-gei3 Bing1-sat1; 'Shun's Bing sutt').

The Chinese character 記; ji; gei3 is often used in a restaurant's signage, often following the owner's name. For instance, Kaiji is named for its owner Ye Jiankai.

Double-skin milk in Daliang, Shunde owns a most famous reputation. The founder of Nanxin (南信; naam4 seon3) comes from Shunde, and set up a shop in Guangzhou in 1943.

The name is actually derived from the cookery and taste. When it is cooked, it appears as there are two skins for the milk. Originally in Guangzhou, the most famous one would be Nanxin store, but it's now combined with other famous snack to be sold. It looks as the white jelly and with sweet taste.

Coconut ice cream of Shunji Bingshi is a well-known Xiguan snack. The restaurant was established by a street hawker named Lu Shun in the 1920s. Coconut juice, extracted from fresh coconut meat, diluted milk, eggs and refined white sugar are the ingredients. The delicacies of Shunji have been tasted by heads of foreign states and honored guests such as Norodom Sihanouk from Cambodia in the 1950s and 1960s. Since 1956, the restaurant has acquired the title of Guangzhou Famous Food.

Kaiji (開記; Hoi1 Gei3) is located on Longjin Donglu. Its owner is Ye Jiankai and he is jokingly called Dousha Kai (豆沙開) because of the restaurant's food. Kaiji's Tangyuan served with green bean soup and Vanilla green bean soup clear away diners' heat and toxic material and earn a high reputation in Guangzhou. The shop is Ye's grandfather's legacy.

Shrimp Wonton Noodle of Ouchengji (歐成記; au1 sing4 gei3) is famous. The soup served with this delicacy is the double-stewed soup made of shrimp-roe, flounder and pig bones. Fresh pork, shrimp and eggs are used in stuffing of the wontons. The wonton wrapper is so thin that wontons appear carneous after being cooked thoroughly, thus called glass wontons .

Jidi Congee (及第粥; kap6 dai2 zuk1) of Wuzhanji (伍湛記), alternatively called "Sanyuan Jidi Congee" (三元及第粥), has been famous since Republic of China. Located in Wenchang Xiang, the restaurant is famous for its variety of congee, Jidi the congee in particular. This congee contains dried beancurd stick, ginkgo and flounder. The congee is also called Sanyuan Jidi Congee for the reason that the numbers of its ingredients in each bowl, namely pork balls, pork liver slices and pork intestine slices correspond respectively to the numbers of Zhuangyuan, Bangyan (榜眼), and Tanhua (探花). Wuzhanji's Jidi Congee earned the title of Chinese Famous Food in 1997.

Rice noodle roll was originated by the Hexianguan Restaurant in Pantang (泮塘; pun3 tong4) during the Second Sino-Japanese War and it has been a must in Guangzhou's restaurants. Rice noodle roll with beef of Yinji (銀記; ngan4 gei3) is the most famous type. Rice milk is steamed into rice pellicle with meat smash, fillet and pork liver on it and the pellicle is rolled and then cut apart.

Sampan Congee (艇仔粥; teng5 zai2 zuk1) comes from Lychee Bay. It is called Sampan Congee because it was sold by Tanka people on sampans. Its ingredients used to be only river prawns and slices of fish. Now it has become a commonly seen snack and has gradually become a dish served in restaurants and hotels. Its ingredients are unceasingly updated, with salted jellyfish, peanuts and fried vermicelli.

== Education ==
=== Elementary schools ===
- Xiguan Peizheng Primary School
- Xianjidong Primary School
- Sanyuanfang Primary School
- Liuhua Lu Primary School
- Dongfeng Xilu No.1 Primary School
- Dongfeng Xilu No.2 Primary School
- Xihua Lu Primary School
- Xinglong Lu Primary School
- Longjin Xilu Primary School
- Huiyuannan Primary School
- Xilaixi Primary School
- Affiliated Primary School of Guangzhou Normal School
- Liwan Lexianfang Primary School
- Shamian Primary School
- Guangya Li Primary School
- Liwan Baoyuan Zhongyue Primary School
- Wenchang Xiang Primary School
- Baohua Primary School
- Ludixi Primary School
- Mingxing Li Primary School
- Huangsha Dadao Primary School
- Renmin Zhonglu Primary School
- Zhoumen Primary School
- Shuangqiao Primary School
- Liwan Experimental School
- Huancuiyuan Primary School
- Zhongshan Balu Primary School
- Guangya Primary School
- Huanshi Xilu Primary School
- Longjin Primary School
- Baohua Peizheng Primary School
- Liwan Huaqiao Primary School
- Liwan Xihua Lu Primary School
- Zhuji Lu Primary School
- Yaohua Primary School
- Wenchang Primary School
- Jinyan Li Primary School

=== High schools ===
- Guangdong Guangya Middle School
- Guangzhou No.4 Middle School
- Guangzhou Vocational School of Early Childhood Education
- Guangzhou No.35 Middle School
- Guangzhou No.31 Middle School
- Guangzhou Xiguan Foreign Language School (former Middle School)
- Guangzhou No.1 Middle School
- Guangzhou Xiehe Senior School (former Guangzhou Normal School)
- Guangzhou Meihua Middle School (former Guangzhou No.59 Middle School)
- Guangzhou No.23 Middle School
- Guangzhou No.36 Middle School
- Guangzhou No.90 Middle School (emerged into Peiying Middle School)
- Guangzhou Chenjiageng Memorial Middle School (former Guangzhou No.30 Middle School)
- Guangzhou No.23 Middle School
- Liuhua Middle School
- Guangzhou Nanhai Middle School (former Guangzhou No.11 Middle School)
- Guangzhou No.69 Middle School (Closed; afterwards became the campus of Xianjidong Primary School)
- Guangzhou No.24 Middle School
- Xiguan Peiying Middle School
- Guangzhou No.100 Middle School (emerged into Guangzhou Nanhai Middle School)
- Guangzhou Liwan Middle School (former Guangzhou No.43 Middle School)

== Transportation ==
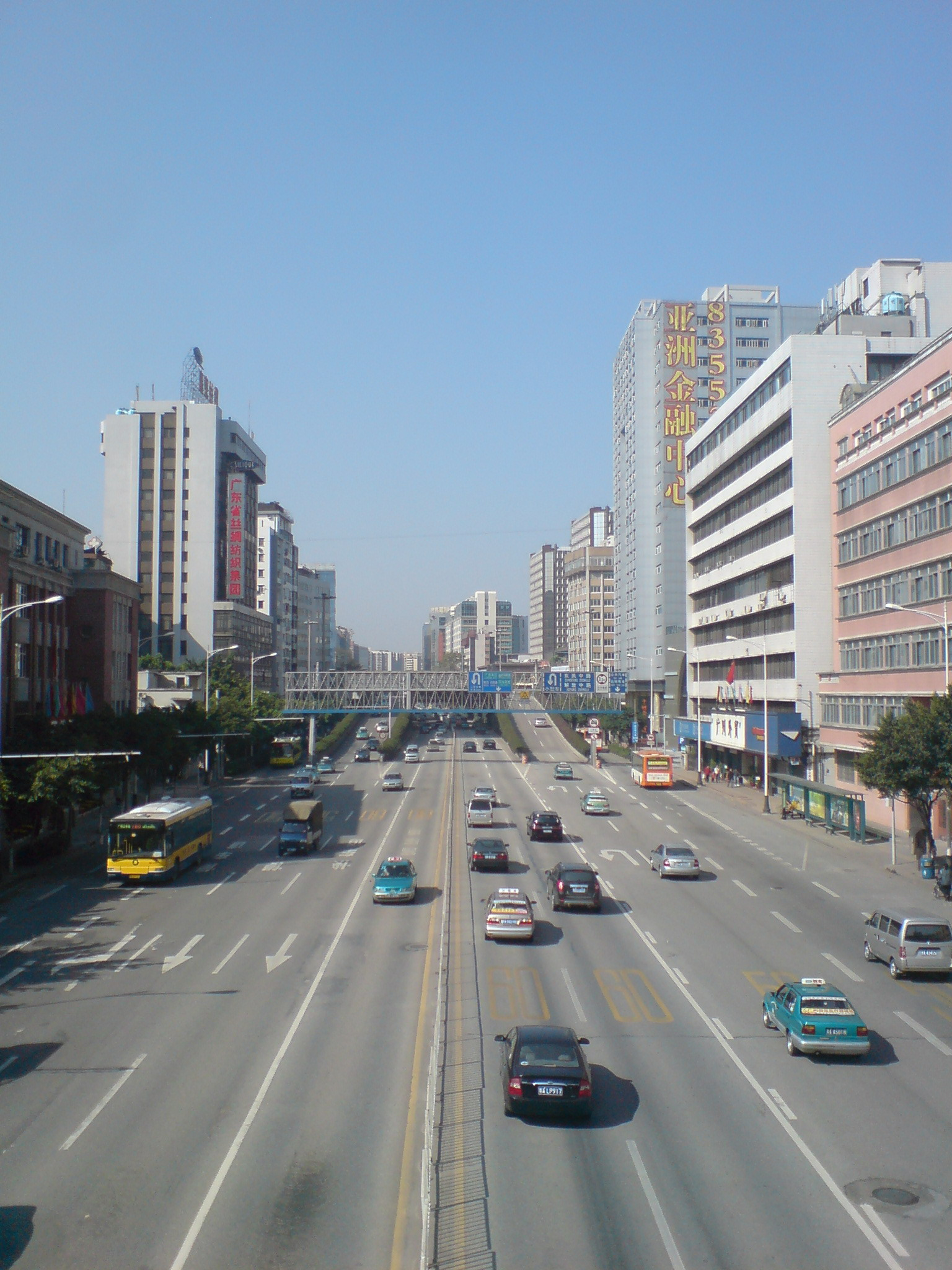
Dongfeng Road

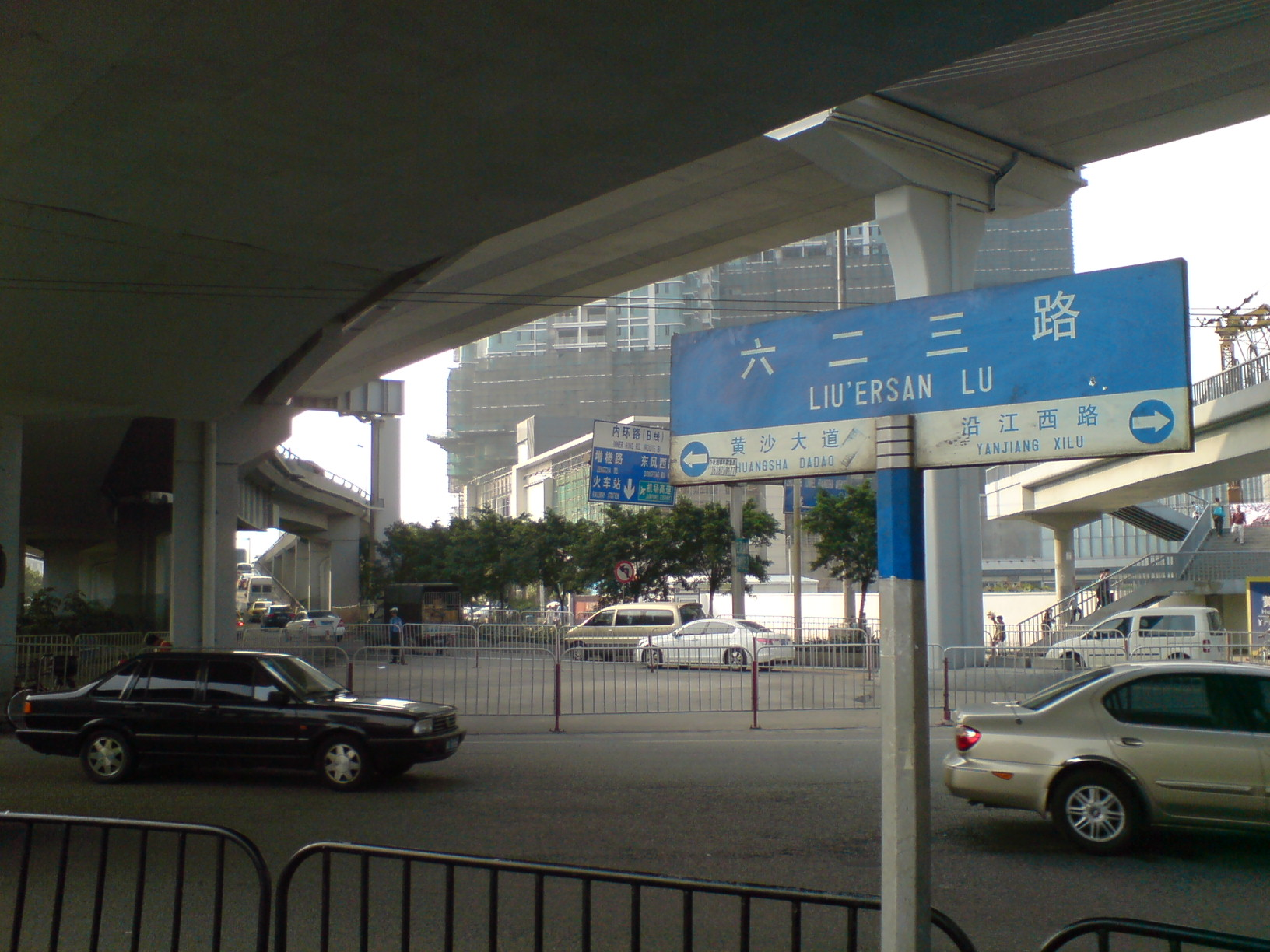
623 Road

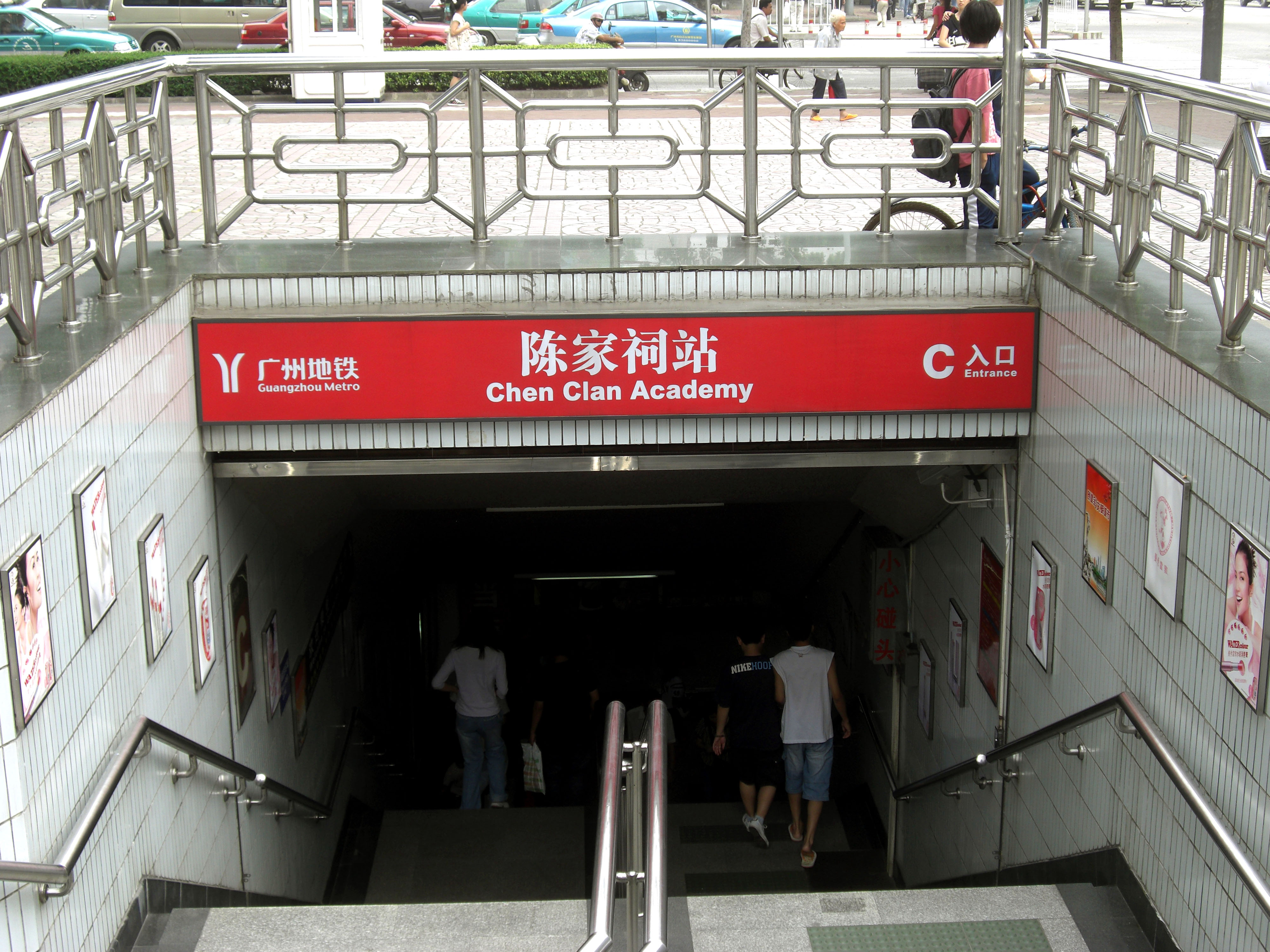
Line 1's Chen Clan Academy Station

Historically, creeks and canals formed the main arteries of transportation in the area. With Guangzhou's urbanization, most of these have been filled and paved or built over. The present area's major roads are Renmin Road in the east on the site of Guangzhou's old moat and city walls, Zhongshan Road in the north, and Dongfeng, Huanshi, 623, Nan'an, and Kangwang Roads and Huangsha Avenue. The Pearl River is crossed by the Zhujiang and Renmin Bridges and the Zhujiang Tunnel.

A local feature are surviving granite streets and lanes (麻石街巷), which were used around the Xiguan residences.

Xiguan is well connected to the Guangzhou Metro. Line 1 stops at the Chen Clan Ancestral Hall, Changshou Road, and Huangsha; Line 5 stops at Zhongshanba, Xichang, and Xicun; Line 6 stops at the Cultural Park, Huangsha, and Ruyifang; Line 8 stops at the Chen Hall, Hualin Temple, and Cultural Park; and Line 11 stops at Zhongshanba.

== See also ==
- Liwan District
- West Guan Yong
