= Shekki =

Shekki may refer to:

- Shekki, a former Chinese city in Guangdong Province, now the Shiqi Subdistrict of Zhongshan
- Shaki, Azerbaijan
- Finnish for cheque
