= Jiujiang (disambiguation) =

Jiujiang is a prefecture-level city in Jiangxi, China

Jiujiang may also refer to:

- Chaisang District (formerly Jiujiang County), district of Jiujiang City, Jiangxi Province, China
- Jiujiang District, district of Wuhu City, Anhui Province, China
- Jiujiang, Foshan, town in Nanhai District, Foshan, Guangdong, China
