= Xiguan Creek =

Former river in China

Coordinates: 23.1148°N 113.2409°E

1930s map of Guangzhou showing the former course of the Xiguan Creek at the bottom left.

Xiguan Creek (Chinese: 西关涌; pinyin: Xiguān chōng; Jyutping: Sai^{1}gwaan^{1} cung^{1}) is a former river located in Xiguan, Guangzhou, China. It was about 5 kilometres (3 mi) long and divided into two branches: the Upper Xiguan Creek and the Lower Xiguan Creek. Because of urban development, the waterway has been converted into culverts.

During the reign of the Ming Dynasty Wanli Emperor (1572–1620), ships could sail along Xiguan Creek up to the Qingyun Bridge, which is today's Qingyun Li, Taoshadang, and Wanzhong Li. Since the time of the Qing Dynasty, Daguan River, which is connected to Xiguan Creek, has silted up as far as Guilan (called Ruixing Li today). In 1810, Qingyun Li, Taoshadang, and Wanzhong Li were reclaimed. Daguan River ends at 14-Pu Pier, at today's Tu Di Gong Temple in Ruixing Li. According to Nanhaixian Zhi (1872), Ruixing Li had become land by siltation, and Daguan River reached only to Guangya Li. By 1954 only the waterway to the west of Niuru Bridge remained. The decline of Xiguan Creek was part of a broader transformation of Guangzhou's urban waterway network during the 20th century. Between 1918 and 1932, the city undertook large-scale road construction, tearing down old city walls and replacing the dominant role of water transport with land-based roads. As inland waterways lost their transportation function, they silted up rapidly and were progressively covered over. Xiguan Creek is connected to the Lychee Bay drainage system, which is composed of several creeks flowing into the Pearl River. The segment of Xiguan Creek from Puntong (泮塘) to the Pearl River forms part of what is now known as Lychee Bay in its modern usage, a historical waterway area dating back approximately 2,200 years.
