= Sampan congee =

Chinese dish

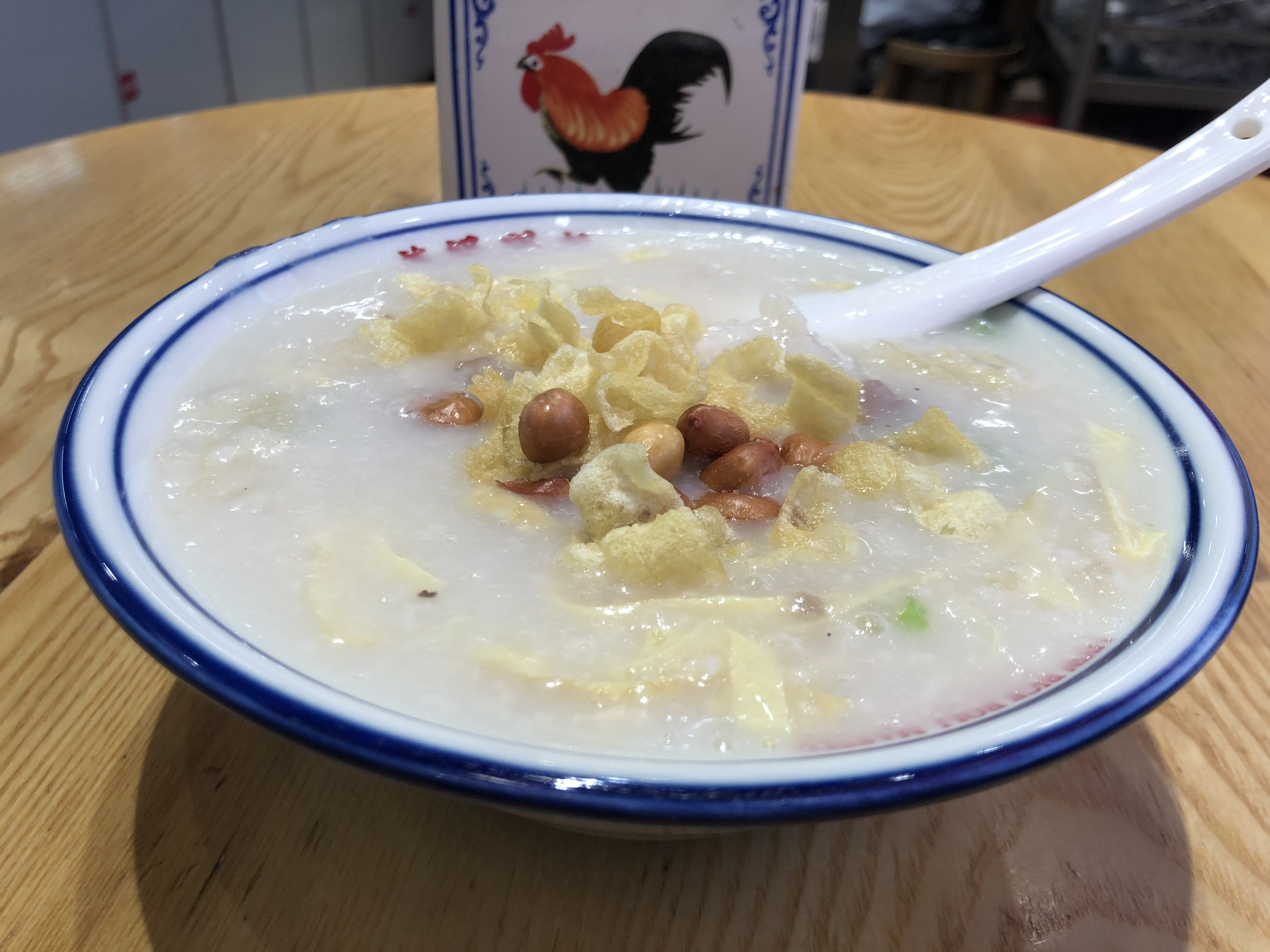
- Sampan congee
- Alternative names: Boat congee
- Type: Congee
- Place of origin: China
- Main ingredients: Rice, pork, fish, shrimp, fried peanuts, etc.

Sampan congee (traditional Chinese: 艇仔粥; pinyin: Ting Zai Zhou, jyutping: Teng5 Zai2 Zuk1) (also called boat congee in English) is a Guangdong congee dish in China, originated in Lychee Bay, Guangzhou (Canton), Guangdong. It is peddled by the sampans cruising on the Pearl River. Selling sampan congee was one of the livelihoods of these boats. Sampan congee is made from rice and pork bones with fried peanuts, fillet of scaly fish, etc.

== History ==
During Qing Dynasty, in Lychee Bay, Guangzhou, the Tanka people who lived on the water first created sampan porridge. Starting as a living place for the Tanka people, sampans later became cruise boats for tourists and served as a hangout for celebrities and litterateurs. While cruising the river, they were served with porridge; as the porridge is served on the sampan, it is called sampan porridge.

== Preparation ==
Boat porridge has a variety of ingredients, which often includes pork, fish, shrimp, fried peanuts, a deep-fried twisted dough stick and scallion. The base of the porridge is made of rice, pork bones, and bean curd, and it is boiled until the water is blended. Wash and slice the raw grass carp and squid and then scald them a few times with scalding water. Then the general practice is to put soy sauce, heated cooking oil, shredded ginger and chopped green onion in a bowl and pour in the cooked congee along with sliced grass carp, shredded squid, sliced cooked duck and chopped vegetables.

== Side dishes ==
- Youtiao, a deep-fried dough fritter.
- Zhaliang, a combination of dough fritter wrapped in a rice roll.

== Nutrition ==
While the calorie content of 100 grams of plain congee is 32 kcal, the calorie content of 100 grams of boat congee is 64 kcal with 0.5g of saturated fat and 0.33g of sugar in it.

== See also ==
- List of porridges
