= Shiqi dialect =

Dialect of Cantonese

Shiqi
- 石岐話
- Native to: Southern China
- Language family: Sino-Tibetan: Sinitic; Chinese; Yue; Yuehai; Zhongshan; Shiqi

Language codes
- ISO 639-3: –
- ISO 639-6: shiq
- Glottolog: None
- Linguasphere: 79-AAA-maf

Shiqi dialect
- Traditional Chinese: 石岐話
- Simplified Chinese: 石岐话
Transcriptions
Standard Mandarin
- Hanyu Pinyin: Shíqíhuà
Yue: Cantonese
- Jyutping: sek6 kei4 waa2

The Shiqi dialect or Shekki dialect is a dialect of Yue Chinese. It is spoken by roughly 160,000 people in Zhongshan, Guangdong's Shiqi urban district. It differs slightly from Standard Cantonese, mainly in its pronunciation and lexicon.

Shiqi has the fewest tones of any Yue dialect, perhaps a Hakka influence.

even		rising	going	entering	
① ˥ 55	② ˥˩ 51	③ ˩˧ 13	⑤ ˨ 22	⑦a ˥ 5	⑧ ˨ 2

This appears to be due to mergers: the fact that the entering tone has split oddly suggests that it has split twice, as in Cantonese and Taishanese, but that tone ⑦b subsequently merged with ⑧.
