= Guiyuan Community, Zhongshan =

Guiyuan Community 桂园社区
- Residential Community
- Country: China
- Province: Guangdong
- Prefecture-level city: Zhongshan
- Subdistrict: Shiqi Subdistrict, Guangdong

Area
  - Total: 1.5 km^{2} (0.58 sq mi)

Population
  - Total: 10,794

Guiyuan Community (simplified Chinese: 桂园社区; traditional Chinese: 桂園社區; pinyin: Guìyuán Shèqū) is a residential community in Shiqi Subdistrict, Zhongshan, Guangdong, China. Created in November 2004, the residential community spans an area of 1.5 square kilometres (0.58 mi^{2}), and has a permanent population of 10,794. Guiyuan Community occupies part of Zhongshan's old city.

== History ==
The current iteration of Guiyuan Community was established in November 2004 as a merger between three now-defunct residential communities.

== Education ==
Guiyuan Community has three major schools: Zhongshan Huaqiao Middle School (Chinese: 中山市华侨中学), Shiqi District Experimental Primary School (Chinese: 石岐区实验小学), and Shiqi District East Gate Primary School (Chinese: 石岐区东门小学).

== Economy ==
As of 2019, the residential community is home to three markets and two department stores.
