= Jiujiang dialect =

Yuehai Chinese dialect

Jiujiang
- 九江话 / 九江話
- Native to: Southern China
- Region: Jiujiang, Foshan
- Native speakers: (50,000 cited 2000)
- Language family: Sino-Tibetan: Sinitic; Chinese; Yue; Yuehai; Sanyi; Jiujiang

Language codes
- ISO 639-3: –
- Glottolog: None

The Jiujiang dialect (simplified Chinese: 九江话; traditional Chinese: 九江話; pinyin: Jiǔjiānghuà) is a variety of Cantonese spoken in Jiujiang Town, in Nanhai District, Foshan, Guangdong. A few words differ from Standard Cantonese, but generally other Cantonese speakers can understand Jiujiang dialect without difficulty.

Here are some differences between the Jiujiang dialect and the Guangzhou dialect:

English	Juijiang dialect	Guangzhou dialect
I	𠊎 /ŋai˧˥/	我 /ŋɔ˩˧/
we	𠊎岭 / 𠊎嶺 /ŋai˧˥ lɛŋ˩˨/	我哋 /ŋɔ˩˧ tei˨/
good	好 hao	好 /hou˧˥/
see	见 / 見 gan	见 / 見 /kin˧/
at	daa	喺 /hɐi˧˥/
