= Xiguan dialect =

Dialect of Cantonese

Xiguan
- Native to: Mainland China
- Region: Xiguan, Liwan District, Guangzhou, Guangdong
- Language family: Sino-Tibetan: Sinitic; Chinese; Yue; Yuehai; Cantonese; Xiguan

Language codes
- ISO 639-3: –
- Glottolog: None

The Xiguan dialect, or Sai Kwan dialect (Chinese: 西關話; Jyutping: sai1 gwaan1 waa2), is the prestige dialect of Cantonese originated from Xiguan (Sai Kwan), Guangzhou.

== Differences with downtown accent ==
=== Differences in the pronunciation of some characters ===
Xiguan Accent	Downtown Accent	English
han3 (瞓)覺 (close to the ancient pronunciation of "睏")	fan3 (瞓)覺	to sleep
ji1 (依)家	ji4 (而)家	now
ji1 (依)個	ni1 (呢)個	this, these

=== Confusion of consonants n & l ===
Due to Xiguan's near geographical position to Nanhai, both accents spoken in Xiguan and Nanhai feature n-l merger, in which /n/ and /l/ are merged into /l/. However, the feature is less prominent in the Xiguan accent.

=== Consonant ng ===
Speakers of Xiguan Accents pronounce the zero consonant as the consonant ng, for instance, "屋 (uk7)" as "nguk7" and "壓 (aat8)" as "ngaat8".

=== Vowels i & ei / ai ===
Speakers of Xiguan Accents pronounce vowels ei and ai as i. The phenomenon also lies in Nanhai Accents, such as:

Character	Xiguan Accent	Downtown Accent	English
使	si2	sai2	to make, to cause, to use
死	si2	sei2	to die
四	si3	sei3	four
嘶	si1	sai1 (increasingly read as si1 rather than sai1, influenced by Mandarin)	neigh, hiss

=== Dental consonant ===
Additionally, speakers of Xiguan Accents enhance dental consonants. That is to say, downtown people pronounce "知", "雌" and "斯" as [tɕi], [tɕʰi] and [ɕi] (comparatively relaxed in the oral area, close to [tɕ], [tɕʰ] and [ɕ] in IPA; and yet Speakers of Xiguan Accents pronounce [tsi], [tsʰi] and [si] (The tip of tongue pushes up against upper teeth and blocks up air current. Tense in the oral area, similar to zh, ch and sh in Mandarin without rolling tongue). To be precise, dental consonants are similar to the consonants of 左", "初" and "所" (i.e., [ts], [tsʰ] and [s]) in Downtown Accents. In summary, speakers of Xiguan Accents pronounce [tɕ], [tɕʰ] and [ɕ] as [ts], [tsʰ] and [s]. A saying representing Xiguan Accents goes that Servant, take some money to buy some seadless kaki fruits (亞"四"，擰幾毫"紙"，去買啲水"柿").

== Status ==
=== Relationship with downtown accents (especially Dongshan accents) ===
Xiguan lies to the west of Taiping Gate (Chinese: 太平門; pinyin: Tàipíng Mén; Jyutping: Taai3 Ping4 Mun4; lit. 'Peace and Security Gate'). Xiguan is the suburb of Guangzhou and it was administered by Nanhai County rather than Panyu County (covering former Yuexiu District and former Dongshan District). Therefore, it was not regarded as part of the capital of Guangdong Province. Therefore, Xiguan Dialect should be regarded as suburban accents, distinguished from Downtown Accent (城內音; sing4 noi6 jam1), esp. Dongshan Accents (東山口音; dung1 saan1 hau2 jam1). Notwithstanding, Xiguan lies close to the provincial capital, so the gap is narrow.
