= Shangxiajiu Pedestrian Street =

Street in Guangzhou, China

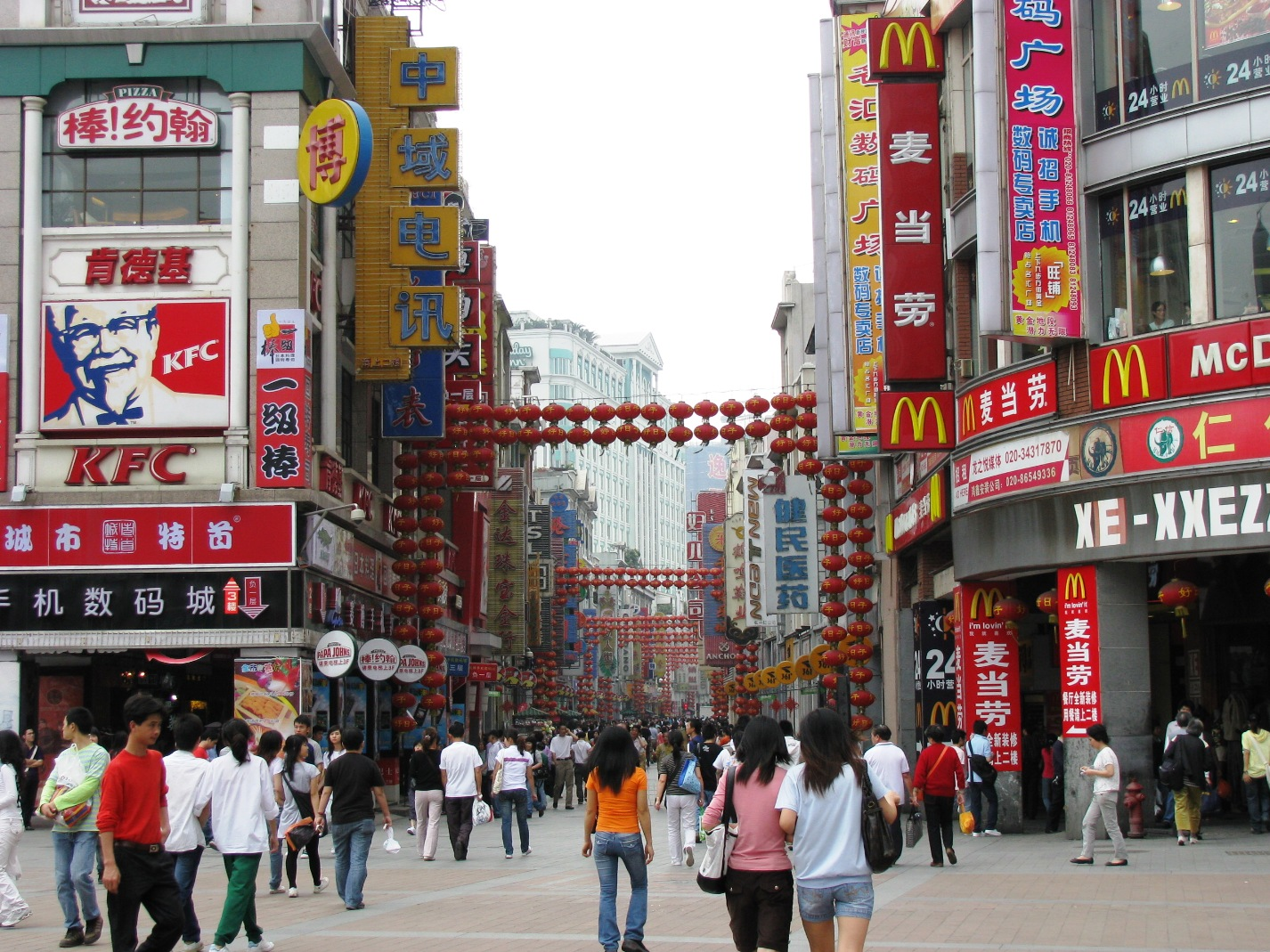
Shangxiajiu Pedestrian Street

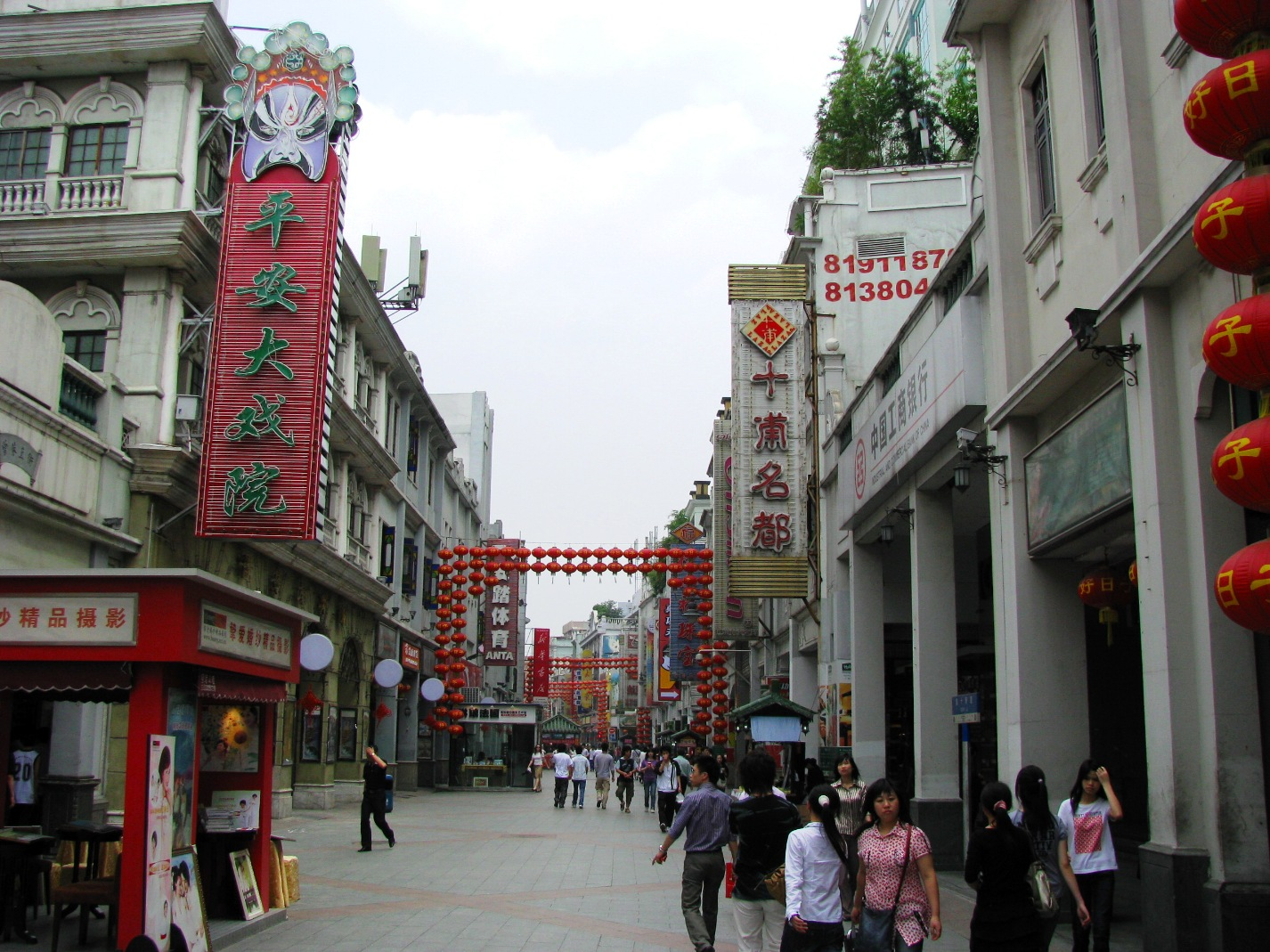
Dishifu Road

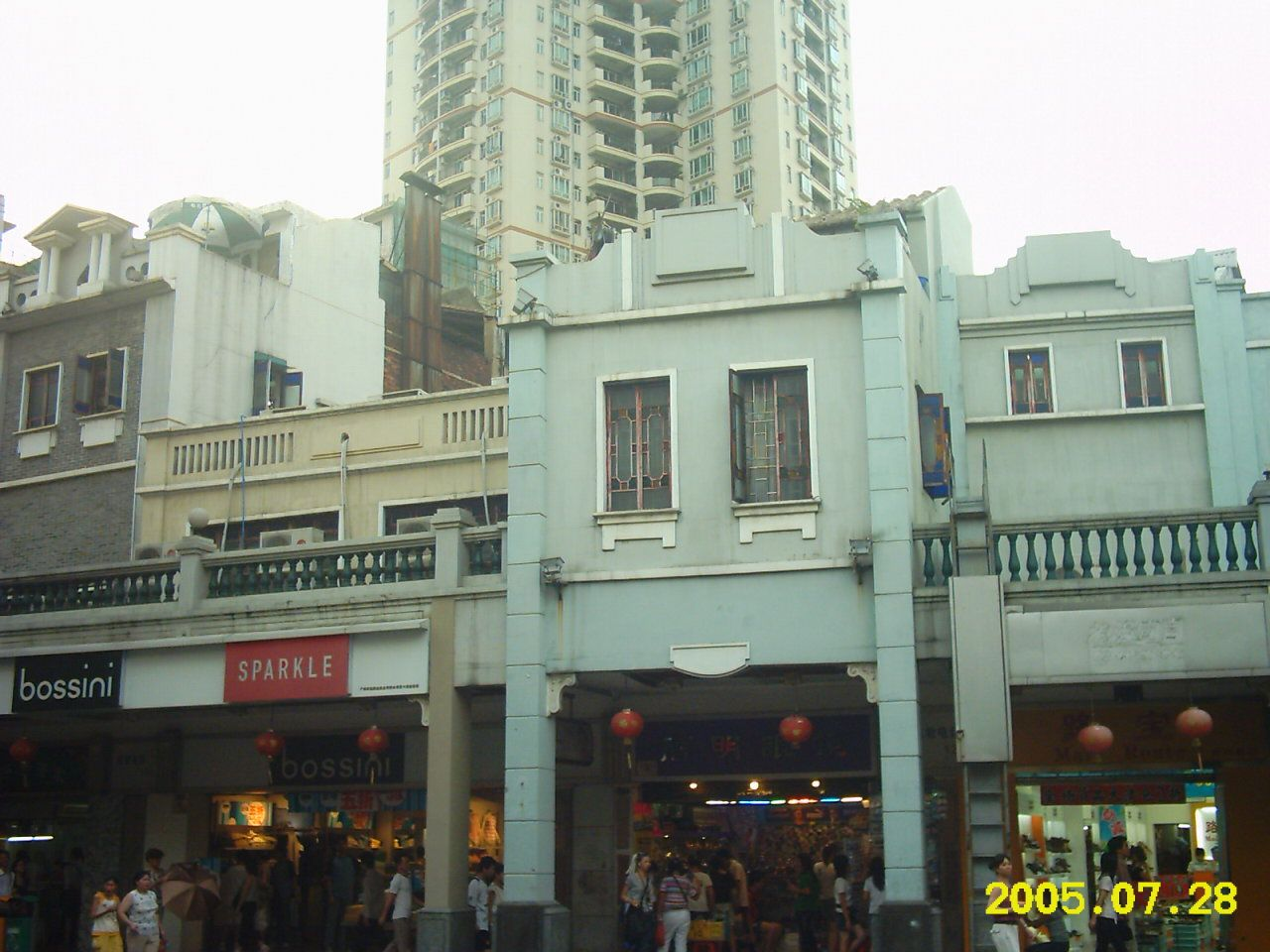
Architecture along Shangxiajiu

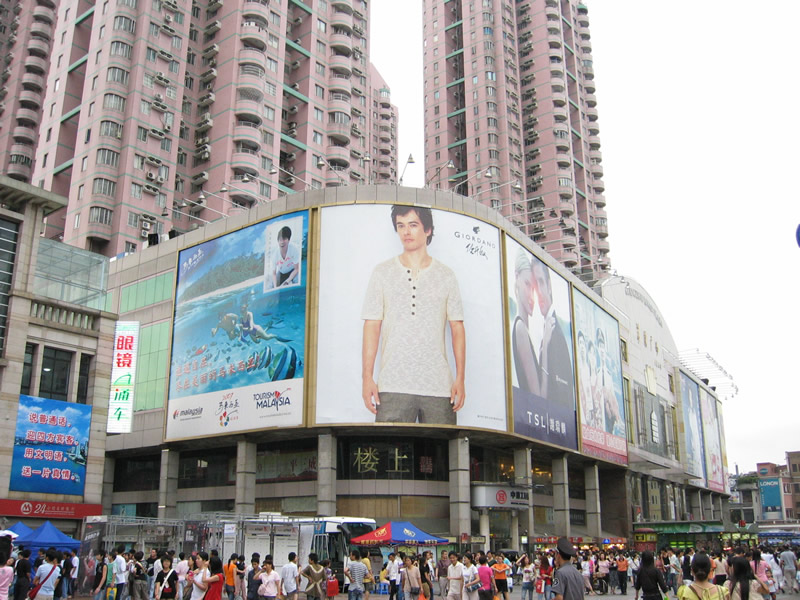
Liwan Plaza in Shangxiajiu

Shangxiajiu Pedestrian Street (Chinese: 上下九步行街; pinyin: shàngxiàjiǔ bùxíngjiē; Jyutping: Soeng^{6}haa^{6}gau^{2} Bou^{6}hang^{4}gaai^{1}), or simply as Shangxiajiu (Chinese: 上下九), is a commercial pedestrian street in Liwan District, Guangzhou, Guangdong, China. It is the first business street in Guangzhou, and it opened in September 1995.

== Location ==
Located in the old town of Xiguan (Chinese: 西关; Jyutping: Sai1 Gwaan1), it stretches from Shangjiu Road (Chinese: 上九路) and Xiajiu Road (Chinese: 下九路) in the east to Dishifu Road (Chinese: 第十甫路; Jyutping: Dai6 Sap6 Pou2 Lou6) in the west, and traverses Baohua Road (Chinese: 寶華路; Jyutping: Bou2 Waa4 Lou6) and Wenchang Road (Chinese: 文昌路; Jyutping: Man4 Coeng1 Lou6), about 1,200 meters (3,900 ft) long with more than 300 shops.

Shangxiajiu is composed of the unique and historical architecture based on Tong Lau and teahouses, featuring the characteristics of European and Chinese styles. It has a group of old famous stores, such as the Guangzhou Garment Store, the Herring Shoes and Hats Store, and the Dalu Clock and Watch Store. It also has some well-known restaurants, including the Guangzhou Restaurant (廣州酒家), the Taotaoju Restaurant (陶陶居), Wenchang Chicken (文昌雞), and Taotao Ginger and Onion Chicken (薑蔥雞).

== See also ==
- List of tourist attractions in China
