= Yuehai Yue =

Family of dialects of Yue Chinese, related to Cantonese

Yuehai
- 粵海
- Native to: China
- Region: Pearl River Delta, Guangdong
- Native speakers: (13 million? cited 1998)
- Language family: Sino-Tibetan: Sinitic; Chinese; Yue; Yuehai
- Dialects: Guangfu; Sanyi; Xiangshan; Guanbao

Language codes
- ISO 639-3: None (mis)
- Glottolog: yueh1236
- Linguasphere: 79-AAA-ma
- The four main Yuehai languages, at right, are shaded in pink

Yuehai (Chinese: 粵海; Jyutping: jyut6 hoi2; pinyin: Yuèhǎi) is the main branch of Yue Chinese, spoken in the Pearl River Delta of the province of Guangdong, as well as Hong Kong and Macau. It is commonly called Cantonese, though that name is more precisely applied to the Guangzhou topolect of Yuehai.

== Topolects ==
Yuehai is divided into four principal dialects, each of which contains various subdialects. Cantonese is the prestige form.

- Cantonese dialects
  - Guangzhou dialect
  - Hong Kong dialect
  - Macau dialect
  - Xiguan dialect
  - Wuzhou dialect
  - Tanka dialect
- Sanyi / Nanpanshun dialects
  - Nanhai dialect
  - Jiujiang dialect
  - Xiqiao dialect
  - Shunde dialect
- Xiangshan dialect
  - Shiqi dialect
  - Sanjiao dialect
- Guanbao dialect
  - Dongguan dialect
  - Bao'an dialect (Waitau)
