= Kang's Family =

Cantonese sitcom

- Official poster in 2000
- Also known as: Migrant Wives, Local Husbands.
- 外地媳妇本地郎
- Genre: Family, Comedy
- Written by: Ding Xiaoshu (Ding Lei), Xu Danhua, etc.
- Directed by: Lu Xiaoguang (Chief Director); Wang Gang; Liu Weiping; Yang Jianian; Chen Yaoxiang
- Starring: Gong Jintang, Huang Jinshang, Su Zhidan, Ding Ling, Guo Chang, Hu Yanfen, Liu Tao, etc. (see #Cast)
- Country of origin: China
- Original language: Mainly Cantonese
- No. of episodes: 4382

Production
- Production location: China Guangzhou City
- Production companies: Guangdong Radio and Television; Guangdong Guangshi Media Co., Ltd.

Original release
- Network: GRT Pearl River Channel
- Release: November 4, 2000

Related
- In-Laws, Out-Laws (Movie version); I'm going to a foreign show (Derivative variety show)

Kang's Family
- Simplified Chinese: 外来媳妇本地郎
Transcriptions
Standard Mandarin
- Hanyu Pinyin: Wai Lai Xi Fu Ben Di Lang

Kang's Family; Migrant Wives, Local Husbands (Chinese: 外来媳妇本地郎) Subtitles in Chinese produced by Hong Kong's TVB Jade for Cantonese broadcasts, and in Cantonese, "媳婦" refers to a son's wife. is a Cantonese sitcom produced by Guangdong Radio and Television. Filming began on April 18, 2000, and has been broadcast on GRT Pearl River Channel since November 4, 2000, with two episodes on Saturdays and Sundays at 19:00. It is the longest-running and most frequently aired sitcom in Chinese television history. As of May 15, 2021, the show has aired more than 4,000 episodes.

In early 2008, the production was awarded the title of "National Advanced Collective of Radio, Film and Television System" jointly by the Ministry of Personnel and the State Administration of Radio, Film and Television. In addition, this play is also seen by Hunan Radio and Television Station via video channel as a remake of the Xiang Chinese sitcom "The Old and the Young Goes Forward." (Chinese: 一家老小向前冲).

== Production ==
The play began shooting on April 18, 2000, and premiered on GRT Pearl River Channel on November 4 of the same year. It had broadcast 1,000 episodes on February 12, 2006. More than 2,000 episodes were broadcast on October 2, 2011, and more than 3,000 episodes were broadcast on July 17, 2016. The play is the longest-lived TV series in China at present, and it is also the highest in Guangdong audience rating over the years. According to Information Times, the ratings survey data of China Central Television CSM (China Guangshi Sofrey Media Research) institutions show that the average audience rating of the play has been in double digits, and in 2002, it historically set a record of 41.39% in Guangdong Province. Occupying the championship at the same time for a long time, the report believes that this is the first time that "the situation of Guangdong screen being monopolized by Hong Kong TV program has been broken all year round.

In 2008, a number of "best" Chinese TVs were created: the number of episodes of similar TV series in China was the largest, the longest broadcast time, the highest ratings, and the advertising had the best benefits. The play has a direct investment of 7 million yuan every year, but the income reaches more than 100 million.

Lu Xiaoguang, the chief director, recalled at the celebration of the show's 8th anniversary that the beds, sofas, cabinets, and other furniture in the play were brought by the staff from their homes. He also said that he wanted to finish 60 episodes at the beginning, and did not expect the show to become so popular and to continue filming.

According to director Lu Xiaoguang, 80% to 90% of Cantonese-speaking actors or hosts in Guangzhou have appeared in the show, as well as actors from the Cantonese Drama Troupe, Guangzhou Drama Troupe and Foshan Drama Troupe. In recent years, there have also been contestants of "Maiwang Hegemony " and "Dingwang Hegemony" on camera.

In July 2018, it was filmed in 16:9 HD format, and in December of the same year, a special "Spring Blossoms" was released, replacing the original version, which had been used for more than 20 years.

== Synopsis ==
The Kangbo family, who lives on Changsheng Street in Xiguan, Liwan District, Guangzhou, has four sons. Unexpectedly, the four sons all marry women from outside the region. The second son, Kang Qizong, marries Chaoshan's daughter-in-law; the third son, Kang Qiyao, marries a Shanghainese woman; and the fourth son, Kang Qizu, marries a foreign woman. Family members from all over the world live in the same house, and a series of comedic events occur. With the development of Guangzhou and the changes of the times, the neighbors of Kangjia and Changsheng Street experience the ups and downs of life together.

=== The ending of Kang Qizong ===
Kang Qizong (Guo Chang) became the first major character to die in the show. His ending was reputed in two episodes broadcast on May 25, 2019, which attracted the attention of audiences in Guangdong Province, so he was even listed on the Sina Weibo hot search list. The audience reacted positively to the ending of the role of Kang Qizong.

== Cast ==
=== Kang family members ===
Actor	Role	Character Profile
Gong Jintang	Kang Ershou	Lao Kang, Ashou 1935年9月7日出生 The former head of the Kang family, the husband of Wang Yulian RetireRestaurantCertified public accountant, born in the Xiguan family. Carefully calculated, stingy, face-loving, overly autocratic Due to the growing age of the actors, the number of performances has been gradually reduced in recent years. In the plot, the two elders have been arranged to move to a nursing home, and the list of performances at the end of the film has been changed from starring to a friendly guest appearance since 2019.
Huang Jinshang	Wang Yulian	Aunt Kang, Master KangHousewives, kind-hearted, a little confused and forgetful Due to the growing age of the actors, the number of performances has been gradually reduced in recent years. In the plot, the two elders have been arranged to move to a nursing home, and the list of performances at the end of the film has been changed from starring to a friendly guest appearance since 2019.
Li Yanling	Thin mother	A Zhuan, Xi MaKang and Shou's father's second wife is about 30 years old. After her husband died, she went from Guangzhou to settle in Hong Kong, and then adopted Kangerli.
Mao Yongzhi	Kang'erli	CoCoThe adopted daughter of Kang's mother She is capricious and playful, talented and intelligent, loves to command others, loves fashion, and is often reprimanded by the head teacher at school.
Wu Haijie	Lie Youyin	Brother YouyinHe first met Kang Li in 2011, and later became his boyfriend and got married in mid-2019. One of the coffee shop owners
Su Zhidan	Kang Qiguang	A GuangHe is honest and introverted. He is often tricked by his younger brother Kang Qizong. Almost all the utensils and manual labor at home are done by him. He often has the experience of being deceived, but sometimes he does the right thing and loves watching football. In episode 2581 and Chang Xianglan, he set up Languang Express and served as the boss. The original intention was to pick up express delivery for the inconvenient elderly in the community.
Ding Ling	Chang Xianglan	XianglanFormer Ruhao Tea Restaurant → a family restaurant employee, and later became the owner of a hair salon A girl from the suburbs of Henan Sanmenxia City is smart, capable, strong in work, simple and kind, and sometimes has a sense of inferiority towards herself.
Zhang Wenbo	Kang Tianyou	Tian YouThe second grandson of Kangershou and Wang Yulian After birth, he first lived in Xianglan's family, and then returned to Guangzhou to live with the Kang family.
Guo Chang Zhou Xiaobin	Kang Qizong	A Zong, Zong Zai, Zong GeDied in 2009 Ruhao Tea Restaurant → Family Restaurant Boss The former owner of Yuxing hardware store, who graduated from high school, often talked about the saying that he was uneducated. He is eductive and a little cunning. He is often called "city slang" by his neighbors and even his family together with Su Miaochan. People are afraid of losing money, and they can always think of many strange schemes for different things (but sometimes they will be self-defeating). I often go out to do business with people in the north. In fact, in 2009, he was found to be terminally ill. Because he didn't want to increase the burden on his wife and family, he went to Paradise Island to spend the rest of his life. He even divorced Su Miao for the above reasons, and finally died on Paradise Island. After that, Kangershou and Wang Yuliankang went to Paradise Island to bring their ashes back to the countryside of Shunde, and kept the secret to the Kang family for ten years. I left a letter to my son Tianfu before I was alive.
Hu Yanfen	Su Miaochan	Achan, Aunt ChanThe wife of Kang Qizong From Chaoshan area, often called "Shiyu", he is particularly nervous about money, is very shrewd and pragmatic in making money and doing business, and likes to be greedy for small advantages. At the same time, she can speak fluent Chaozhou dialect and Guangzhou dialect, but I only speak Cantonese in daily life (including dialogue with her parents).
Li Junyi	Kang Tianyou	Tianyou, YouzaiSon of Kang Qizong and Su Miaochan He was a primary school student. He experienced middle school, college and entered the society. He has been acting until now. He is often a naughty and spoiled child. Sometimes they fall out because they don't agree with their parents. One of the coffee shop owners in WeChat Moments At the end of 2018, he went to Vegas to meet Luo Feiyan, and then began to date and got married in 2019.
Liu Yingying	Luo Feiyan	A Yan, Fei YanKang Tianyou's wife Chinese from Brazil can speak fluent Putonghua and Guangzhou At the end of 2018, he met Kang Tianyou in Vegas, then started dating, and got married in 2019.
Lai Jialun	Cheng Tianle	After entering the Kang family, he was treated kindly by Su Miao, which led to Kang Tianyou's jealousy and made up. For the son of a good friend of Kang Qizong who met on Paradise Island, in return for the cornea donated by Kang Qizong, he took care of the two elders.
Peng Xinzhi	Kang Qiyao	A Yao, Chief KangThe younger brother of Kang Qiguang and Kang Qizong The director of an organ Graduates of TV University are humorous and a little addicted to officials. They often publish governmentnews or interpret news news materials at home.
Liu Tao	Hu Xingzi	Kang Qiyao's former wife Cousin of Zeng Youmei Beautiful and shrewd, she always thinks that Guangzhou is "the countryside"
Fion Qian	Huang Fei	Afei, FeifeiCivil servant of government agency, now director of trade union Kang Qiyao's subordinates and wife She once had a discord with Kang Qiyao, then made up, and then began to date and get married.
He Wenyin	Kang Zhizi	Zhi Zi The daughter of Kang Qiyao and Hu Xingzi Born in Japan and raised by his biological mother Xingzi In 2006, she returned to Guangzhou to settle down and moved into the Kang family.
Xu Ruoqi	Kang Qizu	Mark, Azu (Joe) Diana's ex-husband The core staff of Xiyangyang Film and Television Company became the boss until he retired from Brother Niu in 2019. Jinan University graduates preside over the MBA. He used to be a foreign project white-collar worker. He is a young man full of modern atmosphere. He makes a wide range of friends and has many ghost ideas. He often comes up with ghost ideas to trick his colleagues, so he is often retaliated by his colleagues.
Hao Lianlu	Diana	DianaKang Paul's biological mother Employees of foreign companies From United StatesCalifornia, speaking Guangzhou dialect with an English accent in the play She is caring, but she is also easy to be deceived. Due to cultural differences, there are often disagreements on the living habits and ways of teaching children of Kang Qizu and the Kang family.
Wang Chen	Kang Qizu	The son of Diana In 2003, the 481st episode part 1 mentioned that he was born in the United States and appeared in the second half of the same episode.
Lin Xingyun	Wang Wenbing	A Bing, cousin BingWang Yulian's nephew and cousin of the four Kang brothers From time to time, he appeared in front of the Kang family in different professional capacities, and even cheated the Kang family's property and was scolded by the Kang family.
Liao Dongmei	Li Cai'e	A'eWang Wenbing's wife, the cousin-in-law of the four Kang brothers, divorced in episode 1811 in 2010, and then remarried in episode 2,662 in 2014. Before the divorce, he shared a pig farm with Wang Wenbing.
Lu Haichao	Su Weiai	Sir Su, Mr. Su, FatherThe father-in-law of Kang Qizong In the 4389th episode of 2023, when a leaf falls, his death was explained.
Lu Qiuping	He Erfang	Mother/Ma DaSu Xi'er's grandmother Due to the growing age of the actors, the number of performances has been gradually reduced in recent years.
Chen Jianxiong	Su Guiyuan	Guiyuan, A DeeIn the play, speak Cantonese with Chaozhou accent He is more male chaU.S. Due to the discord between sister and brother, Wu Duomei and Wu Duomei formed their own Chaozhou Restaurant to compete with the family restaurant. After the conciliating, they merged two restaurants in 1062 episodes in 2006, using the name of "Ruhao Restaurant", and later renamed it as a family restaurant. When Changsheng Street was demolished and rebuilt, the restaurant was closed, and "Suji Shiduo" was opened in Liejia Village, which was closed when it moved back to Changsheng Street. Now the 007 convenience store is reopened next to the hotel in Liwan → local Lang convenience store
Chen Ge	Wu Duomei	May, Fat GirlAppearance and behavior are quite manly. Strong learning ability, good at repair, cooking and baking, even acupuncture, massage and other skills.
Zhang Qiandong	Su Xi'er	Xi'erThe granddaughter of Su Weiai and He Erfang
Lu Junyu	Su Jintian	A TianLiving in Chaozhou, he was adopted by Su Weiai and He Erfang as his son when he was a child. After Guiyuan was born, he returned to his biological parents' home due to misunderstanding. After many years, He Erfang, Su Miaochan and Wu Duomei invited him to settle down in Guangzhou and move into the Su family.
Zhao Shilin	Huang Sheng	Kang Qiyao's father-in-law
Tengying	Huang Tai	Kang Qiyao's mother-in-law
Hei Zeen	Dai Xichen	Kang Qizu's father-in-law, Diana's father He has divorced Diana's mother and has repeatedly expressed his desire to change gender.
Li Cuicui	He Aiqun	Su Miaochan's old classmate and in-law, at the beginning, he was at peace with him, and finally made up.
Ma Xiaoqian	Zeng Yumei	YumiShe is fluent in Cantonese, and there have been a lot of Cantonese dialogues in the episodes since 2006.
Zhou Zilin	Duoduo	Zeng Yumei's daughter
Huang Junying	Fu Chuanlong	The trousers are wornMaster Su Guiyuan's master is often tricked and happy. He is naturally afraid of his wife. His wife's voice is like Bai Gujing (祝師奶)

== Other versions ==
=== Movie version ===
- In-Laws, Out-Laws, director of Gao Zhisen. Starring Zeng Zhiwei, Shen Dianxia and Yu Wenle, it was released in 2004.

=== Hunan version ===
- The Old and the Young Goes Forward(Chinese: 一家老小向前冲), adapted from the original script of "Migrant Wives, Local Husbands", it premiered in 2004 in Hunan Economic TV.
