= Shiqi Subdistrict, Guangdong =

Shiqi 石岐街道 Shekki
- Subdistrict
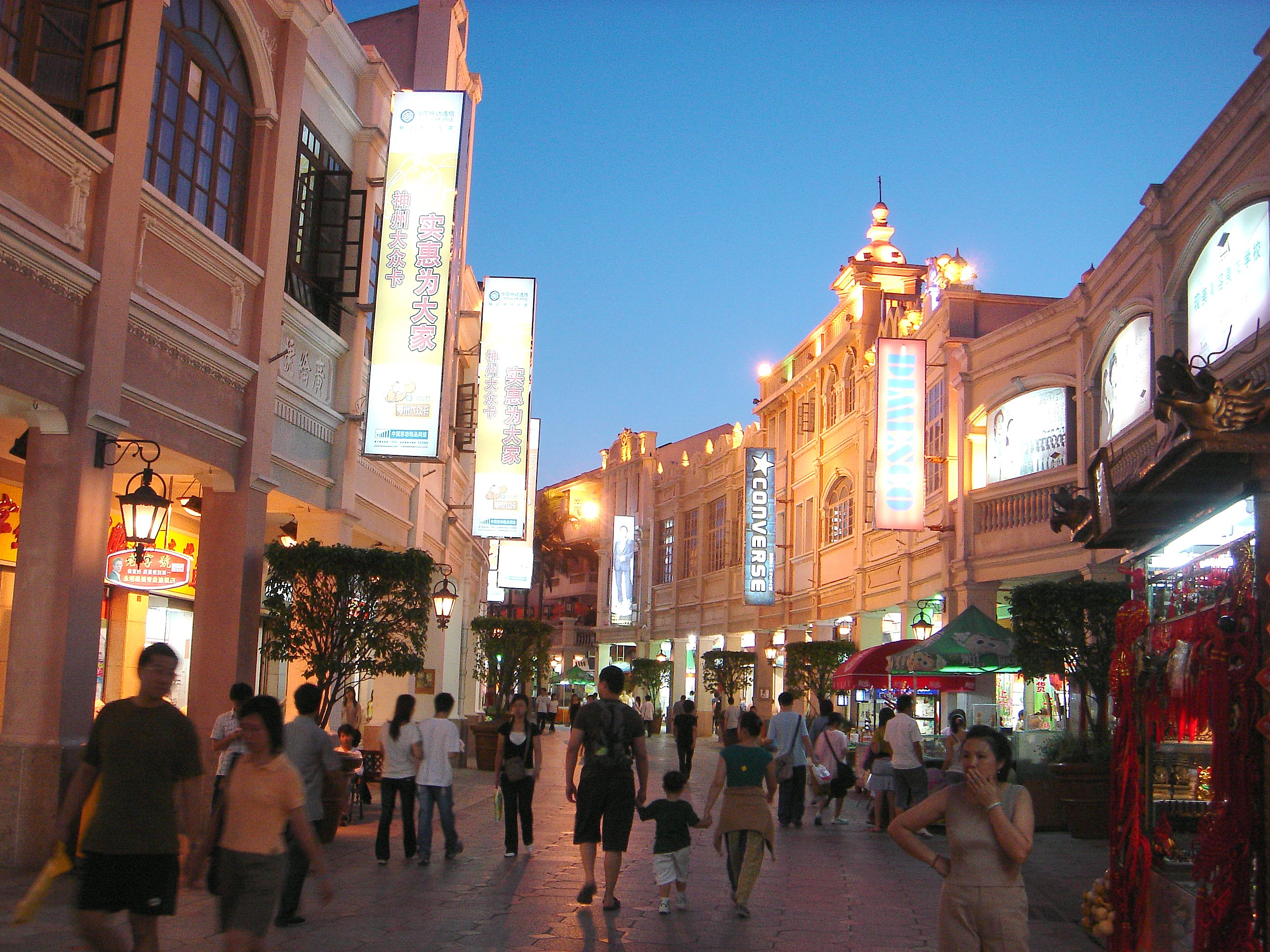
- Sunwen West Road (孙文西路) in Shiqi Subistrict

- Shiqi Subdistrict is labelled "4" on this map of Zhongshan

- Location in Guangdong
- Coordinates: 22.32°N 113.21°E
- Country: People's Republic of China
- Province: Guangdong
- Prefecture-level city: Zhongshan

Area
  - Total: 22.72 km^{2} (8.77 sq mi)

Population (2020)
  - Total: 257,472
  - Density: 11,330/km^{2} (29,350/sq mi)
- Time zone: UTC+8 (China Standard)

Shiqi Subdistrict, Guangdong
- Chinese: 石岐
- Traditional Chinese: 石岐
- Jyutping: sek6 kei4
- Hanyu Pinyin: Shíqí
- Postal: Shekki
Transcriptions
Standard Mandarin
- Hanyu Pinyin: Shíqí
Yue: Cantonese
- Jyutping: sek6 kei4

Shiqi Subdistrict, also known as Shiqiqu Subdistrict, is a subdistrict located in the center of Zhongshan city, covering an area of 22.72 square kilometres (8.77 mi^{2}), and a population of 257,472 (2020). The subdistrict administers 19 residential communities, and is home to major industrial and commercial activity.

Shiqi was historically spelled Shekki in English, and is nicknamed Tiecheng (鐵城; Tiěchéng; 'Iron City').

Local people mainly speak the Shiqi dialect, a Yue dialect related to Standard Cantonese.

== Geography ==
The subdistrict is located at the foot of Yandun Mountain (烟墩山). The Qi River (Chinese: 岐江; pinyin: Qí Jiāng) is the primary river in the subdistrict.

== Administrative subdivisions ==
As of 2020, Shiqi has administrative jurisdiction over the following 19 residential communities (Chinese: 社区):

| Name | Hanzi | Pinyin |
|---|---|---|
| Guiyuan Community | 桂园社区 | Guìyuán Shèqū |
| Minzu Community | 民族社区 | Mínzú Shèqū |
| Taiping Community | 太平社区 | Tàipíng Shèqū |
| Lianxin Community | 莲新社区 | Liánxīn Shèqū |
| Yingyang Community | 迎阳社区 | Yíngyáng Shèqū |
| Xianhu Community | 仙湖社区 | Xiānhú Shèqū |
| Hubin Community | 湖滨社区 | Húbīn Shèqū |
| Yuelainan Community | 悦来南社区 | Yuèláinán Shèqū |
| Fengming Community | 凤鸣社区 | Fèngmíng Shèqū |
| Dongming Community | 东明社区 | Dōngmíng Shèqū |
| Bo'ai Community | 博爱社区 | Bó'ài Shèqū |
| Minquan Community | 民权社区 | Mínquán Shèqū |
| Minsheng Community | 民生社区 | Mínshēng Shèqū |
| Hongji Community | 宏基社区 | Hóngjī Shèqū |
| Lianyuan Community | 莲员社区 | Liányuán Shèqū |
| Kanghua Community | 康华社区 | Kānghuá Shèqū |
| Daxin Community | 大信社区 | Dàxìn Shèqū |
| Lianxing Community | 莲兴社区 | Liánxìng Shèqū |
| Donggangwan Community | 东港湾社区 | Dōnggǎngwān Shèqū |

== Demographics ==
The subdistrict has a permanent population of about 227,200.

As of 2006, Shiqi Subdistrict had a permanent population of 169,400 and migrant population of 40,900.

== Economy ==
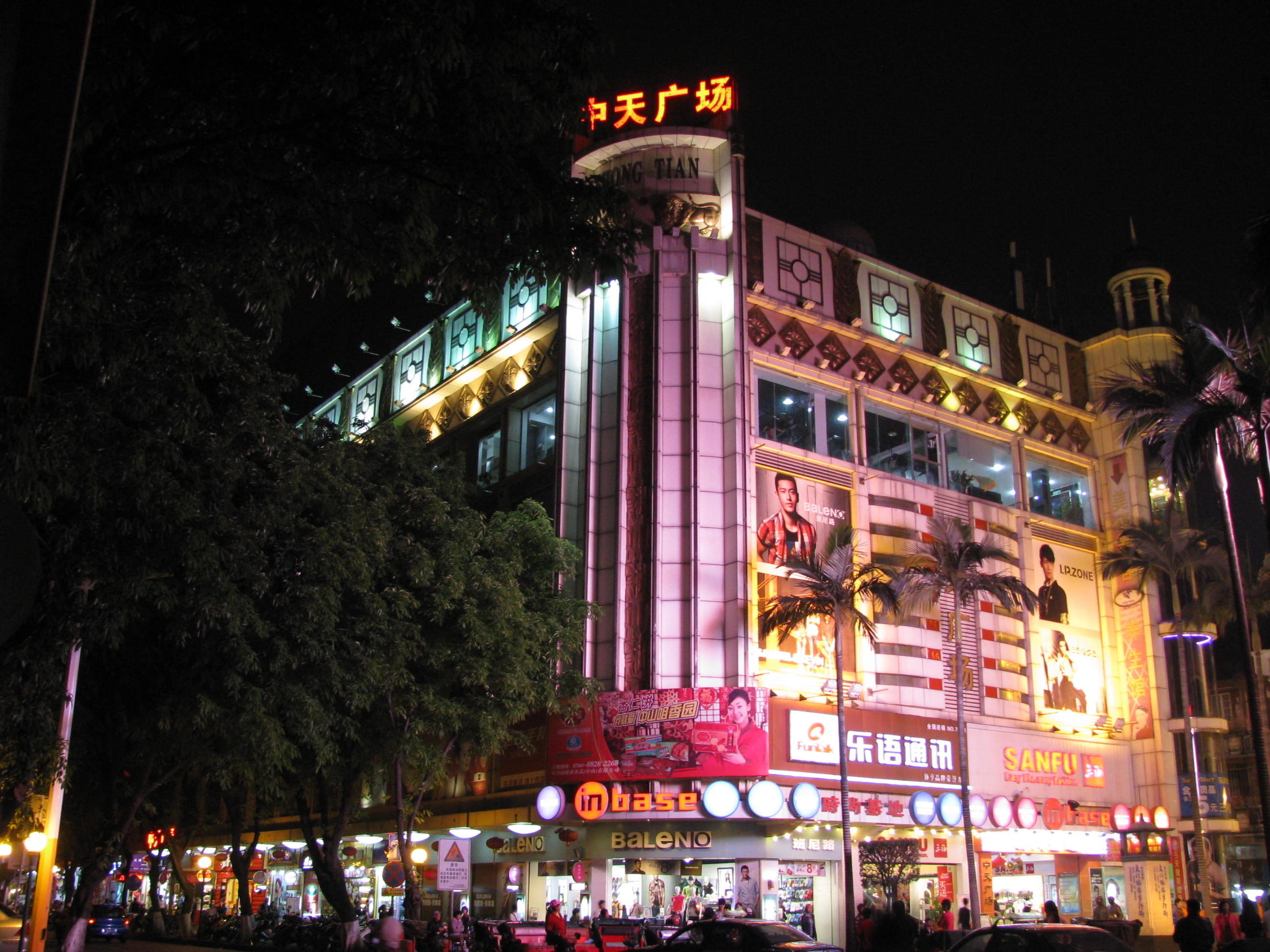
The Zhongtian Square Shopping Center at night

In recent years, Shiqi Subdistrict has attracted a number of national firms involves with financial and information services. The subdistrict is also home to a nationally-significant industrial park, the Guangdong Zhongshan Industrial Park.

In 2019, the subdistrict's gross domestic product grew 1.4%. As of 2019, retail sales in the subdistrict totaled ¥31.164 billion, tax revenue in the subdistrict totaled ¥4.534 billion, and foreign trade in the subdistrict totaled ¥17.695 billion. Shiqi's retail sales ranks first among township-level divisions in Zhongshan.

Statistics from 2006 report that the subdistrict hosts 11,767 unique enterprises.

== Education ==
The Zhongshan Institute of the University of Electronic Science and Technology of China is located in Shiqi Subdistrict.

== Transportation ==
Located in the Pearl River Delta, Shiqi Subdistrict lies in close proximity to a number of major cities. The subdistrict is 40 kilometres (25 mi) south of Guangzhou, and 57 kilometres (35 mi) north of Macau.

=== Road ===
Both National Highway 105 and the Beijing-Zhuhai Expressway pass through the western parts of Shiqi Subdistrict.

Shiqi Subdistrict is currently served by the following bus lines operated by the Zhongshan Public Transportation Group Co.:

| Bus Number | Start End | Time |
|---|---|---|
| 006 | Zhongshan Bus Terminal - Changjiang Aquatic Park | 06:20–22:00 |
| 015 | Shongshan North Railway Station - Malin | 06:40–19:00 |
| 050 | Bo'ai Hospital - Aoyuan | 06:30–22:00 |
| 061 | Shongshan Railway Station - Sun City | 06:30–21:30 |

=== Rail ===
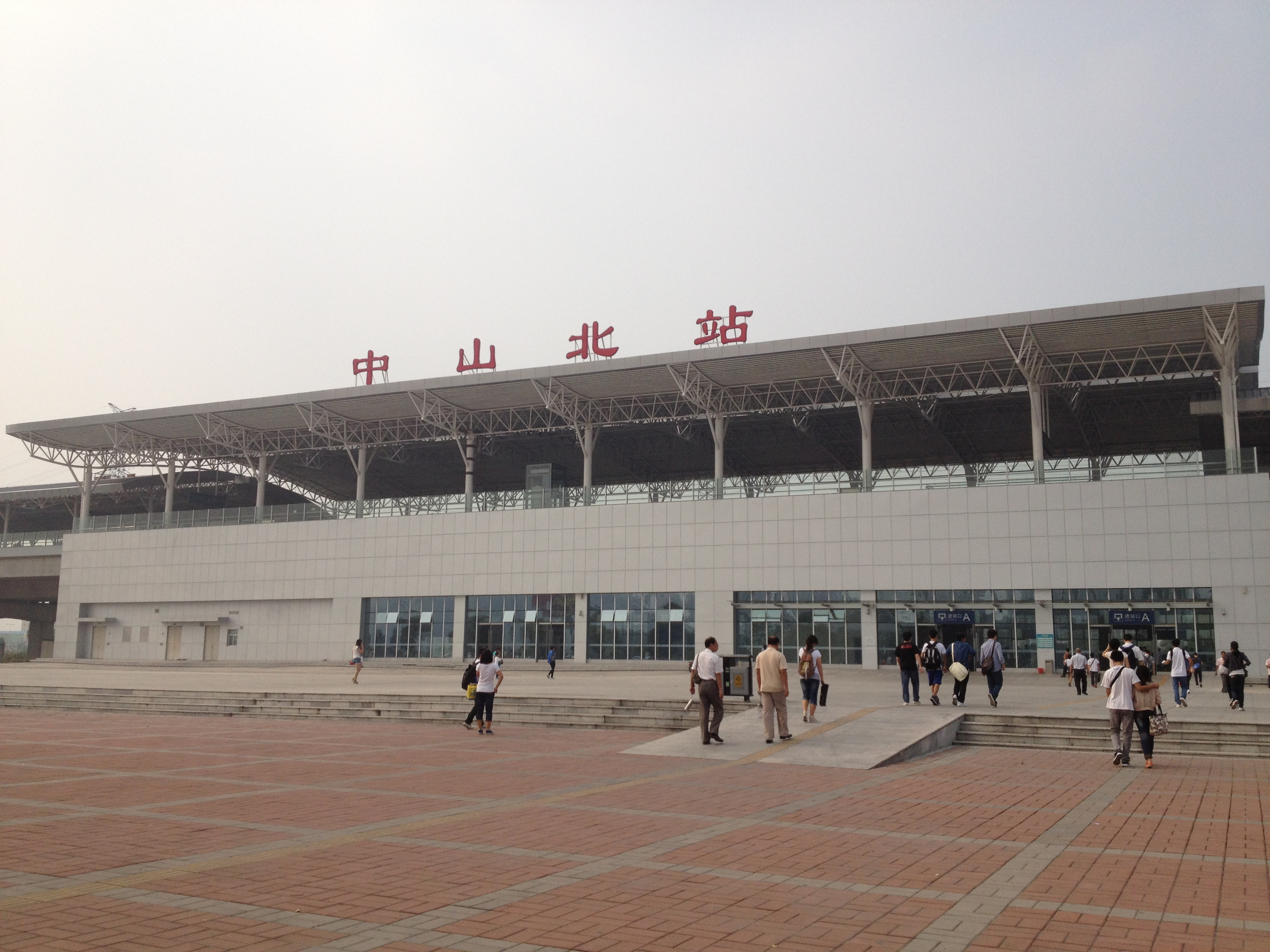
Zhongshan North railway station in 2012

The subdistrict is served by the Zhongshan North railway station, located on the Guangzhou–Zhuhai intercity railway.

The station is located on Minke West Road (Chinese: 民科西路) in Shiqi Subistrict. It is the station nearest to the city centre of Zhongshan.

=== Water ===
Shiqi Subdistrict is located just over 10 kilometres (6.2 mi) west of Zhongshan Port.

== Tourist sites ==
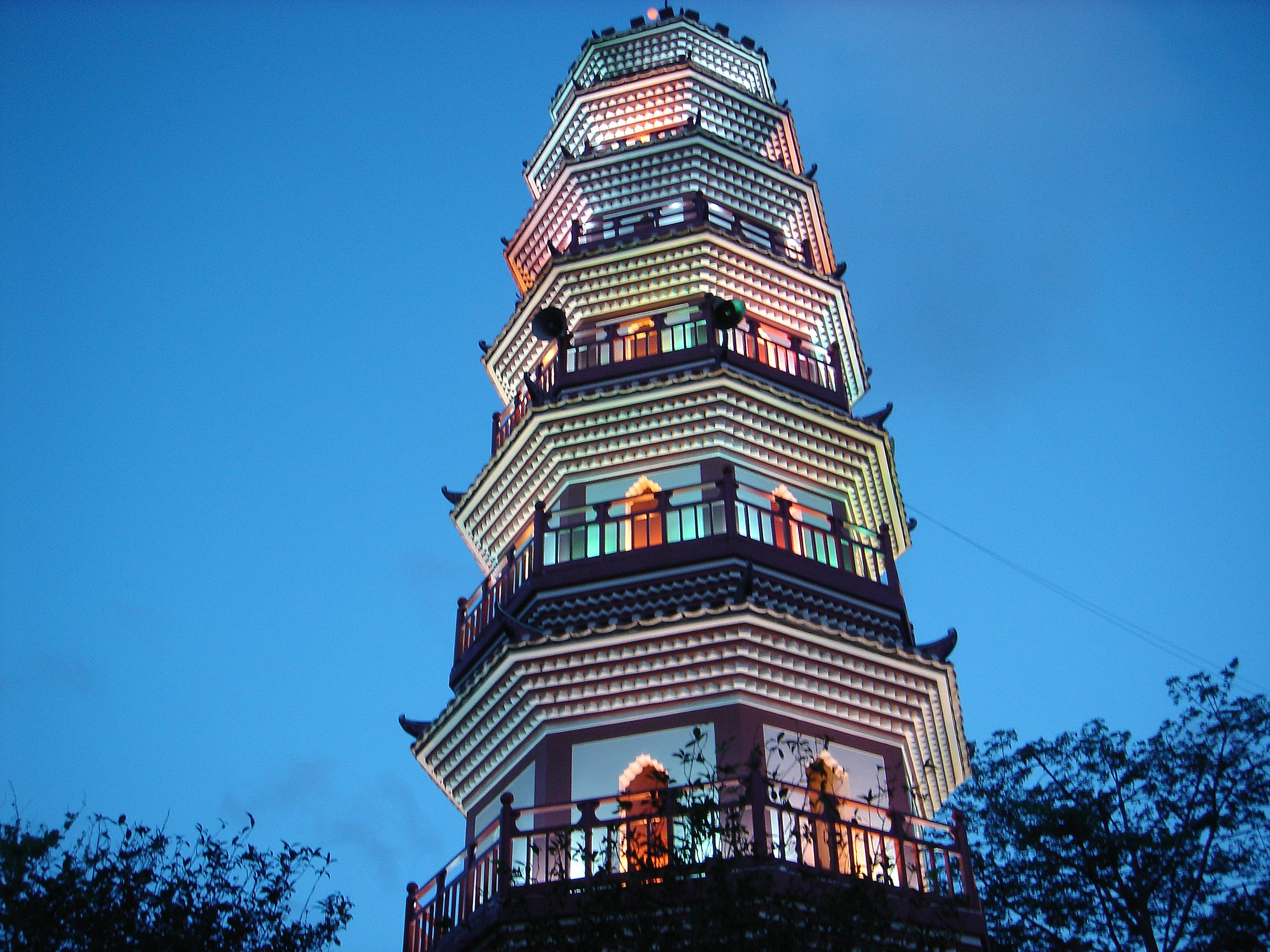
Fufeng Pagoda, one of the Ten Views of Zhongshan

- Tiecheng East Gate City Wall Ruins
- Yueshan Park (Chinese: 月山公园)
- Sanshan Ancient Temple (Chinese: 三山古庙)
- Baiyi Ancient Temple (Chinese: 白衣古寺)
- Xishan Temple

== Notable people ==
- Huang Zuo, Ming dynasty politician and scholar
- Xiao Youmei, composer
- Lü Wencheng, composer

== See also ==
Other subdistricts of Zhongshan

- Dongqu Subdistrict
- Nanqu Subdistrict
- Xiqu Subdistrict
- Torch Hi-tech Industrial Development District
- Wuguishan District

== Others ==
- Shiqi dialect
