= Lychee Bay =

Geographic area in Guangzhou, China

Coordinates: 23°7′19.13″N 113°13′46.65″E

Lychee Bay or Litchi Bay (simplified Chinese: 荔枝湾; traditional Chinese: 荔枝灣; pinyin: Lìzhī Wān; Jyutping: Lai6 zi1 waan1), a set of creeks and lakes that flow southwest to Pearl River, is a tourist attraction in Guangzhou (Canton), Guangdong. Liwan District, where Lychee Bay is located, was named after it. There are many historical relics and historical architectures in Lychee Bay, such as Wenta and Xiguan House. Various cultural activities are held on Lychee Bay, such as the Cantonese opera competition.

== Geography ==
Lychee Bay is located in Xiguan, Liwan District, Guangzhou. In the past, it usually referred to a large area from Sima Creek (駟馬涌) to Wongsha (黃沙). It is a drainage system composed of several creeks, including Xiguan and Liwan Creeks, flowing into the Pearl River. This is called the old Lychee Bay (舊荔枝灣) now. In a modern context, Lychee Bay usually refers to the segment of Xiguan Creek from Puntong (泮塘) to the Pearl River, which is part of the old Lychee Bay.

== History ==
=== Origin of Lychee Bay ===
Lychee Bay's history dates back to 2,200 years ago. In 206 BC, the Han emperor asked his subordinate Lü Jia to come to Guangzhou in order to surrender. After he did so, Lu Jia settled in Xicun, a small village in Guangzhou. He planted vegetables and flowers. Gradually, people started to call this place "Lychee Bay".

=== Rise of Lychee Bay ===
During the Tang dynasty, people started to build the famous "Liyuan" (荔園) garden. During the Nanhan dynasty, there were many gardens, such as "Fanghuayuan" (芳華苑), "Hualinyuan" (華林園), and "Changhuayuan" (昌華苑). These became imperial gardens. During the Yuan dynasty, there were also lemon gardens. At the time of the Ming dynasty, Lychee Bay became a tourist attraction for ordinary people. Besides, it became one of the eight most famous attractions in Guangzhou. Its fame increased during the Qing dynasty.

Map of Guangzhou in 1930

=== Decay of Lychee Bay ===
In the 1940s, Lychee Bay became inhabited by vegetable growers and poor people due to the rapid development and urbanization in Guangzhou city. In order to expand the city area and build more houses, the citizens cut the trees down. At the same time, Xicun became the industrial base of Guangzhou city. The river became polluted and the water quality became increasingly worse.

=== Disappearance of Lychee Bay ===
In the 1950s, there were still water channels, but every branch of these water channels was filled with earth. With the establishment of factories in Guangzhou, the water system of Lychee Bay had become a cesspool. In the 1980s, more and more water channels were filled. In 1992, the last water channel—from Punkai Restaurant (泮溪酒家) to Fungyuen Bridge (逢源橋) — was filled. Lychee Bay disappeared.

=== Reappearance of Lychee Bay ===
In 1999, the Chinese People's Political Consultative Conference raised a proposal about rebuilding Lychee Bay. In 2009, this proposal was finally put into effect because of the Asian Games. On 16 October 2010, water was imported into the river, and Lychee Bay was born anew.

== Tourist attractions ==
=== Leung Ancestral Hall ===
Leung Ancestral Hall (梁家祠) is a building situated on 34 Liangjiaci Street. It is intended to convey a style reminiscent of the Lingnan region of China.

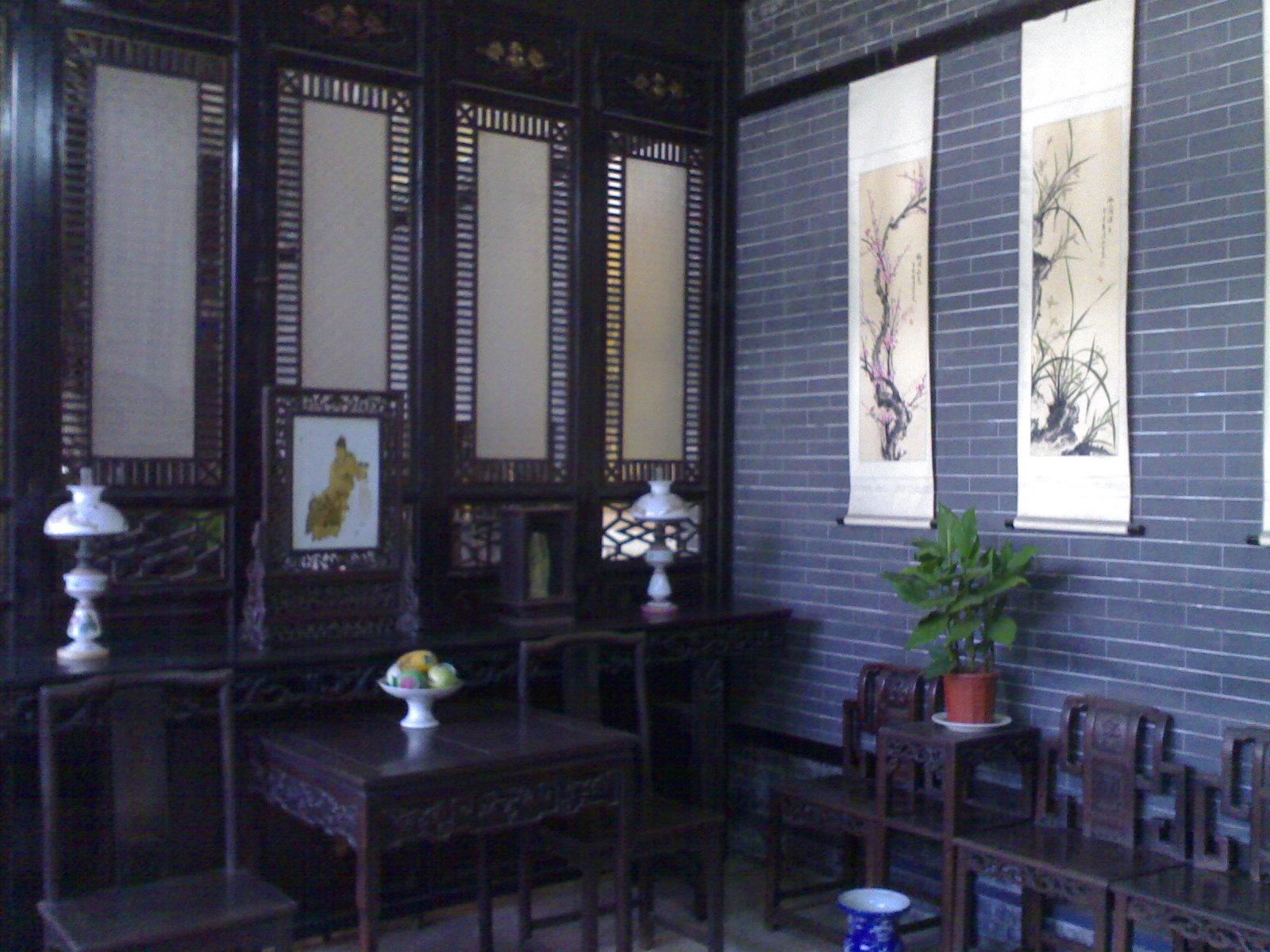
Sitting room in Xiguan House

=== Saikwan Mansion ===
Saikwan Mansion (西关大屋) represents the traditional culture of Guangzhou. This building first appeared during the Qing dynasty and was used by rich and powerful people.

=== Renwei Temple ===
Located in Longjing Road West, Guangzhou, Renwei Temple (仁威庙) is about 2,200 square meters in size. The temple is used to worship Emperor Zhenwu (真武帝) as well as by Taoists. Renwei Temple was built in 1052. It is famous for its decorations, such as wood, stone, and brick carvings.

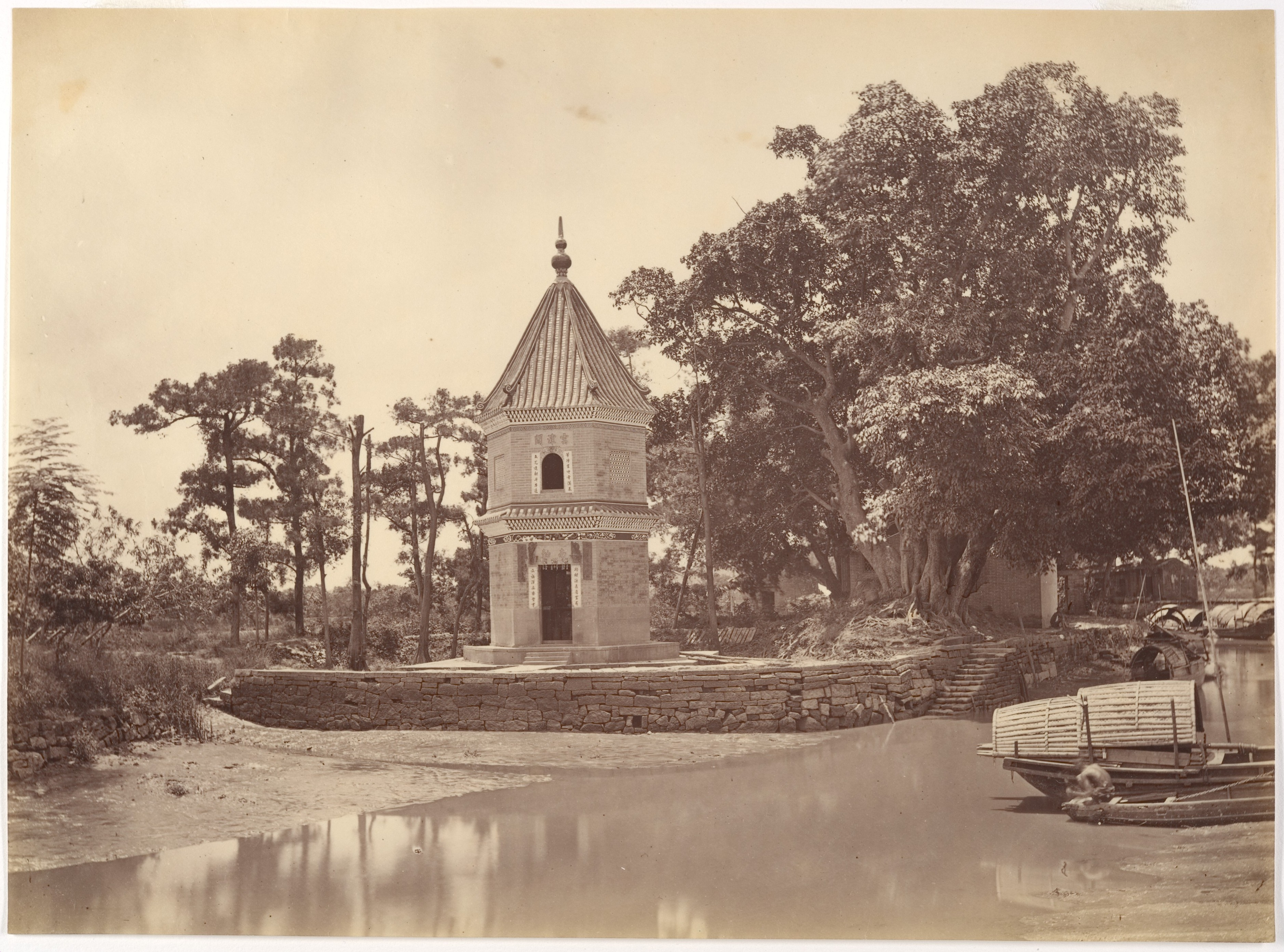
Wenta

=== Wenta ===
Wen Pagoda (文塔; man4 taap3), also called Wenbita or (文笔塔; 文筆塔; man4 bat1 taap3) Wenchangta (文昌塔; man4 coeng1 taap3), is located in Lychee Bay. It is uncertain when it was built. However, according to its architectural style, it dates from the Qing dynasty. Wenta is a 2-story brick/wood structure which stands at 13 meters high.

=== Cruise ships ===
Electric cruise ships are available for people to visit Lychee Bay.

== Food ==
Lychee Bay offers many types of traditional Guangzhou cuisine.

=== Beef offal ===
Beef offal, which comes in many flavors, is famous in Guangzhou. The dish includes radishes and Chinese herbs. In Guangzhou, it is usually salty and spicy. In Lychee Bay, many people would cup a bowl of beef offal.

=== Water chestnut cake ===
Water chestnut cake is one of the traditional desserts in Guangdong province and southern Fujian. There are many kinds of water chestnut cake, such as coconut-water chestnut cake and hawthorn-water chestnut cake.

=== Pickled radish ===
Pickle radish, which tastes sweet and sour, is a typical dish of the region.
