= Zhang Qiandong =

Chinese coal miner

- Born: October 1966 (age 59); China, Sichuan, Yingshan County
- Occupation: Former captain of Team 103 of Chongqing Yutianbao Coal Mine
- Political party: Chinese Communist Party

Zhang Qiandong (Chinese: 张前东; born October 1966) is a Chinese coal miner and former team leader of the 103rd Team at the Yutianbao Coal Mine in Chongqing, China. He is a member of the Chinese Communist Party. Zhang rose to national prominence in 2002, after leading 63 trapped miners to safety during a major flooding incident underground. For his bravery and leadership, he was named one of the inaugural recipients of the "Touching China Annual Person of the Year" award in 2002.

== Early life ==
Zhang was born in October 1966 in Yingshang County, Sichuan Province. He began working in the coal mining industry in 1988.

== Yutianbao coal mine flood ==
On June 13, 2002, heavy rainfall in the area near the Yutianbao Coal Mine, operated by the Nantung Mining Bureau in Chongqing, caused the Liujia River riverbed on the west side of the mine to collapse. Over 130 millimetres of rain fell within 10 hours, leading to a sudden influx of water into the mine. At around 8:00 a.m., Zhang was about to finish his shift when he noticed signs of flooding underground. Realizing that several unfamiliar workers were still down in the shaft, he returned to the mine to find and rescue them. At the time, the underground water inflow had reached 10,000 cubic meters per hour, which meant that the main working area would be completely submerged within hours. By 11:40 a.m., the drainage system underground was overwhelmed, and water levels began to rise rapidly. Zhang descended 800 meters into the mine to check "Zone 42" for any trapped workers. By the time he reached that section, water had already reached a depth of 1.8 meters at the 750-meter level. Finding no one, he began to retreat. By 2:0 p.m., he had reached the 500-meter level, while the 616-meter level was already fully flooded. At that point, approximately 50 miners had gathered in the main shaft. Zhang led them in an attempt to escape eastward through the tunnel. As the water rose, miners had to hold onto overhead pipes to move forward. Eventually, at 5:00 p.m., Zhang successfully led one group of workers out of the mine. On that day, out of 973 miners working underground, only three perished.

Zhang's courageous decision to re-enter the mine and his calm, decisive leadership during the crisis were widely praised. His award citation for the 2002 Touching China Annual Person of the Year read:

“At a time of disaster, he made a great choice. Though he had already escaped the shadow of death, he ran back toward it—to bring the light of life to his struggling comrades. He was fearless, clear-headed, and resolute. His personal integrity lit up the dark tunnels of the mine, brought life to hundreds of miners, and illuminated the hearts of the people.

== Later career ==
In 2003, Zhang received the May 1st Labor Medal and the “Glory Contribution Award for Revitalizing Chongqing.” In 2005, he was honored as a National Model Worker. He later served as a delegate to the 16th People's Congress of Chongqing's Wansheng District and as the general manager of the Jiuguoqing Forestry Branch under the Nantong Mining Company.
