= Jiujiang, Guangdong =

Jiujiang 九江镇
- Town
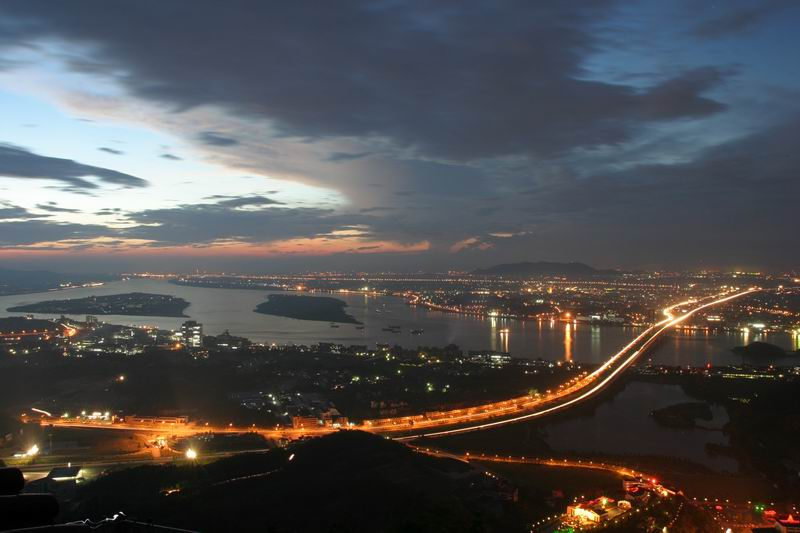
- Jiujiang viewed from across the Xi River

- Location within Guangdong
- Coordinates: 22°49′57″N 113°00′49″E
- Country: China
- Province: Guangdong
- Prefecture-level city: Foshan
- Foshan: Nanhai

Area
  - Total: 94.75 km^{2} (36.58 sq mi)
- Elevation: 6 m (20 ft)
- Time zone: UTC+8 (China Standard)
- Postal code: 440605121
- Area code: 0757

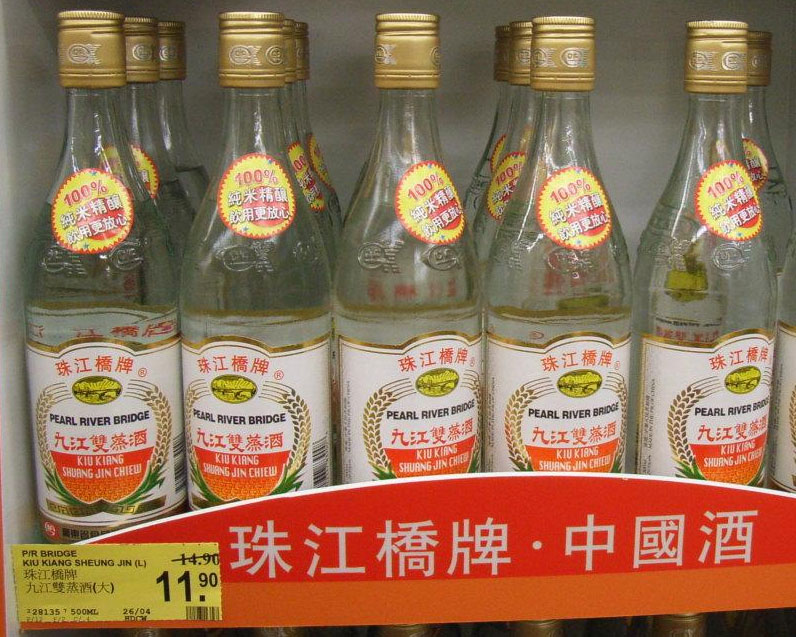
Rice wine produced in Jiujiang Town

Jiujiang Town (Chinese: 九江; pinyin: Jiǔjiāng; Jyutping: gau^{2}gong^{1}; lit. 'Nine Rivers') is a town in Nanhai District, Foshan, Guangdong, Southern China. It covers an area of 94.75 square kilometres (36.58 sq mi) with a registered population of 99,600 and a migrant population of 55,000. It is an important production base for clothing, electronics, packaging and rice wine in Foshan. It connects with Heshan by the famous Jiujiang Bridge across the Xi River.

== See also ==
- Jiujiang dialect
