= Hedong =

Hedong (simplified Chinese: 河东; traditional Chinese: 河東; lit. 'East of the River', unless otherwise noted) may refer to these places in China:

== Districts ==
- Hedong District, Sanya, in Sanya, Hainan
- Hedong District, Linyi, in Linyi, Shandong
- Hedong District, Tianjin, in Tianjin

== Subdistricts ==
- Hedong Subdistrict, Fuyang, in Yingdong District, Fuyang, Anhui
- Hedong Subdistrict, Maoming, in Maonan District, Maoming, Guangdong
- Hedong Subdistrict, Liuzhou, in Chengzhong District, Liuzhou, Guangxi
- Hedong Subdistrict, Botou, in Botou, Hebei
- Hedong Subdistrict, Hengshui, in Taocheng District, Hengshui, Hebei
- Hedong Subdistrict, Qinhuangdao, in Haigang District, Qinhuangdao, Hebei
- Hedong Subdistrict, Shijiazhuang, in Chang'an District, Shijiazhuang, Hebei
- Hedong Subdistrict, Harbin, in Acheng District, Harbin, Heilongjiang
- Hedong Subdistrict, Baotou, in Donghe District, Baotou, Inner Mongolia
- Hedong Subdistrict, Genhe, in Genhe, Inner Mongolia
- Hedong Subdistrict, Ji'an, in Qingyuan District, Ji'an, Jiangxi
- Hedong Subdistrict, Benxi, in Xihu District, Benxi, Liaoning
- Hedong Subdistrict, Fushun, in Shuncheng District, Fushun, Liaoning
- Hedong Subdistrict, Delingha, in Delingha, Qinghai

== Towns ==
- Hedong, Guazhou County, in Guazhou County, Gansu
- Hedong, Wuwei, in Wuwei, Gansu
- Hedong, Lianshan County (禾洞), in Lianshan Yao Autonomous County, Guangdong
- Hedong, Shanwei, in Lufeng, Guangdong
- Hedong, Wuhua County, in Wuhua County, Guangdong
- Hedong, Zhuolu County, in Zhuolu County, Hebei
- Hedong Town, Baotou, in Donghe District, Baotou, Inner Mongolia
- Hedong, Nanbu County, in Nanbu County, Sichuan

== Townships ==
- Hedong Township, Fujian, in Songxi County, Fujian
- Hedong Township, Heilongjiang, in Shangzhi, Heilongjiang
- Hedong Township, Dayu County (河洞乡), in Dayu County, Jiangxi
- Hedong Township, De'an County, in De'an County, Jiangxi
- Hedong Township, Qinghai, in Guide County, Qinghai
- Hedong Township, Jinchuan County, in Jinchuan County, Sichuan
- Hedong Township, Qu County, in Qu County, Sichuan
- Hedong Township, Yuexi County, in Yuexi County, Sichuan

== Chinese history ==
- Hedong Commandery, a division of imperial China
- Jin (Later Tang precursor) (907–923), an early state of the Five Dynasties period, sometimes known as Hedong

== Other uses ==
- Hedong Station (鹤洞站), a station of Guangfo Metro in Guangzhou, Guangdong
- Hedong Bridge (鹤洞大桥), a bridge over the Pearl River in Guangzhou
- Yinchuan Hedong Airport (银川河东机场), an airport in Yinchuan, Ningxia
