= Linjiang Campaign =

1946 military campaign

- Part of Chinese Civil War
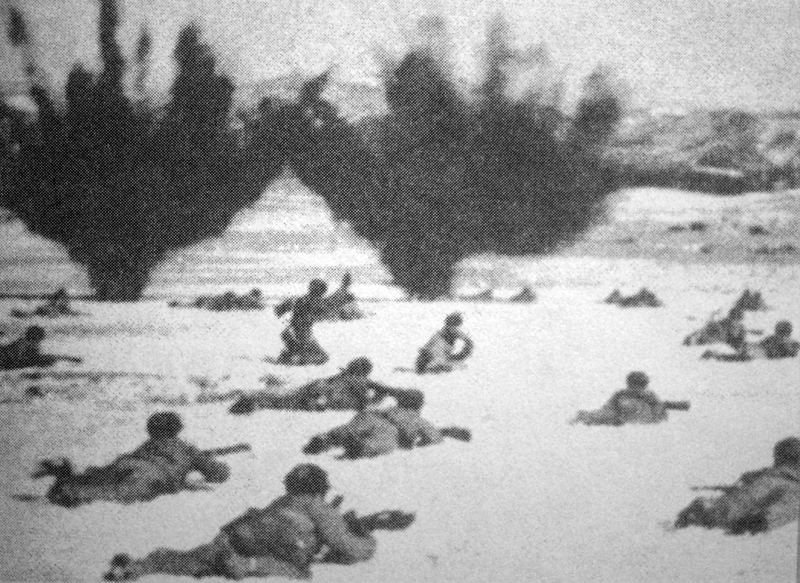
- Chinese Communist troops on top of snow-covered grounds
Date	December 17, 1946 – April 1, 1947 (3 months, 2 weeks and 1 day)
Location	Linjiang, Northeast China
Result	Communist victory

Belligerents
Flag of the National Revolutionary Army National Revolutionary Army	PLA People's Liberation Army

Commanders and leaders
(Republic of China (1912–1949)) Du Yuming	Lin Biao

Strength
19 divisions	12 divisions

Casualties and losses
40,000	Unknown

Linjiang Campaign (Chinese: 临江战役), also known by the communists as the Campaign of Going South of the River for Three time to Guard Linjiang for Four Times (San Xia Jiang Nan, Si Bao Linjiang Zhanyi, 三下江南四保临江战役), was a series of four failed offensives launched by the nationalists in an attempt to eliminate the communist base south of the Songhua River during the Chinese Civil War.

== Prelude ==
The nationalists had lost three divisions to the enemy by October, 1946 in northeast China, and the local nationalist commander, Du Yuming adjusted the strategy by planning to eradicate the enemy in a gradual but firm manner, instead of attempting to eliminate the enemy rapidly by a decisive engagement, which the enemy had refused to do. The heart of this new strategy called for the elimination of the enemy base south of the Songhua River, headquartered at Linjiang. After the enemy had been eradicated in the south, the nationalists would then advance northward across the Songhua River and eliminate the enemy forces there.

In response to the nationalist strategy, the communist commander of northeast China, Lin Biao, and his followers accurately concluded that the communist base south of the Songhua River must be maintained at all costs, because it served to distract the enemy and if it were lost, the enemy could then devote its entire assets to pressure the communists north of the Songhua River, and the communists in northeast China would then be endangered, and possibly face total annihilation. The communists decided to concentrate three columns with a total of nine divisions to stop the nationalist offensives, along with the help of three independent divisions.

== Order of battle ==
Nationalist order of battle

- The Newly Organized 1st Army
  - The Newly Organized 22nd Division
  - The Newly Organized 30th Division
- The Newly Organized 6th Army
- The 52nd Army
  - The 2nd Division
  - The 195th Division
- The 60th Army
- The 91st Division of the 71st Army
- The 21st Division
- The 87th Division
- The 88th Division
- The 89th Division
- The 207th Division
- The 54th Division of the 13th Army

Communist order of battle

- The 3rd Column
- The 4th Column
- The 6th Column
- The 1st Independent Division
- The 2nd Independent Division
- The 3rd Independent Division

== First stage ==
On December 17, 1946, the nationalists sent out six divisions, including the 2nd division, the 195th Division of the 52nd Army, the 91st Division of the 71st Army, one Division from each of the Newly Organized 1st Army, the Newly Organized 6th Army, and the 60th Army to launch the first offensive against the communist base south of Songhua River, and two more Divisions were deployed as reserves. The initial nationalist objective was to linkup Tonghua with Ji'an (集安) so that the enemy could be further squeezed into the mountain. In response, on December 18, 1946, the communist 4th Column struck the regions between Fushun, Huanren and Benxi behind the enemy lines, and after more than a dozen days of fighting, succeeded in taking over more than twenty positions from the nationalists, including the critical ones at Alkaline Factory (Jian Chang, 碱厂) and Master Field (Tian Shifu, 田师付), and killing more than 3,000 nationalist troops in the process. The nationalist 91st Division of the 71st Army was forced to withdraw to reinforce the rear, and this weakened the nationalist thrust by exposing the two divisions of the nationalist 52nd Army, which were ultimately badly mauled by the enemy who seized the opportunity and attacked with great efficiency and speed, resulting in the regions south of Tonghua newly taken by the nationalists earlier in the initial stage of the offensive falling back into the enemy hands.

In the north, the communists massed three columns and three independent divisions to cross the Songhua River and on January 5, 1947, to besiege the nationalist strategic location of Pagoda Wood (Tamu, 塔木), forced the nationalist offensive into a complete halt and then redeploying two attacking divisions to reinforce Pagoda Wood (Tamu, 塔木). However, when the nationalist reinforcements reached the region between Zhangmazi Ditch (Zhangmazi Gou, 张麻子沟) and the Jiao Family's Ridge (Jiajia Ling, 焦家岭), they learned that Pagoda Wood (Tamu, 塔木) had already fallen into enemy hands, with the entire garrison consisting of a security force regiment and two regiments of the Newly Organized 1st Army being completely annihilated by the enemy. The enemy consequently returned to north of the Songhua River on January 19, 1947.

Achieving their objectives when the nationalists stopped their assault on Linjiang, the communists withdrew to their original bases and the nationalists could not pursuit the enemy anymore due to the sudden change of the weather when the temperature suddenly dropped to forty degrees below zero.

== Second stage ==
The nationalists correctly assessed that they must avoid fighting at the two fronts and thus attacks on the communist base in the south must continue in order to eliminate the enemy. On January 30, 1947, a second offensive was launched with four divisions: the 21st Division, the 2nd Division, the 195th Division of the 52nd Army, and the 207th Division. The communists in turn, deployed the 3rd Column and the 10th Division of the 4th Column to stop the nationalist offensive and on February 5, 1947, the weakest nationalist division, the 195th Division of the 52nd Army was ambushed at Gaolichengzi (高力城子), and suffered more than 2,000 fatalities. On February 6, 1947, a regiment of the advance guard of the nationalist 207th Division was annihilated at Sanyuanpu (三源浦) by dusk, and after the setback, the commander of the nationalist 207th Division wisely chose to stop and withdraw.

Meanwhile, the communist 4th Column once again struck the regions between Fushun (抚顺), Huanren (桓仁) and Benxi (本溪) deep behind the nationalist lines to capture numerous nationalist strongholds, and when combined with communist victories elsewhere, eventually succeeded in forcing the second nationalist offensive to a complete stop again, and the nationalists were forced to give up the newly conquered lands when one division was redeployed to reinforce the rear and other begun their withdraw.

== Third Stage ==
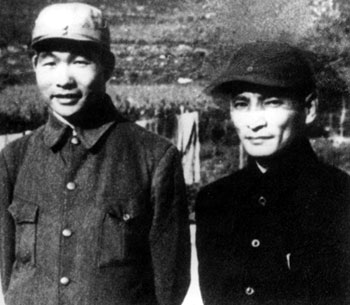
In 1947, Xiao Jinguang and Chen Yun were in Linjiang.

Just a week after the failure of the second offensive, the nationalists launched their third offensive against the enemy by deploying the 2nd Division, the 195th Division of the 52nd Army, the 91st Division of the 71st Army, the Newly Organized 22nd Division of the Newly Organized 1st Army and the 21st Division to attack in four fronts on February 13, 1947. A detachment of the communist 4th Column again played the same trick that was effective in the previous two counteroffensives: struck the regions between Fushun, Huanren and Benxi deep behind the nationalist line again and attracting three nationalist divisions so that they could not be used to attack the communist base south of Songhua River, while in the meantime, the communist 3rd Column and the 4th Column first annihilated an entire regiment of the nationalist 21st Division at Tonggou (通沟), and then annihilated another regiment of the nationalist 91st Division of the 71st Army at Daibeicha (大北岔), forcing the two nationalist Divisions to withdraw on February 22, 1947. The newly gained territory/towns in the nationalist third offensive such as Huinan (辉南), Golden River (Jinchuan, 金川), Willow River (Liuhe, 柳河) and Ji'an (集安) therefore fell back into the enemy hands.

On the other front, the communist force crossed the Songhua River on February 21, 1947, and attacked regions surrounding Changchun to distract the nationalists. After annihilating an entire regiment of the Newly Organized 30th Division of the Newly Organized 1st Army at the town of Chengzi Street (Chengzi Jie, 城子街), the communist 6th Column turned north and linked up with the communist 2nd Independent Division to besiege Dehui (德惠) in order to draw nationalist forces away from the communist base. The plan succeeded and the nationalists redeployed the Newly Organized 1st Army (including its Newly Organized 22nd Division), the 87th Division, and the 88th Division to reinforce their besieged comrades-in-arms. The enemy force wisely chose to withdraw back to the north of Songhua River on March 2, 1947, before the nationalist reinforcement could reach Dehui.

The nationalists were determined not to let the enemy to get away so they continued their push northward, but in doing so, the nationalist forces were severely overstretched. Seizing the opportunity, the enemy crossed the Songhua River again on March 8, 1947, for the third time to attack, and the nationalist commanders had no choice but to order a general retreat. However, the retreating nationalist force was caught up by the pursuing enemy and the nationalist 88th Division was annihilated at the Village of the Mountain of Guo (Guo-shan Tun, 郭山屯), and the nationalist 87th Division was badly mauled at the Village Next to the Mountain (Kao-shan Tun, 靠山屯). On March 12, 1947, Nong'an (农安) was besieged and the nationalists were forced to redeploy the Newly Organized 1st Army (including its Newly Organized 22nd Division) and the 54th Division of the 13th Army from Rehe (热河) to reinforce their besieged comrades-in-arms again. Succeeding in distracting the nationalists who had to stop their third offensives, the enemy withdrew to the north of Songhua River.

== Fourth Stage ==
Not wanting to admitting defeat, the nationalists launched their fourth offensive against the communist base south of Songhua River on March 26, 1947, with a total strength of twenty regiments attacking in three fronts. The enemy, in response, targeted the central front headed by the nationalist 89th Division, who was dangerously exposed because its push was much too fast. While other enemy units resisted the nationalist left and right fronts, the main body of the enemy force ambushed the 89th Division of the nationalist central front on April 1, 1947, annihilating the entire Division. Hearing the news of the annihilation of the nationalist 89th Division, the nationalists on the other two fronts immediately withdrew.

The failure of the nationalist fourth offensive marked the end of campaign because the units deployed were the same ones that participated in earlier offensives, and thus were gravely overworked and overstretched. The nationalists could not afford to expend anymore valuable troops and must reserve their strength to defend the territory currently under their control.

== Outcome ==
The Linjiang Campaign marked the turning point of the battlefield in northeast China: after this communist victory, the nationalists in northeast China were forced to be on the defensive, and could no longer launch any offensives, while in contrast, the communists would be on the offensive from then on. It must be said, however, the nationalists were still quite capable of knocking out the entire communist force in northeast China if the right tactics were applied, such as concentrating on annihilating the enemy force instead of gaining and holding on to more land, as suggested by many local nationalist commanders, but their correct suggestion was overridden by Chiang Kai-shek infatuation with conquering more land. Furthermore, even if the nationalists were unable to annihilate the enemy at the time, they could still reserve their strength by giving up northeast China and saving troops, and had the situation improved, the nationalists would be able to retake northeast China, as suggested by Chen Cheng in 1946. Again, this alternative would also contradicting with Chiang's uncompromising stand, which ultimately doomed the nationalists.

== See also ==
- Outline of the Chinese Civil War
- National Revolutionary Army
- History of the People's Liberation Army
