= Pei Rongfu =

Chinese engineer (1924–2025)

- 裴荣富
- Born: 24 August 1924; Linyu County, Zhili, China
- Died: 25 January 2025 (aged 100); Beijing, China
- Education: Beijing Normal University; Tsinghua University
- Scientific career
- Fields: Geology of Mineral Deposits; Mineral Exploration Science
- Workplaces: Chinese Academy of Geological Sciences

Chinese name
- Simplified Chinese: 裴荣富
- Traditional Chinese: 裴榮富
Transcriptions
Standard Mandarin
- Hanyu Pinyin: Péi Róngfù

Pei Rongfu (Chinese: 裴荣富; 24 August 1924 – 25 January 2025) was a Chinese engineer in the fields of geology of mineral deposits and mineral exploration science, and an academician of the Chinese Academy of Engineering.

== Life and career ==
Pei was born in Linyu County, Zhili (now Qinhuangdao, Hebei), on 24 August 1924, while his ancestral home is in Liaocheng, Shandong. In 1943, he was accepted to the Department of Geosciences, Beijing Normal University, but transferred to the Department of Geosciences, Tsinghua University in January 1945.

After university in 1948, Pei worked in Beiping Geological Survey Institute. In May 1952, he moved to the Central South Geological Bureau of the Ministry of Geology and then to the Mineral Raw Materials Research Institute of the Chinese Academy of Geological Sciences in October 1957. He was recalled to the Ministry of Geology in January 1973, when he was appointed chief engineer of the Geological Support Team from the Ministry of Geology to Sudan. He joined the Chinese Communist Party (CCP) in 1976. He returned to the Chinese Academy of Geological Sciences in January 1978.

Pei died in Beijing on 25 January 2025, at the age of 100.

== Honours and awards ==
- 1988 State Science and Technology Progress Award (Second Class) for non-ferrous and rare metal deposits such as lead-zinc deposits in the Nanling Mountain area
- 1995 Li Siguang Geological Science Award
- 1999 Member of the Chinese Academy of Engineering (CAE)
- 2007 State Science and Technology Progress Award (Second Class) for China's metallogenic system and regional metallogenic evaluation
