= Xigang =

Xigang may refer to the following locations:

== Mainland China ==
- Xigang District, Dalian (西岗区), Liaoning
- Xigang Road Subdistrict (西港路街道), Haigang District, Qinhuangdao, Hebei
- Xigang, Hebei (西港镇), town in Haigang District, Qinhuangdao, Hebei
- Xigang, Jiangxi (西港镇), town in Xiushui County, Jiangxi
- Xigang, Shandong (西岗镇), town in Tengzhou, Shandong
- Xigang Township (西岗乡), Fusong County, Jilin

== Taiwan ==
- Sigang District (西港區), alternately Xigang, district in Tainan
