= Hexi =

Hexi (Chinese: 河西; pinyin: héxī; lit. 'west of river') may refer to:

== Geographic region ==
- Hexi Corridor, corridor in Gansu

== Districts ==
- Hexi District, Tianjin
- Hexi District, Sanya, township-level district of Sanya, Hainan

== Subdistricts ==
- Hexi Subdistrict, Huazhou, Guangdong, in Huazhou City, Guangdong
- Hexi Subdistrict, Lufeng, Guangdong, in Lufeng City, Guangdong
- Hexi Subdistrict, Maoming, in Maonan District, Maoming, Guangdong
- Hexi Subdistrict, Laibin, in Xingbin District, Laibin, Guangxi
- Hexi Subdistrict, Liuzhou, in Liunan District, Liuzhou, Guangxi
- Hexi Subdistrict, Tongren, in Bijiang District, Tongren, Guizhou
- Hexi Subdistrict, Hengshui, in Taocheng District, Hengshui, Hebei
- Hexi Subdistrict, Genhe, in Genhe City, Inner Mongolia
- Hexi Subdistrict, Zhalantun, in Zhalantun City, Inner Mongolia
- Hexi Subdistrict, Tongliao, in Horqin District, Tongliao, Inner Mongolia
- Hexi Subdistrict, Delingha, in Delingha, Qinghai
- Hexi Subdistrict, Golmud, in Golmud City, Qinghai
- Hexi Subdistrict, Qingdao, in Sifang District, Qingdao, Shandong
- Hexi Subdistrict, Guangyuan, in Lizhou District, Guangyuan, Sichuan
- Hexi Subdistrict, Tianjin, in Binhai New Area, Tianjin
- Hexi New Town, in Nanjing, Jiangsu

== Towns ==
- Hexi, Jingning She Autonomous County (鹤溪镇), in Jingning She Autonomous County, Zhejiang

Written as "河西镇":

- Hexi, Linxi County, Hebei
- Hexi, Fuxin, in Qinghemen District, Fuxin, Liaoning
- Hexi, Ankang, in Hanbin District, Ankang, Shaanxi
- Hexi, Gaoping, in Gaoping City, Shanxi
- Hexi, Tonghai County, in Tonghai County, Yunnan
- Hexi, Guide County, in Guide County, Qinghai
