= Mingshan =

Mingshan may refer to the following locations in China:

- Mingshan District, Ya'an (名山区), formerly Mingshan County, Sichuan
- Mingshan District, Benxi (明山区), Liaoning
- Mingshan, Luobei County (名山镇), town in Heilongjiang
- Mingshan Subdistrict (名山街道)
  - Mingshan Subdistrict, Fengdu County, Chongqing
  - Mingshan Subdistrict, Yulin, Guangxi, Yuzhou Mingshan District, Yulin, Guangxi
  - Mingshan Subdistrict, Benxi, in Mingshan District, Liaoning
