= 河東 =

河東 (Traditional Chinese, Japanese, and Korean Hanja), or 河东 (Simplified Chinese) may refer to:

== China ==
- Hedong (disambiguation)

== Japan ==
- Katō District, Hokkaidō, in Tokachi Subprefecture

== South Korea ==
- Hadong, county of South Gyeongsang Province
