= Mingshan District =

Mingshan District may refer to:

- Mingshan District, Benxi (明山区), Liaoning, China
- Mingshan District, Ya'an (名山区), Sichuan, China
