= Qinhuangdao Haigang Mosque =

Mosque in Hebei, China

Qinhuangdao Haigang Mosque (Chinese: 海港清真寺; pinyin: hǎi gǎng qīng zhēn sì) is a mosque located in Qingzhen Street, Haigang District, Qinhuangdao, Hebei Province, China.

== See also ==
- Islam in China
- List of mosques in China
