= Gucheng, Huanren County =

Gucheng 古城 ᡤᡠ ᠴᡝᠩ
- Town
- Location within Liaoning province.
- Coordinates: 41°28′44″N 125°28′01″E
- Country: China
- Province: Liaoning
- Prefecture-level city: Benxi
- County: Huanren County

Area
  - Total: 314 km^{2} (121 sq mi)
- Elevation: 345 m (1,132 ft)

Population
  - Total: 25,700
  - Density: 81.8/km^{2} (212/sq mi)
- Time zone: UTC+8 (China Standard)
- Postal code: 117200
- Area code: 0414

Gucheng (Chinese: 古城镇; pinyin: Gǔchéng Zhèn) Manchu: ᡤᡠ ᠴᡝᠩ
ᡴᠠᡩᠠᠯᠠᠩᡤᠠ; Möllendorff romanization: gu ceng kadalaŋga) is a town of northern Huanren Manchu Autonomous County, eastern Liaoning province in Northeast China. It lies near the border with Jilin province, in a mountainous region of the province. Huanren County is located 25 kilometres (16 mi) to the south, and the city of Tonghua in Jilin is 48 kilometres (30 mi) to the northeast. China National Highway 201 (G201) passes through the area.
