= Qiqiao =

Qiqiao may refer to:

- Qixi Festival, also known as Qiqiao Festival
- Qiqiao, Hebei (齐桥), a town in Botou, Hebei, China
- Qiqiao Subdistrict (漆桥街道), a subdistrict of Gaochun District, Nanjing, Jiangsu, China
