= Xiangyang Township, Liaoning =

Xiangyang Township 向阳乡 ᠰᡳᠠᠩ ᠶᠠᠩ ᡤᠠᡧᠠᠨ
- Township
- Location in Liaoning
- Coordinates: 41°6′14″N 125°22′28″E
- Country: People's Republic of China
- Province: Liaoning
- Prefecture-level city: Benxi
- Autonomous county: Huanren Manchu Autonomous County
- Time zone: UTC+8 (China Standard)

Xiangyang Township (simplified Chinese: 向阳乡; traditional Chinese: 向陽鄉; pinyin: Xiàngyáng Xiāng), (Manchu: ᠰᡳᠠᠩ
ᠶᠠᠩ
ᡤᠠᡧᠠᠨ; Möllendorff romanization: siang yang gašan) is a township under the administration of Huanren Manchu Autonomous County, Liaoning, China. As of 2018, it has 6 villages under its administration.
