= Xihe =

Xihe is the atonal pinyin romanization of the Mandarin pronunciation of various Chinese names.

It may refer to:

== Mythology ==
- Xihe (deity) (Chinese: 羲和), a Chinese solar deity

== Science ==
- Chinese H-alpha Solar Explorer, or Xihe, a solar observatory

== Places ==
- Xihe Commentary (西河郡), a former commentary of imperial China around Fenyang, Shanxi
- Xihe District (细河区), a district in Fuxin, Liaoning, China
- Xihe County (西和县), a county in Gansu, China
- HD 173416 (star), Constellation Lyra; a G8-type giant star; named after the Chinese solar deity

=== Towns ===
- Xihe, Chongqing (西河), in Tongliang County, Chongqing, China
- Xihe, Yongjing County (西河), in Yongjing County, Gansu, China
- Xihe, Dabu County (西河), in Dabu County, Guangdong, China
- Xihe, Shaoguan (西河), in Wujiang District, Shaoguan, Guangdong, China
- Xihe, Guangxi (西河), in Mengshan County, Guangxi, China
- Xihe, Heilongjiang (西河), in Keshan County, Heilongjiang, China
- Xihe, Suizhou (淅河镇), in Zengdu District, Suizhou, Hubei, China
- Xihe, Xiaogan (西河), in Xiaonan District, Xiaogan, Hubei, China
- Xihe, Hunan (西河), in Xinhua County, Hunan, China
- Xihe, Jiangsu (溪河), in Huai'an District, Huai'an, Jiangsu, China
- Xihe, Jilin (溪河), in Shulan, Jilin, China
- Xihe, Shaanxi (西河), in Pingli County, Shaanxi, China
- Xihe, Shandong (西河), in Zichuan District, Zibo, Shandong, China
- Xihe, Chengdu (西河), in Longquanyi District, Chengdu, Sichuan, China

=== Townships ===
- Xihe Township, Guizhou (西河乡), in Meitan County, Guizhou, China
- Xihe Township, Fenyang (西河乡), in Fenyang, Shanxi, China
- Xihe Township, Yangcheng County (西河乡), in Yangcheng County, Shanxi, China
- Xihe Township, Nanbu County (西河乡), in Nanbu County, Sichuan, China
- Xihe Township, Xide County (西河乡), in Xide County, Sichuan, China

== See also ==
- Xi (disambiguation)
- He (disambiguation)
- Hexi (disambiguation)
