= Hedong Subdistrict, Baotou =

Hedong Subdistrict 河东街道
- Subdistrict
- Location in Inner Mongolia
- Coordinates: 40°34′15″N 110°03′14″E
- Country: People's Republic of China
- Region: Inner Mongolia
- Prefecture-level city: Baotou
- District: Donghe
- Village-level divisions: 6 residential communities
- Elevation: 1,021 m (3,350 ft)
- Time zone: UTC+8 (China Standard)
- Area code: 0472

Hedong Subdistrict (simplified Chinese: 河东街道; traditional Chinese: 河東街道; pinyin: Hédōng Jiēdào; lit. 'river east') is a subdistrict of Donghe District, in the southeastern outskirts of Baotou, Inner Mongolia, People's Republic of China. As of 2018, it has six residential communities (社区) under its administration.

== See also ==
- List of township-level divisions of Inner Mongolia
