= Huanren Town =

Huanren 桓仁 ᡥᡠᠸᠠᠨᡵᡝᠨ
- Town
- Location in Liaoning
- Coordinates: 41°16′02″N 125°21′40″E
- Country: People's Republic of China
- Province: Liaoning
- Prefecture-level city: Benxi
- County: Huanren

Area
  - Total: 339 km^{2} (131 sq mi)
- Elevation: 254 m (833 ft)

Population
  - Total: 39,052
  - Density: 115/km^{2} (298/sq mi)
- Time zone: UTC+8 (China Standard)

Huanren (Chinese: 桓仁镇; pinyin: Huánrén Zhèn), Manchu: ᡥᡠᠸᠠᠨᡵᡝᠨ
ᡴᠠᡩᠠᠯᠠᠩᡤᠠ; Möllendorff romanization: huwanren kadalaŋga) is a town in and the seat of Huanren Manchu Autonomous County, in the eastern Liaoning province, China, It is located about 80 km (50 mi) to the southwest of Tonghua.

It has an area of 339 km^{2} (131 sq mi) and a population of nearly 40,000.
