= Garang Township, Qinghai =

Garji Township 尕让乡 · དཀར་བརྗིད་ཞང་། Garing, Garang
- Township
- Garangxiang
- Location in Qinghai
- Coordinates: 36°13′34″N 101°33′51″E
- Country: China
- Province: Qinghai
- Autonomous prefecture: Hainan
- County: Guide

Area
  - Total: 616.1 km^{2} (237.9 sq mi)

Population (2010)
  - Total: 12,789
  - Density: 20.76/km^{2} (53.76/sq mi)
- Time zone: UTC+8 (China Standard)
- Local dialing code: 974

Garji Township (Tibetan: དཀར་བརྗིད་ཞང་།), Garang Township (ཀ་རིང་ཞང་།) or Garang Township (Chinese: 尕让乡) is a township in Guide County, Hainan Tibetan Autonomous Prefecture, Qinghai, China. In 2010, Garji Township had a total population of 12,789 people: 6,687 males and 6,102 females: 2,870 under 14 years old, 9,172 aged between 15 and 64 and 747 over 65 years old.
