= Hedong Town, Baotou =

Hedong 河东镇
- Town
- Location in Inner Mongolia
- Coordinates: 40°34′20″N 110°04′29″E
- Country: People's Republic of China
- Region: Inner Mongolia
- Prefecture-level city: Baotou
- District: Donghe
- Village-level divisions: 2 residential communities, 26 villages
- Elevation: 1,020 m (3,350 ft)
- Time zone: UTC+8 (China Standard)
- Area code: 0472

Hedong (simplified Chinese: 河东; traditional Chinese: 河東; pinyin: Hédōng; lit. 'river east') is a town of Donghe District, in the southeastern outskirts of Baotou, Inner Mongolia, People's Republic of China, As of 2018, it has two residential communities and 26 villages under its administration.

== See also ==
- List of township-level divisions of Inner Mongolia
