= Duzhuang =

Duzhuang 杜庄镇
- Town
- Dùzhuāng Zhèn
- Location in Hebei Location in China
- Coordinates: 40°00′44″N 119°31′34″E
- Country: People's Republic of China
- Province: Hebei
- Prefecture-level city: Qinhuangdao
- District: Haigang

Area
  - Total: 89.11 km^{2} (34.41 sq mi)

Population (2010)
  - Total: 28,831
  - Density: 323.5/km^{2} (838/sq mi)
- Time zone: UTC+8 (China Standard)

Duzhuang (Chinese: 杜庄镇; pinyin: Dùzhuāng Zhèn) is a town located in Haigang District, Qinhuangdao, Hebei, China. According to the 2010 census, Duzhuang had a population of 28,831, including 15,032 males and 13,799 females. The population was distributed as follows: 4,865 people aged under 14, 22,140 people aged between 15 and 64, and 1,826 people aged over 65.

== See also ==
- List of township-level divisions of Hebei
