= Gangcheng Avenue Subdistrict =

Gangcheng Avenue Subdistrict 港城大街街道
- Urban Subdistrict
- Gǎngchéng Dàjiē Jiēdào
- Location in Hebei Location in China
- Coordinates: 39°56′42″N 119°35′43″E
- Country: People's Republic of China
- Province: Hebei
- Prefecture-level city: Qinhuangdao
- District: Haigang

Area
  - Total: 3.022 km^{2} (1.167 sq mi)

Population (2010)
  - Total: 52,932
- Time zone: UTC+8 (China Standard)

Gangcheng Avenue Subdistrict (Chinese: 港城大街街道; pinyin: Gǎngchéng Dàjiē Jiēdào) is an urban subdistrict located in Haigang District, Qinhuangdao, Hebei, China. According to the 2010 census, Gangcheng Avenue Subdistrict had a population of 52,932, including 25,612 males and 27,320 females. The population was distributed as follows: 7,257 people aged under 14, 40,158 people aged between 15 and 64, and 5,517 people aged over 65.

== See also ==
- List of township-level divisions of Hebei
