= Laxiwa, Qinghai =

Lasêwa 拉西瓦镇 · ལ་ཟེ་བ་གྲོང་རྡལ། Laxiwa
- Town
- Location in Qinghai
- Coordinates: 36°7′2″N 101°12′1″E
- Country: China
- Province: Qinghai
- Autonomous prefecture: Hainan
- County: Guide

Area
  - Total: 780.6 km^{2} (301.4 sq mi)

Population (2010)
  - Total: 7,591
  - Density: 9.725/km^{2} (25.19/sq mi)
- Time zone: UTC+8 (China Standard)
- Local dialing code: 974

Lasêwa or Laxiwa (Tibetan: ལ་ཟེ་བ་གྲོང་རྡལ།, Chinese: 拉西瓦镇) is a town in Guide County, Hainan Tibetan Autonomous Prefecture, Qinghai, China. In 2010, Lasêwa had a total population of 7,591: 4,261 males and 3,330 females: 1,485 aged under 14, 5,747 aged between 15 and 65 and 359 aged over 65.
