= Hedong Subdistrict, Benxi =

Hedong Subdistrict 河东街道
- Subdistrict
- Location in Liaoning
- Coordinates: 41°19′36″N 123°45′48″E
- Country: People's Republic of China
- Province: Liaoning
- Prefecture-level city: Benxi
- District: Xihu
- Village-level divisions: 9 residential communities
- Elevation: 124 m (407 ft)
- Time zone: UTC+8 (China Standard)
- Area code: 0414

Hedong Subdistrict (simplified Chinese: 河东街道; traditional Chinese: 河東街道; pinyin: Hédōng Jiēdào; lit. 'river east') is a subdistrict and the seat of Xihu District, Benxi, Liaoning, People's Republic of China. As of 2018, it has nine residential communities (社区) under its administration.

== See also ==
- List of township-level divisions of Liaoning
