= Guanmenshan (Benxi) =

Coordinates: 41.1172783°N 124.1201965°E

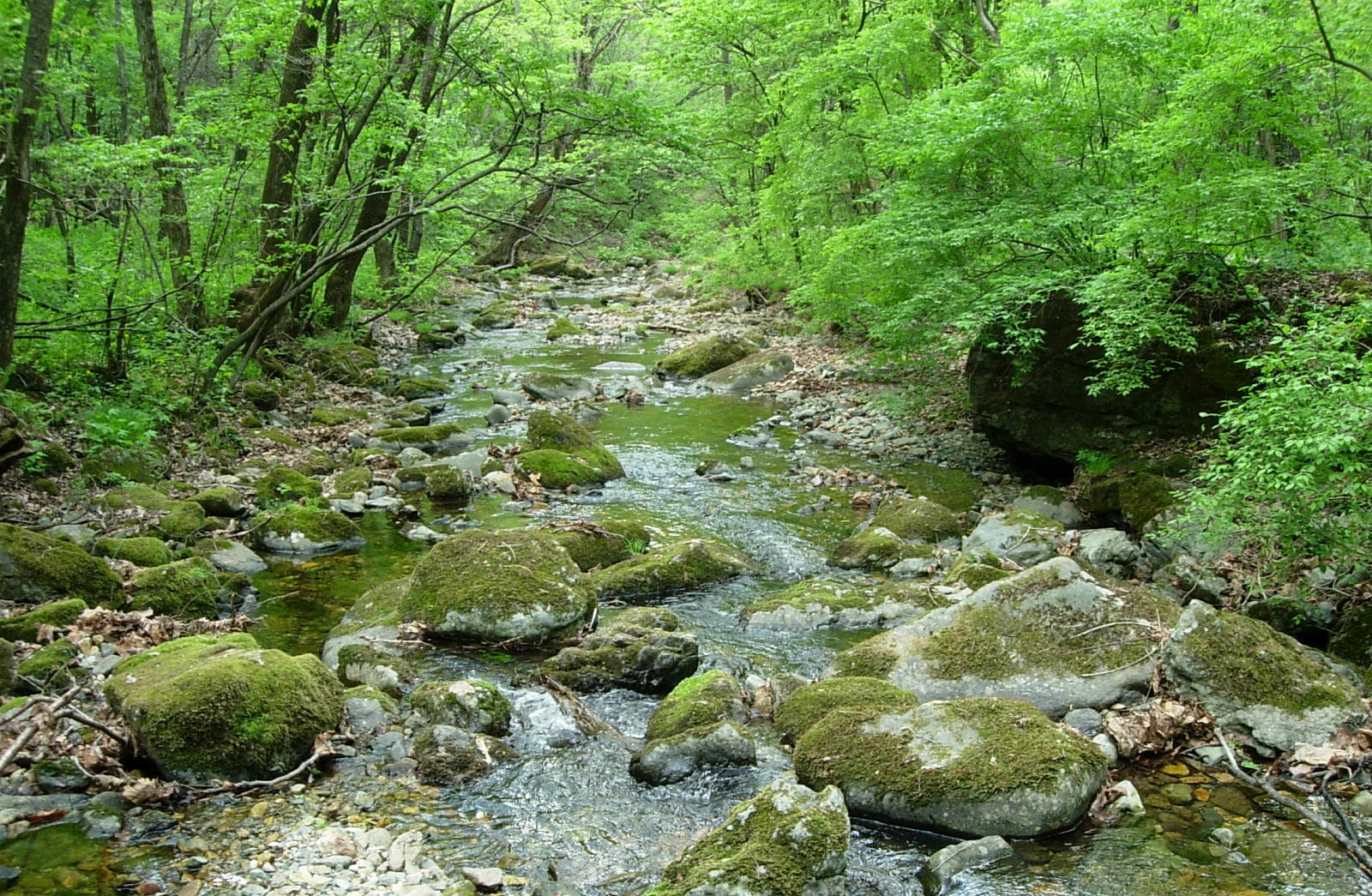
A little creek in Guanmenshan

Guanmenshan (Chinese: 关门山, meaning "Closed Gate Mountain") is located in Benxi Manchu Autonomous County, 70 kilometers southeast of downtown Benxi, Liaoning, China.

Its valley, sandwiched between two peaks, one high and one rather low, looks like an area defended by closed gates, so Guanmenshan is called "Closed Gate (Guanmen) Mountain". It is famous for its autumn maple leaves. Guanmenshan is part of Benxi Guanmenshan National Forest Park, a national 4A-level scenic spot.

== Gallery ==
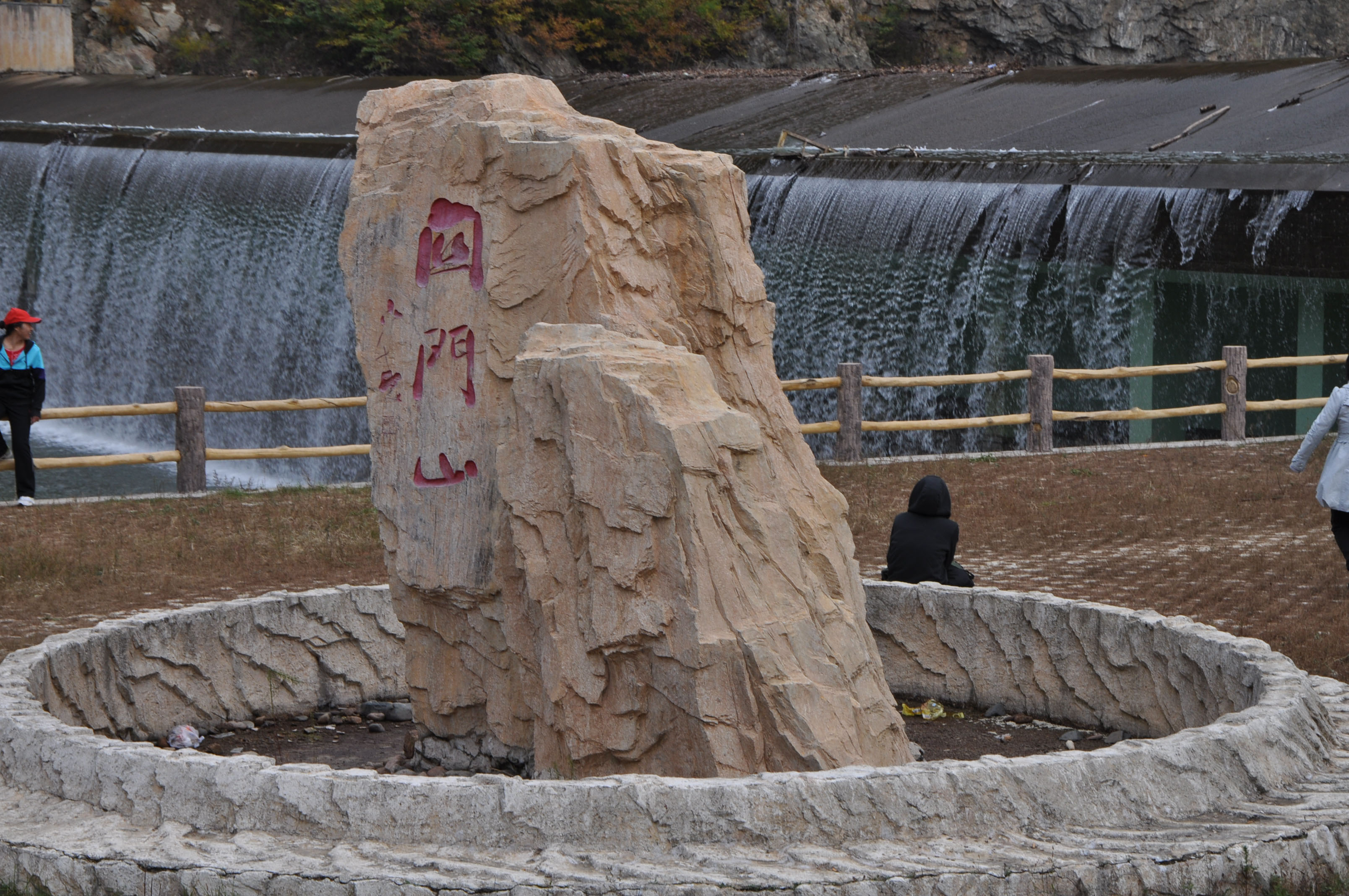
The entrance to Guanmenshan National Forest Park

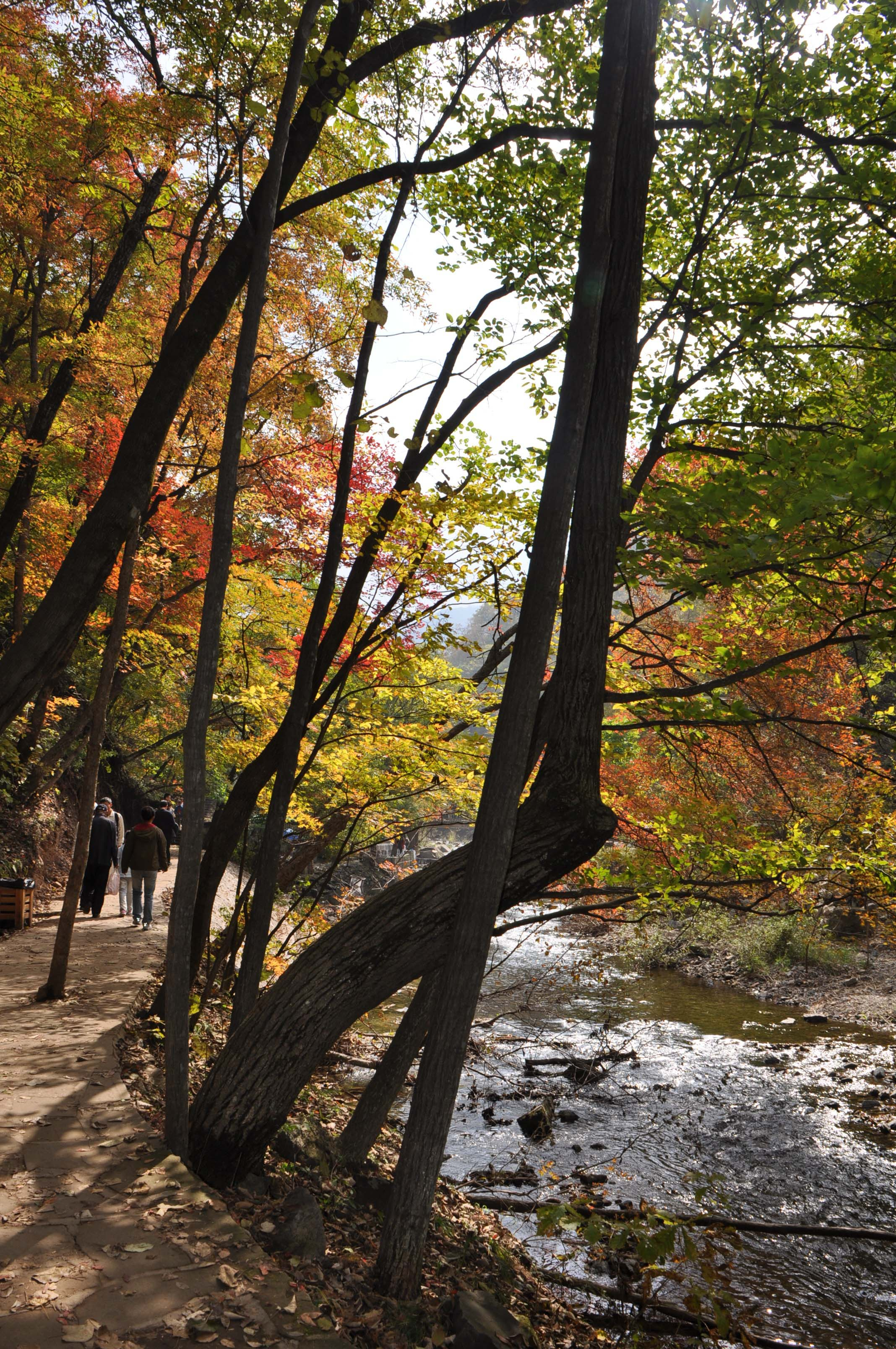
In the upstream of a creek

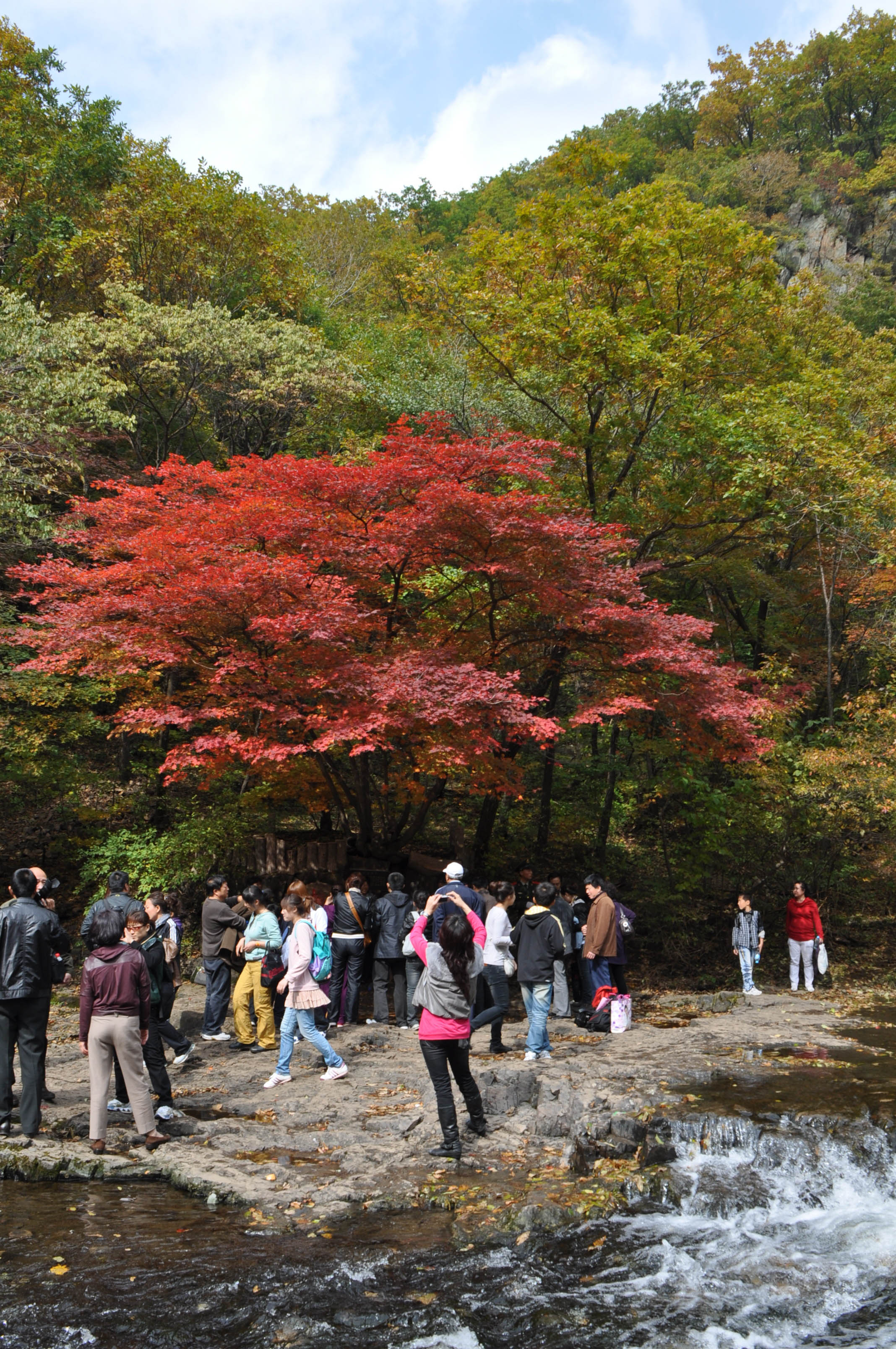
The "King of Maples" in the upstream of a creek

== See also ==
- Tourist activities of Benxi
- AAAA Tourist Attractions of China
