= Huanren Manchu Autonomous County =

Huanren 桓仁县 ᡥᡠᠸᠠᠨᡵᡝᠨ ᡥᡳᠶᠠᠨ
- Autonomous county
- 桓仁满族自治县 ᡥᡠᠸᠠᠨᡵᡝᠨ ᠮᠠᠨᠵᡠ ᠪᡝᠶᡝ ᡩᠠᠰᠠᠩᡤᠠ ᡥᡳᠶᠠᠨ; Huanren Manchu; Autonomous County
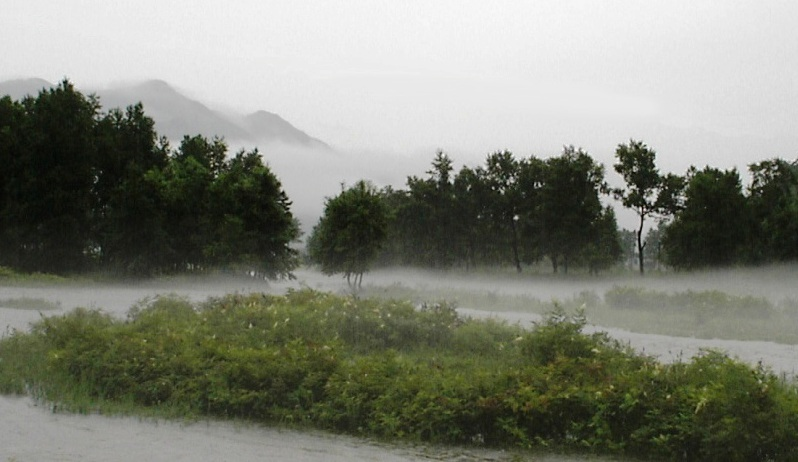

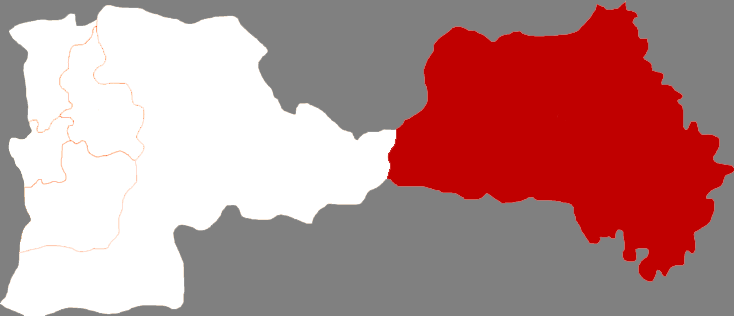
- Huanren County in Benxi City

- Location of the county seat in Liaoning
- Coordinates: 41°16′N 125°22′E
- Country: China
- Province: Liaoning
- Prefecture-level city: Benxi
- County seat: Huanren

Area
  - Total: 3,362 km^{2} (1,298 sq mi)
- Elevation: 251 m (823 ft)

Population (2020 census)
  - Total: 229,953
  - Density: 68.40/km^{2} (177.1/sq mi)
  - Major nationalities: Manchu Han
- Time zone: UTC+8 (China Standard)
- Postal code: 117200
- Area code: 0414
- Website: www.hr.gov.cn

Huanren Manchu Autonomous County (simplified Chinese: 桓仁满族自治县; traditional Chinese: 桓仁滿族自治縣; pinyin: Huánrén Mǎnzú Zìzhì Xìan, Manchu: ᡥᡠᠸᠠᠨᡵᡝᠨ ᠮᠠᠨᠵᡠ ᠪᡝᠶᡝ ᡩᠠᠰᠠᠩᡤᠠ ᡥᡳᠶᠠᠨ; Möllendorff: huwanren manju beye dasangga hiyan), formerly Huairen County (Chinese: 懷仁縣), is a county under the administration of Benxi City, in eastern Liaoning province, China, bordering Jilin to the east. It is also one of 11 Manchu autonomous counties and one of 117 autonomous counties nationally. As a county, Huanren was established in 1877. It was reorganised as an autonomous county in 1989 with approval of the State Council. The county covers 3,362 square kilometres (1,298 sq mi) and has 293,505 population (2000 census), and Huanren Town is its seat.

== Administrative divisions ==
Huanren County is divided into one subdistrict, eight towns and three townships and one ethnic township. The main nationalities in this county are Manchu, Han, Hui and Korean people.

Name	Simplified Chinese	Hanyu Pinyin	Manchu	Möllendorff	Korean
Subdistricts
Baguacheng Subdistrict	八卦城街道	Bāguàchéng Jiēdào	ᠪᠠ ᡤᡠᠠ ᠴᡥᡝᠩ ᠵᡠᡤᡡᠨ ᡤᡳᠶᠠ	ba gua cheng jugvn giya	팔괘성가도
Towns
Huanren Town	桓仁镇	Huánrén Zhèn	ᡥᡠᠸᠠᠨᡵᡝᠨ ᡴᠠᡩᠠᠯᠠᠩᡤᠠ	huwanren kadalangga	환인진
Pulebao Town	普乐堡镇	Pǔlèbǎo Zhèn	ᡦᡠ ᠯᡝ ᠪᠣᠣ ᡴᠠᡩᠠᠯᠠᠩᡤᠠ	pu le boo kadalangga	보락보진
Erpengdianzi Town	二棚甸子镇	Èrpéngdiànzǐ Zhèn	ᡝᡵ ᡦᡝᠩ ᡩᡳᠠᠨᡯᡳ ᡴᠠᡩᠠᠯᠠᠩᡤᠠ	er peng diandzi kadalangga	이붕전자진
Shajianzi Town	沙尖子镇	Shājiānzǐ Zhèn	ᡧᠠ ᠵᡳᠠᠨᡯᡳ ᡴᠠᡩᠠᠯᠠᠩᡤᠠ	ša jiandzi kadalangga	사첨자진
Wulidianzi Town	五里甸子镇	Wǔlǐdiànzǐ Zhèn	ᠸᡠ ᠯᡳ ᡩᡳᠠᠨᡯᡳ ᡴᠠᡩᠠᠯᠠᠩᡤᠠ	wu li diandzi kadalangga	오리전자
Balidianzi Town	八里甸子镇	Bālǐdiànzǐ Zhèn	ᠪᠠ ᠯᡳ ᡩᡳᠠᠨᡯᡳ ᡴᠠᡩᠠᠯᠠᠩᡤᠠ	ba li diandzi kadalangga	팔리전자진
Hualai Town	华来镇	Huálái Zhèn	ᡥᡠᠠ ᠯᠠᡳ ᡴᠠᡩᠠᠯᠠᠩᡤᠠ	hua lai kadalangga	화래진
Gucheng Town	古城镇	Gǔchéng Zhèn	ᡤᡠ ᠴᡝᠩ ᡴᠠᡩᠠᠯᠠᠩᡤᠠ	gu ceng kadalangga	고성진
Townships
Xiangyang Township	向阳乡	Xiàngyáng Xiāng	ᠰᡳᠠᠩ ᠶᠠᠩ ᡤᠠᡧᠠᠨ	siang yang gašan	향양향
Heigou Township	黑沟乡	Hēigōu Xiāng	ᡥᡝᡳ ᡤᠣᡠ ᡤᠠᡧᠠᠨ	hei gou gašan	흑구향
Beidianzi Township	北甸子乡	Běidiànzǐ Xiāng	ᠪᡝᡳ ᡩᡳᠠᠨᡯᡳ ᡤᠠᡧᠠᠨ	bei diandzi gašan	배전자향
Ethnic Townships
Yahe Korean Ethnic Township	雅河朝鲜族乡	Xiàlùhé Cháoxiǎnzú Xiāng	ᠶᠠ ᡥᡝ ᠴᠣᠣᡥᡳᠶᠠᠨ ᡠᡴᠰᡠᡵᠠᡳ ᡤᠠᡧᠠᠨ	ya he coohiyan uksurai gašan	아하조선족향

== Climate ==
Huanren has a monsoon-influenced humid continental climate (Köppen Dwa) with hot and humid summers and rather long, cold, and very dry winters. More than two-thirds of the annual rainfall occurs from June thru August. Monthly 24-hour average temperatures range from −12.4 °C (9.7 °F) in January to 23.0 °C (73.4 °F) in July, for an annual average of 6.93 °C (44.5 °F).

Climate data for Huanren, elevation 246 m (807 ft), (1991–2020 normals, extremes 1981–present)
Month	Jan	Feb	Mar	Apr	May	Jun	Jul	Aug	Sep	Oct	Nov	Dec	Year
Record high °C (°F)	4.9 (40.8)	13.3 (55.9)	24.2 (75.6)	29.3 (84.7)	33.6 (92.5)	35.6 (96.1)	35.9 (96.6)	37.9 (100.2)	31.5 (88.7)	26.7 (80.1)	18.6 (65.5)	9.7 (49.5)	37.9 (100.2)
Mean daily maximum °C (°F)	−5.0 (23.0)	−0.3 (31.5)	6.8 (44.2)	15.9 (60.6)	22.4 (72.3)	26.0 (78.8)	28.2 (82.8)	27.7 (81.9)	23.2 (73.8)	15.7 (60.3)	5.2 (41.4)	−3.1 (26.4)	13.6 (56.4)
Daily mean °C (°F)	−12.0 (10.4)	−7.2 (19.0)	0.6 (33.1)	9.1 (48.4)	15.7 (60.3)	20.2 (68.4)	23.2 (73.8)	22.2 (72.0)	16.1 (61.0)	8.5 (47.3)	−0.4 (31.3)	−8.9 (16.0)	7.3 (45.1)
Mean daily minimum °C (°F)	−17.6 (0.3)	−13.2 (8.2)	−4.8 (23.4)	2.8 (37.0)	9.4 (48.9)	15.1 (59.2)	19.3 (66.7)	18.3 (64.9)	11.0 (51.8)	2.7 (36.9)	−5.1 (22.8)	−13.9 (7.0)	2.0 (35.6)
Record low °C (°F)	−30.6 (−23.1)	−30.1 (−22.2)	−29.4 (−20.9)	−10.2 (13.6)	−2.9 (26.8)	5.6 (42.1)	10.6 (51.1)	5.4 (41.7)	−2.0 (28.4)	−9.2 (15.4)	−23.3 (−9.9)	−30.2 (−22.4)	−30.6 (−23.1)
Average precipitation mm (inches)	5.8 (0.23)	11.2 (0.44)	18.3 (0.72)	39.4 (1.55)	68.6 (2.70)	107.4 (4.23)	208.0 (8.19)	220.9 (8.70)	71.6 (2.82)	49.5 (1.95)	32.6 (1.28)	9.8 (0.39)	843.1 (33.2)
Average precipitation days (≥ 0.1 mm)	4.4	4.8	6.0	8.4	11.5	12.7	14.7	13.3	7.9	7.8	7.7	6.1	105.3
Average snowy days	8.8	7.2	7.1	2.5	0	0	0	0	0	0.8	6.9	10.0	43.3
Average relative humidity (%)	65	60	56	53	61	72	81	83	79	69	67	67	68
Mean monthly sunshine hours	182.4	192.9	224.7	220.3	233.3	205.2	178.4	180.7	194.3	190.7	149.0	152.1	2,304
Percentage possible sunshine	61	64	60	55	52	45	39	43	53	56	51	53	53
Source: China Meteorological Administrationall-time August high

== Tourism ==
Wunu Mountain City, a Goguryeo site found in this county, is part of the combined UNESCO World Heritage Site that also includes sites in Ji'an, Jilin.
