= Baitaling Subdistrict =

Baitaling Subdistrict 白塔岭街道
- Urban Subdistrict
- Báitǎlǐng Jiēdào
- Location in Hebei Location in China
- Coordinates: 39°55′06″N 119°33′39″E
- Country: People's Republic of China
- Province: Hebei
- Prefecture-level city: Qinhuangdao
- District: Haigang

Area
  - Total: 10.16 km^{2} (3.92 sq mi)

Population (2010)
  - Total: 101,026
- Time zone: UTC+8 (China Standard)

Baitaling Subdistrict (Chinese: 白塔岭街道; pinyin: Báitǎlǐng Jiēdào) is an urban subdistrict located in Haigang District, Qinhuangdao, Hebei, China. According to the 2010 census, Baitaling Subdistrict had a population of 101,026, including 51,252 males and 49,774 females. The population was distributed as follows: 4,177 people aged under 14, 92,464 people aged between 15 and 64, and 4,385 people aged over 65.

== See also ==
- List of township-level divisions of Hebei
