= Haiyang, Hebei =

Haiyang 海阳镇
- Town
- Location in Hebei
- Coordinates: 39°57′12″N 119°32′35″E
- Country: People's Republic of China
- Province: Hebei
- Prefecture-level city: Qinhuangdao
- District: Haigang District
- Time zone: UTC+8 (China Standard)

Haiyang (simplified Chinese: 海阳; traditional Chinese: 海陽; pinyin: Hǎiyáng) is a town under the administration of Haigang District, Qinhuangdao, Hebei, China. As of 2020, it has 17 villages under its administration:

- Haiyang First Village (海阳一村)
- Haiyang Second Village (海阳二村)
- Haiyang Third Village (海阳三村)
- Haiyang Fourth Village (海阳四村)
- Fanzhuang Village (范庄村)
- Houzhuang Village (侯庄村)
- Guogaozhuang Village (郭高庄村)
- Liyuan Village (栗园村)
- Lipanzhuang Village (鲤泮庄村)
- Daweizhigang Village (大苇芝港村)
- Xiaoweizhigang Village (小苇芝港村)
- Wenjiawa Village (温家洼村)
- Qingshishan Village (青石山村)
- Daliying Village (大里营村)
- Xiwangling Village (西王岭村)
- Xitianjiagou Village (西田家沟村)
- Xinzhouzhuang Village (新周庄村)
