= Changmu, Qinghai =

Changmar 常牧镇 · འཕྲང་དམར་གྲོང་རྡལ། Changmu
- Town
- Location in Qinghai
- Coordinates: 35°48′17″N 101°36′32″E
- Country: China
- Province: Qinghai
- Autonomous prefecture: Hainan
- County: Guide

Area
  - Total: 1,232 km^{2} (476 sq mi)

Population (2010)
  - Total: 16,703
  - Density: 13.56/km^{2} (35.11/sq mi)
- Time zone: UTC+8 (China Standard)
- Postal code: 811701
- Local dialing code: 974

Changmar or Changmu (Tibetan: འཕྲང་དམར་གྲོང་རྡལ།, Chinese: 常牧镇) is a town in Guide County, Hainan Tibetan Autonomous Prefecture, Qinghai, China. In 2010, Changmar had a total population of 16,703 people: 8,324 males and 8,379 females: 4,433 under 14 years old, 11,266 aged between 15 and 64 and 1,044 over 65 years old.
