= Dayu County =

Dayu County 大余县 Tayu
- County
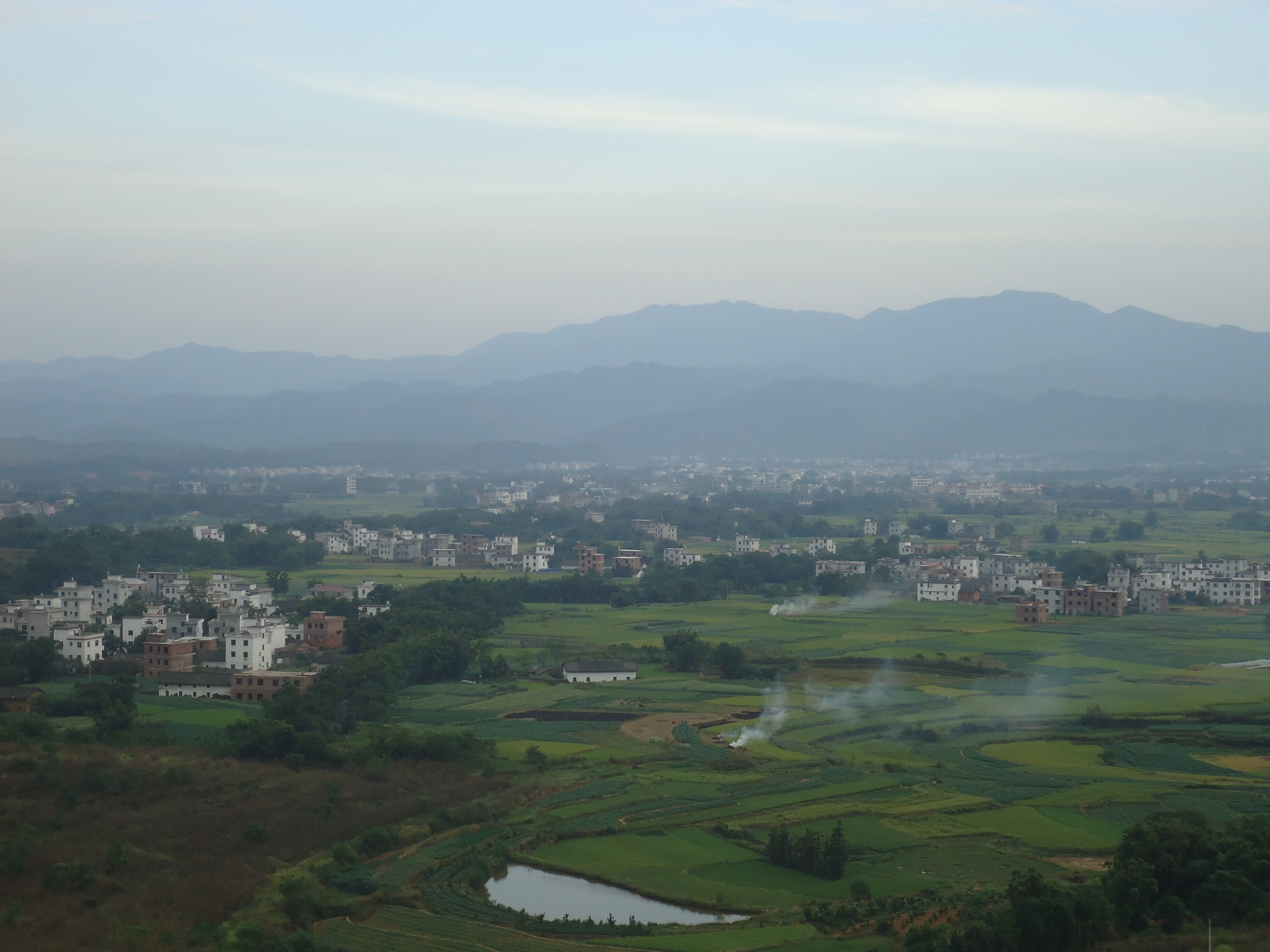

- Location in Jiangxi
- Coordinates: 25°24′07″N 114°21′43″E
- Country: People's Republic of China
- Province: Jiangxi
- Prefecture-level city: Ganzhou

Area
  - Total: 1,367.63 km^{2} (528.04 sq mi)

Population (2019)
  - Total: 337,700
  - Density: 246.9/km^{2} (639.5/sq mi)
- Postal Code: 341500
- Division code: DYX

Dayu (Chinese: 大余; pinyin: Dàyú) is a county in the west of the prefecture-level city of Ganzhou, in the southwest of Jiangxi Province, bordering Guangdong Province to the south. It is known for The Capital of Tungsten.

== Statistics ==
Dayu has an area of 1,367.63 km^{2} (528.04 sq mi). Total population is 280,000.

== Administration ==
The county executive, legislature, judiciary are at Nan'an Town (Nanan) (南安镇), together with the CPC and PSB branches.

Dayu County is divided to 8 towns and 3 townships.

8 towns

- Nan'an (南安镇)
- Xincheng (新城镇)
- Zhangdou (樟斗镇)
- Chijiang (池江镇)
- Qinglong (青龙镇)
- Zuoba (左拔镇)
- Huanglong (黄龙镇)
- Jicun (吉村镇)

3 townships

- Fujiang Township (浮江乡)
- Hedong Township (河洞乡)
- Neiliang Township (内良乡)

== Climate ==
Climate data for Dayu, elevation 216 m (709 ft), (1991–2020 normals, extremes 1981–present)
Month	Jan	Feb	Mar	Apr	May	Jun	Jul	Aug	Sep	Oct	Nov	Dec	Year
Record high °C (°F)	26.7 (80.1)	30.9 (87.6)	32.0 (89.6)	33.6 (92.5)	35.6 (96.1)	36.6 (97.9)	38.8 (101.8)	39.7 (103.5)	37.0 (98.6)	35.3 (95.5)	33.8 (92.8)	28.2 (82.8)	39.7 (103.5)
Mean daily maximum °C (°F)	13.2 (55.8)	15.9 (60.6)	18.7 (65.7)	24.6 (76.3)	28.5 (83.3)	31.1 (88.0)	33.6 (92.5)	33.2 (91.8)	30.5 (86.9)	26.6 (79.9)	21.4 (70.5)	15.6 (60.1)	24.4 (76.0)
Daily mean °C (°F)	8.4 (47.1)	10.9 (51.6)	14.1 (57.4)	19.5 (67.1)	23.4 (74.1)	26.1 (79.0)	27.7 (81.9)	27.3 (81.1)	24.8 (76.6)	20.5 (68.9)	15.3 (59.5)	9.9 (49.8)	19.0 (66.2)
Mean daily minimum °C (°F)	5.2 (41.4)	7.5 (45.5)	11.0 (51.8)	16.0 (60.8)	19.9 (67.8)	22.7 (72.9)	23.7 (74.7)	23.5 (74.3)	21.1 (70.0)	16.3 (61.3)	11.3 (52.3)	6.1 (43.0)	15.4 (59.7)
Record low °C (°F)	−4.6 (23.7)	−3.4 (25.9)	−2.2 (28.0)	3.6 (38.5)	10.2 (50.4)	13.9 (57.0)	18.8 (65.8)	18.7 (65.7)	12.3 (54.1)	4.2 (39.6)	−0.5 (31.1)	−7.2 (19.0)	−7.2 (19.0)
Average precipitation mm (inches)	74.6 (2.94)	91.6 (3.61)	178.4 (7.02)	183.3 (7.22)	240.5 (9.47)	250.2 (9.85)	146.2 (5.76)	170.0 (6.69)	107.9 (4.25)	51.3 (2.02)	64.1 (2.52)	48.4 (1.91)	1,606.5 (63.26)
Average precipitation days (≥ 0.1 mm)	12.2	13.2	18.5	17.5	18.3	18.7	14.0	15.1	10.7	6.2	8.5	8.5	161.4
Average snowy days	0.9	0.6	0.1	0	0	0	0	0	0	0	0	0.3	1.9
Average relative humidity (%)	78	79	83	82	83	84	79	81	80	76	77	75	80
Mean monthly sunshine hours	87.5	79.7	71.5	95.1	120.9	141.1	228.9	211.3	172.3	169.4	137.1	127.0	1,641.8
Percentage possible sunshine	26	25	19	25	29	34	55	53	47	48	42	39	37
Source: China Meteorological Administration
