= Xihu District, Benxi =

Xihu District 溪湖区
- District
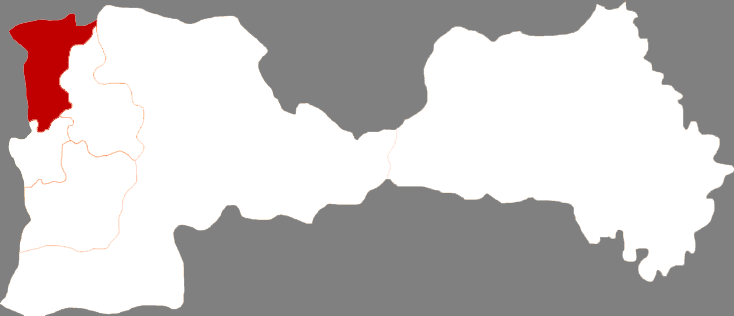
- Xihu in Benxi

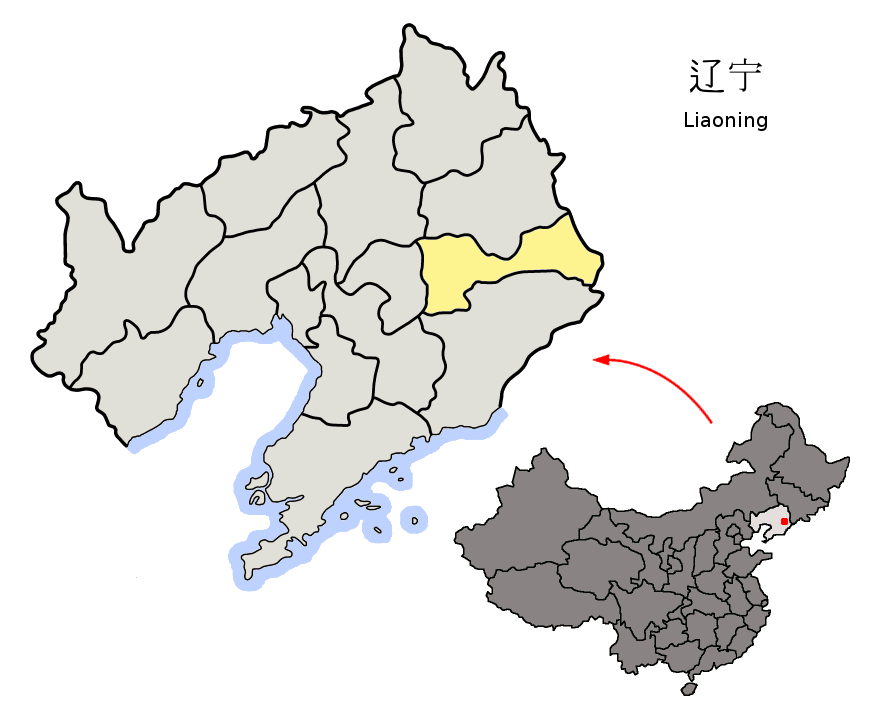
- Benxi in Liaoning
- Coordinates: 41°19′44″N 123°46′05″E
- Country: People's Republic of China
- Province: Liaoning
- Prefecture-level city: Benxi

Area
  - District: 317.3 km^{2} (122.5 sq mi)

Population (2020 census)
  - District: 204,660
  - Density: 645.0/km^{2} (1,671/sq mi)
  - Urban: 186,994
- Time zone: UTC+8 (China Standard)

Xihu District (simplified Chinese: 溪湖区; traditional Chinese: 溪湖區; pinyin: Xīhú Qū) is a District under the administration of the city of Benxi, Liaoning province, People's Republic of China. It has a total area of 320 square kilometres (120 sq mi), and a population of approximately 200,000 people as of 2020.

== Administrative divisions ==
There are six subdistricts, three towns, and one township in the district.

Subdistricts:

- Hedong Subdistrict (河东街道), Hexi Subdistrict (河西街道), Caitun Subdistrict (彩屯街道), Caibei Subdistrict (彩北街道), Shujing Subdistrict (竖井街道), Dongfeng Subdistrict (东风街道)

Towns:

- Huolianzhai (火连寨镇), Shiqiaozi (石桥子镇), Waitoushan (歪头山镇)

The only township is Zhangqizhai Township (张其寨乡)
