= Xinjie Township, Qinghai =

Xinjie Hui Ethnic Township 新街回族乡 ཀབ་རོན་ཧོས་རིགས་ཡུལ་ཚོ། Gabroin
- Township
- Location in Qinghai
- Coordinates: 35°42′53″N 101°22′31″E
- Country: China
- Province: Qinghai
- Autonomous prefecture: Hainan
- County: Guide

Area
  - Total: 92.56 km^{2} (35.74 sq mi)

Population (2010)
  - Total: 4,730
  - Density: 51.1/km^{2} (132/sq mi)
- Time zone: UTC+8 (China Standard)
- Local dialing code: 974

Xinjie Hui Ethnic Township or Gabroin Hui Ethnic Township (Chinese: 新街回族乡, Tibetan: ཀབ་རོན་ཧོས་རིགས་ཡུལ་ཚོ།) is a township in Guide County, Hainan Tibetan Autonomous Prefecture, Qinghai, China. In 2010, Xinjie Township had a total population of 4,730 people: 2,378 males and 2,352 females: 1,228 under 14 years old, 3,155 aged between 15 and 64 and 347 over 65 years old.
