= Hedong, Wuwei =

Hedong 河东镇
- Town
- Location in Gansu
- Coordinates: 37°45′16″N 102°47′26″E
- Country: People's Republic of China
- Province: Gansu
- Prefecture-level city: Wuwei
- District: Liangzhou
- Village-level divisions: 1 residential community and 12 villages
- Elevation: 1,681 m (5,515 ft)
- Time zone: UTC+8 (China Standard)
- Area code: 0935

Hedong (simplified Chinese: 河东; traditional Chinese: 河東; pinyin: Hédōng; lit. 'river east') is a town in Liangzhou District, Wuwei, Gansu, People's Republic of China, located 23 kilometres (14 mi) southeast of downtown Wuwei. As of 2018, it has one residential community and 12 villages under its administration.

== See also ==
- List of township-level divisions of Gansu
