= Hexi, Guide County =

Qurub 河西镇 · ཆུ་རུབ་གྲོང་རྡལ། Hexi
- town
- Location in Qinghai
- Coordinates: 36°2′5″N 101°23′5″E
- Country: China
- Province: Qinghai
- Autonomous prefecture: Hainan
- County: Guide

Population (2020)
  - Total: 19,408
- Time zone: UTC+8 (China Standard)

Qurub or Hexi (Tibetan: ཆུ་རུབ་གྲོང་རྡལ།, Chinese: 河西镇; pinyin: Héxī Zhèn; lit. 'west of river') is a town of Guide County, in the east of Hainan Tibetan Autonomous Prefecture in eastern Qinghai province, China. In the 2020 National Census it had a population of 19,408, making it the second largest town of Guide.
