= Hedong Township, Yuexi County =

Hedong Township 河东乡
- Township
- Location in Sichuan
- Coordinates: 28°39′35″N 102°31′58″E
- Country: People's Republic of China
- Province: Sichuan
- Autonomous prefecture: Liangshan Yi Autonomous Prefecture
- County: Yuexi
- Village-level divisions: 8 villages
- Elevation: 1,661 m (5,449 ft)
- Time zone: UTC+8 (China Standard)
- Area code: 0834

Hedong Township (simplified Chinese: 河东乡; traditional Chinese: 河東鄉; pinyin: Hédōng Xiāng; lit. 'river east') is a township of Yuexi County in southern Sichuan province, China, located adjacent to and northeast of the county seat. As of 2018, it has eight villages under its administration.
