= Hedong Township, De'an County =

Hedong Township 河东乡
- Township
- Location in Jiangxi Hedong Township (China)
- Coordinates: 29°20′18″N 115°46′3″E
- Country: People's Republic of China
- Province: Jiangxi
- Prefecture-level city: Jiujiang
- County-level city: De'an County
- Time zone: UTC+8 (China Standard)

Hedong Township (simplified Chinese: 河东乡; traditional Chinese: 河東鄉; pinyin: Hédōng Xiāng) is a township under the administration of De'an County, in northern Jiangxi, China. As of 2018, it has 2 residential communities and 4 villages under its administration.
