= Botou =

Botou 泊头市 Potow
- County-level city
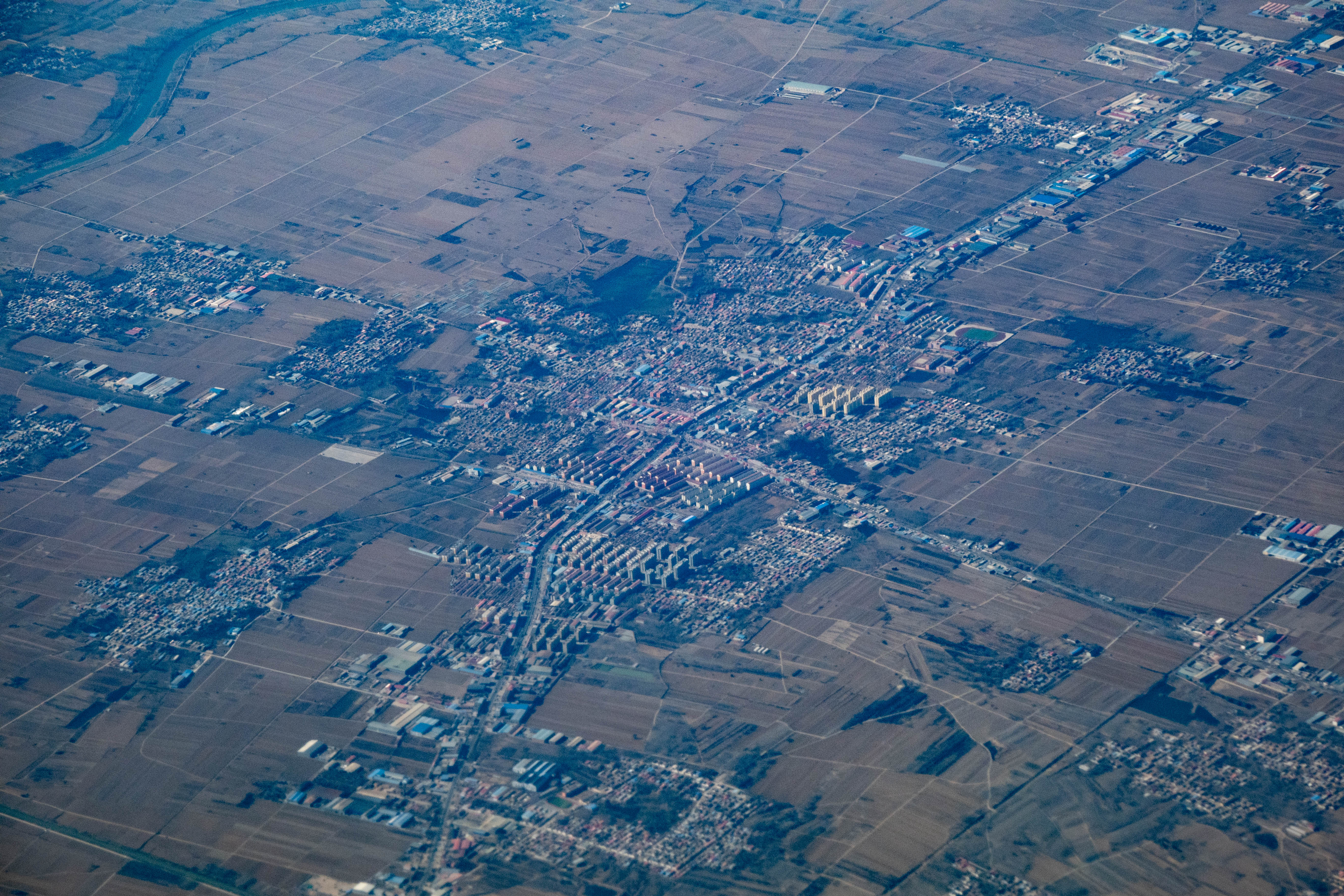
- Aerial view of Botou

- Location in Hebei
- Coordinates: 38°5′N 116°35′E
- Country: People's Republic of China
- Province: Hebei
- Prefecture-level city: Cangzhou
- Municipal seat: Bozhen (泊镇)

Area
  - County-level city: 1,007.0 km^{2} (388.8 sq mi)
- Elevation: 28 m (92 ft)

Population (2020)
  - County-level city: 573,842
  - Density: 569.85/km^{2} (1,475.9/sq mi)
  - Urban: 264,187
- Time zone: UTC+8 (China Standard)
- Postal code: 062650
- Area code: 0317
- Website: www.botou.gov.cn

Botou (simplified Chinese: 泊头; traditional Chinese: 泊頭; pinyin: Bótóu) is a county-level city in Hebei province, People's Republic of China, under the jurisdiction of Cangzhou prefecture-level city.

== Administrative Divisions ==
Subdistricts:

- Jiefang Subdistrict (解放街道), Hedong Subdistrict (河东街道), Gulou Subdistrict (古楼街道)

Towns:

- Bozhen (泊镇), Jiaohe (交河镇), Qiqiao (齐桥镇), Simencun (寺门村镇), Haocun (郝村镇), Fuzhen (富镇镇), Wenmiao (文庙镇), Waliwang (洼里王镇)

Townships:

- Wangwuzhuang Township (王武庄乡), Yingzi Township (营子乡), Siying Township (四营乡), Xixindian Township (西辛店乡)

== Climate ==
Climate data for Botou, elevation 13 m (43 ft), (1991–2020 normals, extremes 1981–2010)
Month	Jan	Feb	Mar	Apr	May	Jun	Jul	Aug	Sep	Oct	Nov	Dec	Year
Record high °C (°F)	16.4 (61.5)	23.4 (74.1)	30.5 (86.9)	34.0 (93.2)	40.2 (104.4)	41.1 (106.0)	41.6 (106.9)	38.7 (101.7)	36.1 (97.0)	31.3 (88.3)	25.7 (78.3)	18.2 (64.8)	41.6 (106.9)
Mean daily maximum °C (°F)	3.0 (37.4)	7.1 (44.8)	14.1 (57.4)	21.4 (70.5)	27.4 (81.3)	31.8 (89.2)	32.3 (90.1)	30.6 (87.1)	27.1 (80.8)	20.6 (69.1)	11.5 (52.7)	4.4 (39.9)	19.3 (66.7)
Daily mean °C (°F)	−2.6 (27.3)	1.1 (34.0)	7.8 (46.0)	15.0 (59.0)	21.2 (70.2)	25.9 (78.6)	27.5 (81.5)	26.0 (78.8)	21.5 (70.7)	14.6 (58.3)	6.0 (42.8)	−0.7 (30.7)	13.6 (56.5)
Mean daily minimum °C (°F)	−6.9 (19.6)	−3.5 (25.7)	2.5 (36.5)	9.3 (48.7)	15.3 (59.5)	20.4 (68.7)	23.2 (73.8)	22.0 (71.6)	16.7 (62.1)	9.7 (49.5)	1.7 (35.1)	−4.6 (23.7)	8.8 (47.9)
Record low °C (°F)	−18.5 (−1.3)	−16.8 (1.8)	−9.7 (14.5)	−2.4 (27.7)	4.2 (39.6)	10.0 (50.0)	16.0 (60.8)	13.9 (57.0)	5.1 (41.2)	−2.6 (27.3)	−14.6 (5.7)	−19.4 (−2.9)	−19.4 (−2.9)
Average precipitation mm (inches)	2.1 (0.08)	7.0 (0.28)	7.7 (0.30)	24.0 (0.94)	31.5 (1.24)	72.6 (2.86)	179.6 (7.07)	132.3 (5.21)	36.2 (1.43)	32.0 (1.26)	13.7 (0.54)	2.8 (0.11)	541.5 (21.32)
Average precipitation days (≥ 0.1 mm)	1.5	2.2	2.4	4.7	5.8	8.3	10.7	9.5	5.4	4.8	3.6	1.9	60.8
Average snowy days	2.7	2.5	0.8	0.2	0	0	0	0	0	0	1.0	1.8	9
Average relative humidity (%)	57	53	49	52	55	59	73	77	69	63	64	61	61
Mean monthly sunshine hours	176.9	180.9	235.6	244.9	271.7	238.5	198.7	206.2	212.8	202.6	170.1	166.4	2,505.3
Percentage possible sunshine	58	59	63	62	61	54	44	49	58	59	57	57	57
Source: China Meteorological Administration
