= Hedong Township, Qinghai =

Quxar Township 河东乡 · ཆུ་ཤར་ཡུལ་ཚོ། Hedong
- Township
- Location in Qinghai
- Coordinates: 36°02′31″N 101°27′51″E
- Country: China
- Province: Qinghai
- Autonomous prefecture: Hainan
- County: Guide
- Village-level divisions: 1 residential community, 15 villages
- Elevation: 2,259 m (7,411 ft)

Population (2020)
  - Total: 12,868
- Time zone: UTC+8 (China Standard)
- Area code: 0974

Quxar Township or Hedong Township (Tibetan: ཆུ་ཤར་ཡུལ་ཚོ།, Chinese: 河东乡; pinyin: Hédōng Xiāng; lit. 'river east') is a township of Guide County, in the east of Hainan Tibetan Autonomous Prefecture in eastern Qinghai province, China, located adjacent to and east of the county seat. As of 2018, it has one residential community and 15 villages under its administration. In the 2020 National Census it has a population of 12,868.
