= Hedong, Guazhou County =

Town in Guazhou County, china

Hedong 河东镇
- Town
- Location in Gansu
- Coordinates: 40°30′19″N 96°46′23″E
- Country: People's Republic of China
- Province: Gansu
- Prefecture-level city: Jiuquan
- County: Guazhou
- Village-level divisions: 4 villages
- Elevation: 1,393 m (4,570 ft)
- Time zone: UTC+8 (China Standard)
- Area code: 0937

Hedong (simplified Chinese: 河东; traditional Chinese: 河東; pinyin: Hédōng; lit. 'river east') is a town of Guazhou County in northwestern Gansu province, China, located 84 kilometres (52 mi) due east of the county seat and 170 km (110 mi) northwest of Jiuquan as the crow flies. As of 2018, it has four villages under its administration.
