= Hedong Subdistrict, Qinhuangdao =

Hedong Subdistrict 河东街道
- Subdistrict
- Location in Hebei
- Coordinates: 39°55′48″N 119°37′31″E
- Country: People's Republic of China
- Province: Hebei
- Prefecture-level city: Qinhuangdao
- District: Haigang District
- Village-level divisions: 7 residential communities
- Elevation: 4 m (13 ft)
- Time zone: UTC+8 (China Standard)
- Area code: 0335

Hedong Subdistrict (simplified Chinese: 河东街道; traditional Chinese: 河東街道; pinyin: Hédōng Jiēdào; lit. 'river east') is a subdistrict of Haigang District, in the eastern part of Qinhuangdao, Hebei, People's Republic of China. As of 2018, it has seven residential communities (社区) under its administration.

== See also ==
- List of township-level divisions of Hebei
