= Hedong Subdistrict, Fuyang =

Subdistrict of Fuyang, Anhui, China

Coordinates: 32.9157°N 115.8525°E

Hedong Subdistrict (河东街道) is a subdistrict of Yingdong District, Fuyang, Anhui, China.
