= Guide County =

Guide County 贵德县 • ཁྲི་ཀ་རྫོང་།
- County
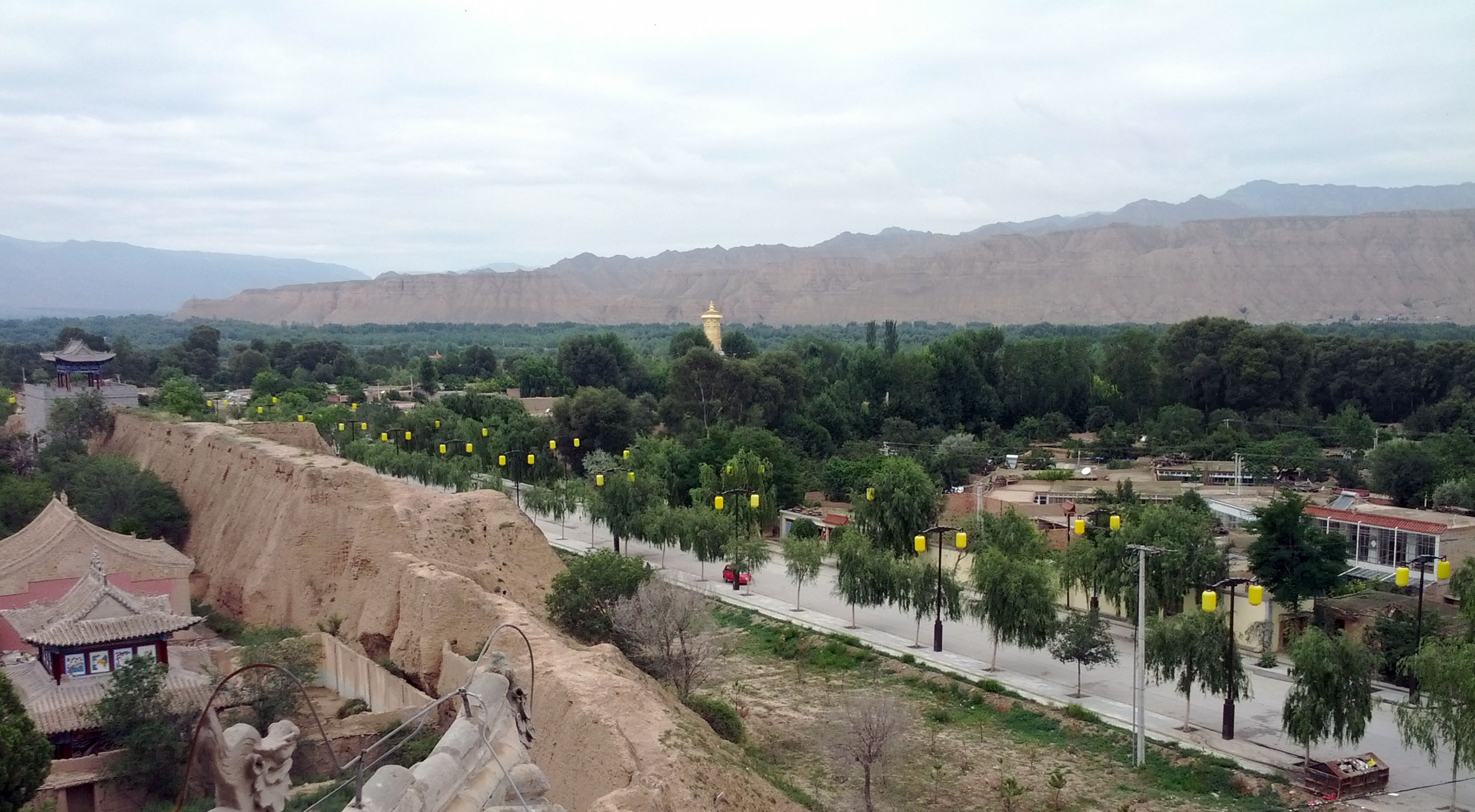

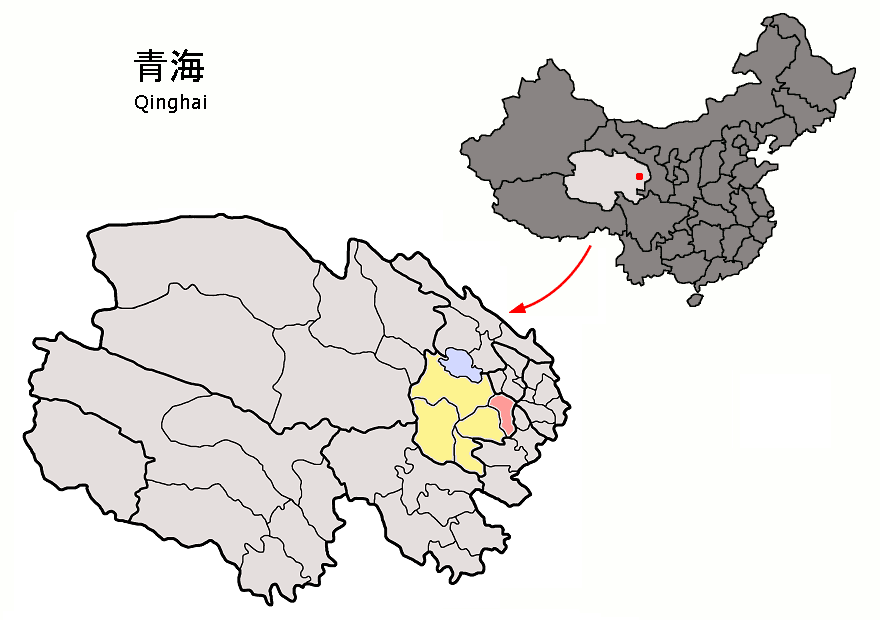
- Guide County (light red) within Hainan Prefecture (yellow) and Qinghai

- Location of the seat in Qinghai
- Coordinates: 35°59′20″N 101°28′16″E
- Country: China
- Province: Qinghai
- Autonomous prefecture: Hainan
- County seat: Qusib (Heyin)

Area
  - Total: 3,504 km^{2} (1,353 sq mi)
- Highest elevation: 5,011 m (16,440 ft)
- Lowest elevation: 2,710 m (8,890 ft)

Population (2020)
  - Total: 105,645
  - Density: 30.15/km^{2} (78.09/sq mi)
- Time zone: UTC+8 (China Standard)
- Website: www.guide.gov.cn

Guide County

Chinese name
- Simplified Chinese: 贵德县
- Traditional Chinese: 貴德縣
Transcriptions
Standard Mandarin
- Hanyu Pinyin: Guìdé Xiàn
Yue: Cantonese
- Jyutping: gwai^{3}dak^{1} jyun^{2}

Tibetan name
- Tibetan: ཁྲི་ཀ་རྫོང་།
Transcriptions
- Wylie: khri ka rdzong
- Tibetan Pinyin: Triga Zong

Guide County (Chinese: 贵德县, Tibetan: ཁྲི་ཀ་རྫོང་།) is a county in the east of Qinghai Province, China. It is under the administration of Hainan Tibetan Autonomous Prefecture. In Tibetan it is known as Trika. In 2015 it had a population of 108,800, of which 37.8% Tibetans, and 16.1% other ethnic minorities. In 2018 the population was 110,900.

It is located along the Yellow River, surrounded by hilly terrain on either side of the river valley.

Guide was first established during the Yuan dynasty. The area became part of Ming Dynasty China in 1370. In 1953 it was placed under jurisdiction of Hainan prefecture.

== Guide old town ==
The city's earthen walls and buildings were built between 1375 and 1380. The city was enlarged in 1590. After the founding of the People's Republic, the moats were filled in and the North and South gates were pulled down, as well as the towers. In 2010 work commenced to restore the gates and towers.

== Economics ==
Guide is known in Qinghai as a fruit producing county, in particular for pear cultivation, as it has a relatively mild climate. The Laxiwa Dam in Guide is the largest hydropower station on the upper reaches of the Yellow River.

== Administrative divisions ==
Guide governs over 4 towns, 2 townships, and 1 ethnic township. The county seat is in Qusib (Heyin).

Name	Simplified Chinese	Hanyu Pinyin	Tibetan	Wylie	Administrative division code
Towns
Qusib Town (Masib, Heyin)	河阴镇	Héyīn Zhèn	ཆུ་སྲིབ་གྲོང་རྡལ།	chu srib grong brdal	632523100
Qurub Town (Hexi)	河西镇	Héxī Zhèn	ཆུ་རུབ་གྲོང་རྡལ།	chu rub grong brdal	632523101
Lasêwa Town (Laxiwa)	拉西瓦镇	Lāxīwǎ Zhèn	ལ་ཟེ་བ་གྲོང་རྡལ།	la ze ba grong brdal	632523102
Changmar Town (Changmu)	常牧镇	Chángmù Zhèn	འཕྲང་དམར་གྲོང་རྡལ།	'phrang dmar grong brdal	632523103
Townships
Quxar Township (Hedong)	河东乡	Hédōng Xiāng	ཆུ་ཤར་ཡུལ་ཚོ།	chu shar yul tsho	632523200
Garji Township (Garing, Garang)	尕让乡	Gǎràng Xiāng	དཀར་བརྗིད་ཞང་།	dkar brjid zhang	632523202
Ethnic township
Gabroin Hui Ethnic Township (Gabroinxung, Xinjie)	新街回族乡	Xīnjiē Huízú Xiāng	ཀབ་རོན་ཧོས་རིགས་ཡུལ་ཚོ།	kab ron hos rigs yul tsho	632523201

== Climate ==
Climate data for Guide, elevation 2,273 m (7,457 ft), (1991–2020 normals, extremes 1981–2010)
Month	Jan	Feb	Mar	Apr	May	Jun	Jul	Aug	Sep	Oct	Nov	Dec	Year
Record high °C (°F)	14.2 (57.6)	18.4 (65.1)	27.9 (82.2)	35.0 (95.0)	30.5 (86.9)	32.9 (91.2)	38.7 (101.7)	35.6 (96.1)	31.1 (88.0)	25.6 (78.1)	19.4 (66.9)	12.9 (55.2)	38.7 (101.7)
Mean daily maximum °C (°F)	3.9 (39.0)	7.8 (46.0)	13.3 (55.9)	18.6 (65.5)	21.6 (70.9)	24.3 (75.7)	26.5 (79.7)	26.1 (79.0)	21.5 (70.7)	16.4 (61.5)	10.7 (51.3)	5.2 (41.4)	16.3 (61.4)
Daily mean °C (°F)	−5.1 (22.8)	−1.0 (30.2)	4.7 (40.5)	10.3 (50.5)	14.0 (57.2)	17.2 (63.0)	19.4 (66.9)	18.9 (66.0)	14.1 (57.4)	7.8 (46.0)	1.1 (34.0)	−4.0 (24.8)	8.1 (46.6)
Mean daily minimum °C (°F)	−11.8 (10.8)	−7.8 (18.0)	−2.2 (28.0)	2.8 (37.0)	6.7 (44.1)	10.2 (50.4)	12.7 (54.9)	12.5 (54.5)	8.6 (47.5)	1.8 (35.2)	−5.4 (22.3)	−10.5 (13.1)	1.5 (34.7)
Record low °C (°F)	−21.8 (−7.2)	−19.1 (−2.4)	−15.1 (4.8)	−9.2 (15.4)	−3.5 (25.7)	1.3 (34.3)	4.1 (39.4)	3.2 (37.8)	−2.1 (28.2)	−12.0 (10.4)	−14.5 (5.9)	−20.2 (−4.4)	−21.8 (−7.2)
Average precipitation mm (inches)	0.5 (0.02)	0.5 (0.02)	2.7 (0.11)	14.6 (0.57)	32.7 (1.29)	41.3 (1.63)	50.5 (1.99)	54.7 (2.15)	42.7 (1.68)	14.2 (0.56)	2.1 (0.08)	0.3 (0.01)	256.8 (10.11)
Average precipitation days (≥ 0.1 mm)	1.1	0.8	2.2	4.3	8.9	11.7	12.2	11.1	11.4	5.6	1.3	0.7	71.3
Average snowy days	2.2	1.8	2.9	1.0	0.1	0	0	0	0	0.4	1.6	1.2	11.2
Average relative humidity (%)	42	39	38	42	51	58	60	61	66	61	50	46	51
Mean monthly sunshine hours	215.9	209.1	241.8	255.2	258.9	238.7	250.5	252.6	209.3	225.5	226.1	220.6	2,804.2
Percentage possible sunshine	69	67	65	64	59	55	57	61	57	66	74	73	64
Source: China Meteorological Administration

== Transport ==
The Guide General Aviation Airport started construction in 2018.

== See also ==
- List of administrative divisions of Qinghai
