= Hedong Township, Qu County =

Hedong Township 河东乡
- Township
- Location in Sichuan
- Coordinates: 30°57′07″N 107°03′06″E
- Country: People's Republic of China
- Province: Sichuan
- Prefecture-level city: Dazhou
- County: Qu
- Village-level divisions: 1 residential community, 5 villages
- Elevation: 318 m (1,043 ft)
- Time zone: UTC+8 (China Standard)
- Area code: 0818

Hedong Township (simplified Chinese: 河东乡; traditional Chinese: 河東鄉; pinyin: Hédōng Xiāng; lit. 'river east') is a township of Qu County in northeastern Sichuan province, China, located 15 kilometres (9.3 mi) northeast of the county seat. The township derives its name from the fact that is located on the southeast (left) bank of the Qu River. As of 2018, it has one residential community and five villages under its administration.
