= Hedong Subdistrict, Botou =

Hedong Subdistrict 河东街道
- Subdistrict
- Location in Hebei
- Coordinates: 38°03′58″N 116°34′40″E
- Country: People's Republic of China
- Province: Hebei
- Prefecture-level city: Cangzhou
- County-level city: Botou
- Village-level divisions: 18 residential communities
- Elevation: 14 m (46 ft)
- Time zone: UTC+8 (China Standard)
- Postal code: 062100
- Area code: 0317

Hedong Subdistrict (simplified Chinese: 河东街道; traditional Chinese: 河東街道; pinyin: Hédōng Jiēdào; lit. 'river east') is a subdistrict of the city of Botou, Hebei, People's Republic of China. As of 2018, it has 18 residential communities (居委会) under its administration.

== See also ==
- List of township-level divisions of Hebei
