= Hedong, Nanbu County =

Hedong 河东镇
- Town
- Location in Sichuan
- Coordinates: 31°21′47″N 106°04′34″E
- Country: People's Republic of China
- Province: Sichuan
- Prefecture-level city: Nanchong
- County: Nanbu
- Village-level divisions: 2 residential communities 9 villages
- Elevation: 374 m (1,227 ft)
- Time zone: UTC+8 (China Standard)
- Area code: 0817

Hedong (simplified Chinese: 河东; traditional Chinese: 河東; pinyin: Hédōng; lit. 'river east') is a town of Nanbu County in northeastern Sichuan province, China, located on the northeastern (left) bank of the Jialing River, across from the county seat. As of 2018, it has two residential communities (社区) and nine villages under its administration.
