= Hedong Township, Dayu County =

Hedong Township 河洞乡
- Township
- Location in Jiangxi Hedong Township (China)
- Coordinates: 25°19′55″N 114°6′3″E
- Country: People's Republic of China
- Province: Jiangxi
- Prefecture-level city: Ganzhou
- County-level city: Dayu County
- Time zone: UTC+8 (China Standard)

Hedong Township (simplified Chinese: 河洞乡; traditional Chinese: 河洞鄉; pinyin: Hédòng Xiāng) is a township under the administration of Dayu County, in southern Jiangxi, China. As of 2018, it has five villages under its administration.

== See also ==
- List of township-level divisions of Jiangxi
