= Donghe District =

Donghe 东河区 • ᠳ᠋ᠦᠩ ᠾᠧ ᠲᠣᠭᠣᠷᠢᠭ
- District
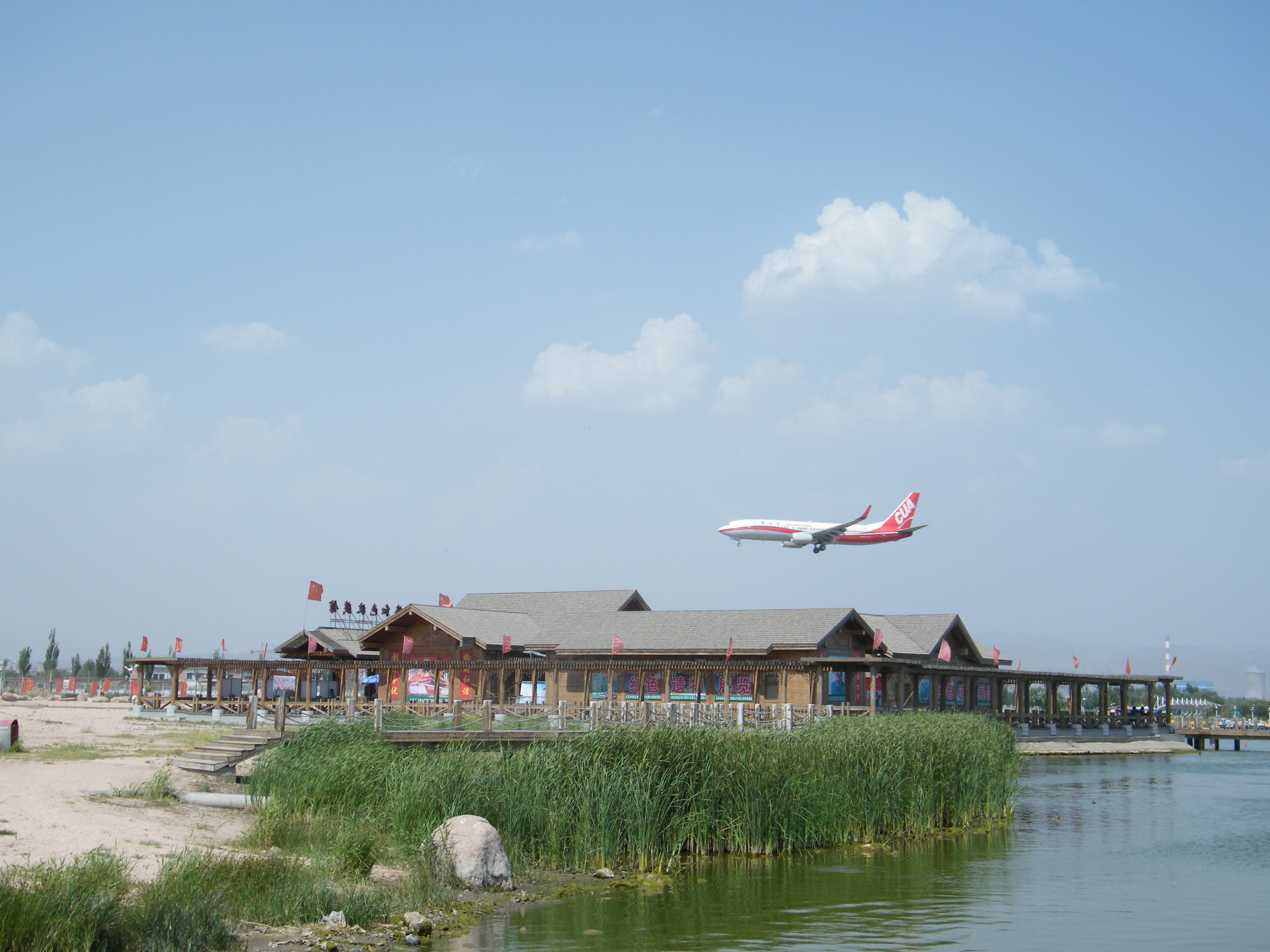
- Nanhai park, close to Baotou Donghe International Airport

- Location within Inner Mongolia Location within China
- Coordinates: 40°35′01″N 110°01′46″E
- Country: China
- Autonomous region: Inner Mongolia
- Prefecture-level city: Baotou
- District seat: Hedong Subdistrict

Area
  - Total: 457.6 km^{2} (176.7 sq mi)
- Elevation: 1,038 m (3,406 ft)

Population (2020)
  - Total: 484,218
  - Density: 1,058/km^{2} (2,741/sq mi)
- Time zone: UTC+8 (China Standard)
- Website: www.donghe.gov.cn

Donghe District

Chinese name
- Simplified Chinese: 东河区
- Traditional Chinese: 東河區
- Literal meaning: east river district
Transcriptions
Standard Mandarin
- Hanyu Pinyin: Dōnghé Qū

Mongolian name
- Mongolian Cyrillic: Донхэ дүүрэг
- Mongolian script: ᠳ᠋ᠦᠩ ᠾᠧ ᠲᠣᠭᠣᠷᠢᠭ
Transcriptions
- SASM/GNC: Düŋhė toɣoriɣ

Donghe District (Mongolian: ᠳ᠋ᠦᠩ ᠾᠧ ᠲᠣᠭᠣᠷᠢᠭ; Chinese: 东河区) is a district of Baotou, the largest city of Inner Mongolia, China. It contains the core of the "Old Baotou" before large-scale inward migration to other, newer districts.

The Baotou air disaster occurred in Nanhai park within Donghe.

== Administrative divisions ==
Donghe District is made up of 12 subdistricts and 2 towns.

Name	Simplified Chinese	Hanyu Pinyin	Mongolian (Hudum Script)	Mongolian (Cyrillic)	Administrative division code
Subdistricts
Heping Road Subdistrict	和平路街道	Hépínglù Jiēdào	ᠾᠧ ᠫᠢᠩ ᠵᠠᠮ ᠤᠨ ᠵᠡᠭᠡᠯᠢ ᠭᠤᠳᠤᠮᠵᠢ	Ге пин замын зээл гудамж	150202001
Caishenmiao Subdistrict	财神庙街道	Cáishénmiào Jiēdào	ᠼᠠᠢ ᠱᠧᠨ ᠮᠢᠶᠣᠤ ᠵᠡᠭᠡᠯᠢ ᠭᠤᠳᠤᠮᠵᠢ	Цай шен мяо зээл гудамж	150202002
West Obo Subdistrict	西脑包街道	Xīnǎobāo Jiēdào	ᠪᠠᠷᠠᠭᠤᠨ ᠣᠪᠣᠭ᠎ᠠ ᠵᠡᠭᠡᠯᠢ ᠭᠤᠳᠤᠮᠵᠢ	Баруун овоо зээл гудамж	150202003
Nanmenwai Subdistrict	南门外街道	Nánménwài Jiēdào	ᠨᠠᠨ ᠮᠧᠨ ᠸᠠᠢ ᠵᠡᠭᠡᠯᠢ ᠭᠤᠳᠤᠮᠵᠢ	Нон мен вай зээл гудамж	150202004
Nangedong Subdistrict	南圪洞街道	Nángēdòng Jiēdào	ᠨᠠᠨ ᠭᠧ ᠳ᠋ᠦᠩ ᠵᠡᠭᠡᠯᠢ ᠭᠤᠳᠤᠮᠵᠢ	Нон ге дүн зээл гудамж	150202005
East Station Subdistrict	东站街道	Dōngzhàn Jiēdào	ᠵᠡᠭᠦᠨ ᠥᠷᠲᠡᠭᠡ ᠶᠢᠨ ᠵᠡᠭᠡᠯᠢ ᠭᠤᠳᠤᠮᠵᠢ	Зүүн өрдөөгийн зээл гудамж	150202006
Huimin Subdistrict	回民街道	Huímín Jiēdào	ᠬᠣᠲᠣᠩ ᠠᠷᠠᠳ ᠤᠨ ᠵᠡᠭᠡᠯᠢ ᠭᠤᠳᠤᠮᠵᠢ	Хотон ардын зээл гудамж	150202007
Tianjiao Subdistrict	天骄街道	Tiānjiāo Jiēdào	ᠲᠢᠶᠠᠨ ᠵᠢᠶᠣᠤ ᠵᠡᠭᠡᠯᠢ ᠭᠤᠳᠤᠮᠵᠢ	Даяан жяо зээл гудамж	150202008
Hedong Subdistrict	河东街道	Hédōng Jiēdào	ᠾᠧ ᠳ᠋ᠦᠩ ᠵᠡᠭᠡᠯᠢ ᠭᠤᠳᠤᠮᠵᠢ	Ге дүн зээл гудамж	150202009
Tiexi Subdistrict	铁西街道	Tiěxī Jiēdào	ᠲᠢᠶᠧ ᠰᠢ ᠵᠡᠭᠡᠯᠢ ᠭᠤᠳᠤᠮᠵᠢ	Тие ший зээл гудамж	150202010
Dongxing Subdistrict	东兴街道	Dōngxīng Jiēdào	ᠳ᠋ᠦᠩ ᠰᠢᠩ ᠵᠡᠭᠡᠯᠢ ᠭᠤᠳᠤᠮᠵᠢ	Дүн шин зээл гудамж	150202011
Yanggeleng Subdistrict	杨圪塄街道	Yánggēléng Jiēdào	ᠶᠠᠩ ᠭᠧ ᠯᠧᠩ ᠵᠡᠭᠡᠯᠢ ᠭᠤᠳᠤᠮᠵᠢ	Ян ге лен зээл гудамж	150202012
Towns
Hedong Town	河东镇	Hédōng Zhèn	ᠾᠧ ᠳ᠋ᠦᠩ ᠪᠠᠯᠭᠠᠰᠤ	Ге дүн балгас	150202100
Salqin Town	沙尔沁镇	Shā'ěrqìn Zhèn	ᠰᠠᠯᠴᠢᠨ ᠪᠠᠯᠭᠠᠰᠤ	Салчин балгас	150202101

- Other: Aluminium Industrial Park (铝业工业园区)
