= Mingshan District, Benxi =

Mingshan District 明山区
- District
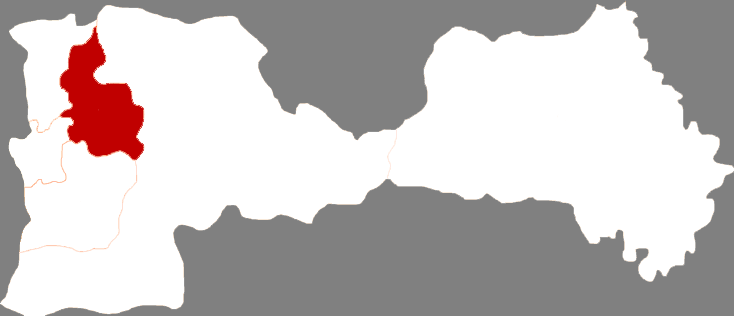
- Mingshan in Benxi

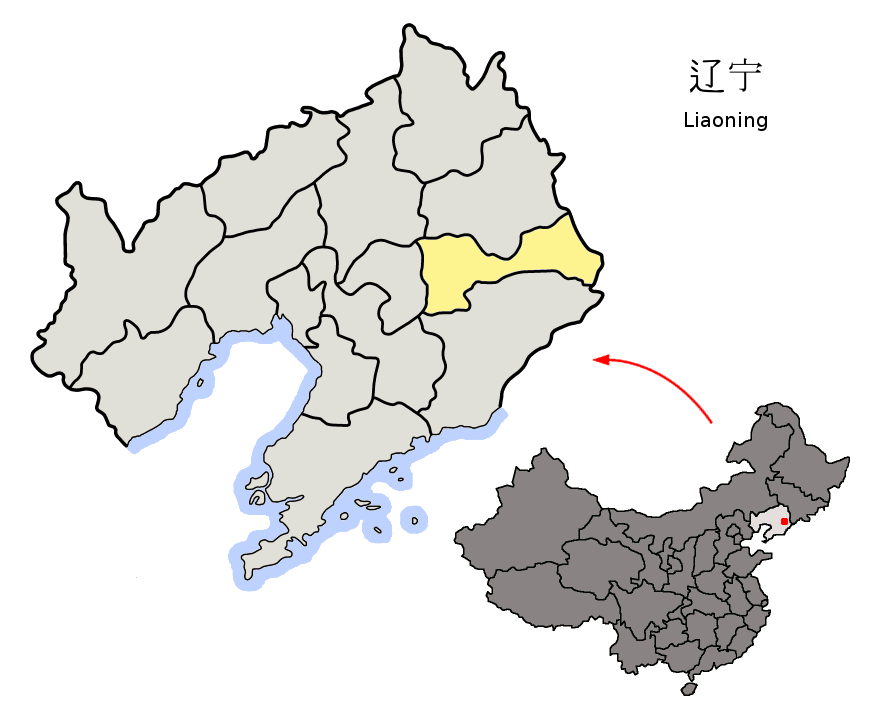
- Benxi in Liaoning
- Coordinates: 41°18′30″N 123°49′03″E
- Country: People's Republic of China
- Province: Liaoning
- Prefecture-level city: Benxi

Area
  - Land: 405.3 km^{2} (156.5 sq mi)

Population (2020 census)
  - Total: 378,936
  - Density: 935.0/km^{2} (2,422/sq mi)
- Time zone: UTC+8 (China Standard)

Mingshan District (simplified Chinese: 明山区; traditional Chinese: 明山區; pinyin: Míngshān Qū) is a district under the administration of the city of Benxi, Liaoning Province, China. It has a total area of 410 square kilometres (160 sq mi), and a population of approximately 380,000 as of 2020.

== Administrative divisions ==
There are seven subdistricts and two towns in the district.

Subdistricts:

- Jinshan Subdistrict (Chinese: 金山街道; pinyin: Jīnshān jiēdào)
- Dongxing Subdistrict (simplified Chinese: 东兴街道; traditional Chinese: 東興街道; pinyin: Dōngxìng jiēdào)
- Xinming Subdistrict (新明街道; Xīnmíng jiēdào)
- Gaoyu Subdistrict (高峪街道; Gāoyù jiēdào)
- Mingshan Subdistrict (明山街道; Míngshān jiēdào)
- Niuxintai Subdistrict (牛心台街道; 牛心臺街道; Niúxīntái jiēdào)
- Beidi Subdistrict (北地街道; Běidì jiēdào)

Towns:

- Wolong (卧龙镇; 臥龍鎮; Wòlóng zhèn)
- Gaotaizi (高台子镇; 高臺子鎮; Gāotáizǐ zhèn)
