= Haigang, Qinhuangdao =

Haigang 海港区
- District
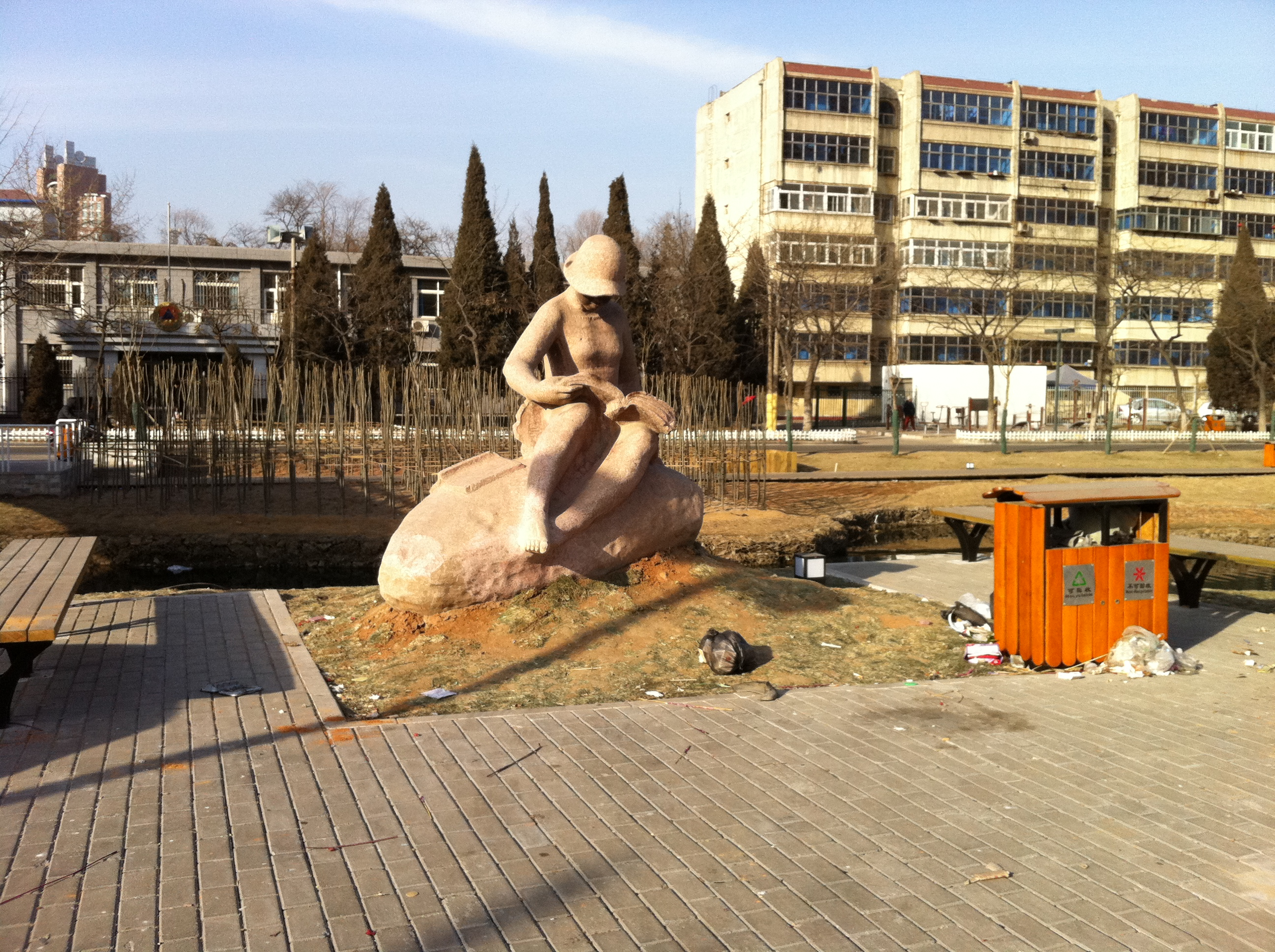

- Location in Hebei
- Coordinates: 39°56′04″N 119°36′37″E
- Country: China
- Province: Hebei
- Prefecture-level city: Qinhuangdao
- District seat: Wenhua Road Subdistrict

Area
  - Total: 121 km^{2} (47 sq mi)
- Elevation: 4.6 m (15 ft)

Population (2020 census)
  - Total: 1,024,876
  - Density: 8,470/km^{2} (21,900/sq mi)
- Time zone: UTC+8 (China Standard)
- Website: www.qhdhgq.gov.cn

Haigang (Chinese: 海港; pinyin: Hǎigǎng; lit. 'seaport') is a district of the coastal city of Qinhuangdao, Hebei province, China. The seat of the municipal government, as of 2004, it had a population of 550,000 residing in an area of 121 km^{2} (47 sq mi).

== Administrative divisions ==
There are 10 subdistricts and 8 towns in Haigang District.

10 subdistricts

- Wenhua Road Subdistrict (文化路街道)
- Haibin Road Subdistrict (海滨路街道)
- Beihuan Road Subdistrict (北环路街道)
- Jianshe Avenue Subdistrict (建设大街街道)
- Hedong Subdistrict (河东街道)
- Xigang Road Subdistrict (西港路街道)
- Yanshan Avenue Subdistrict (燕山大街街道)
- Gangcheng Avenue Subdistrict (港城大街街道)
- Donghuan Road Subdistrict (东环路街道)
- Baitaling Subdistrict (白塔岭街道)

8 towns

- Donggang (东港镇)
- Haigang Town (海港镇)
- Xigang (西港镇)
- Haiyang (海阳镇)
- Beigang (北港镇)
- Duzhuang (杜庄镇)
- Shimenzhai (石门寨镇)
- Zhucaoying (驻操营镇)

Others

- Lingang Logistics Park (临港物流园区)
- Haigang Economic Zone (海港经济开发区)
