= Benxi =

Benxi 本溪市
- Prefecture-level city
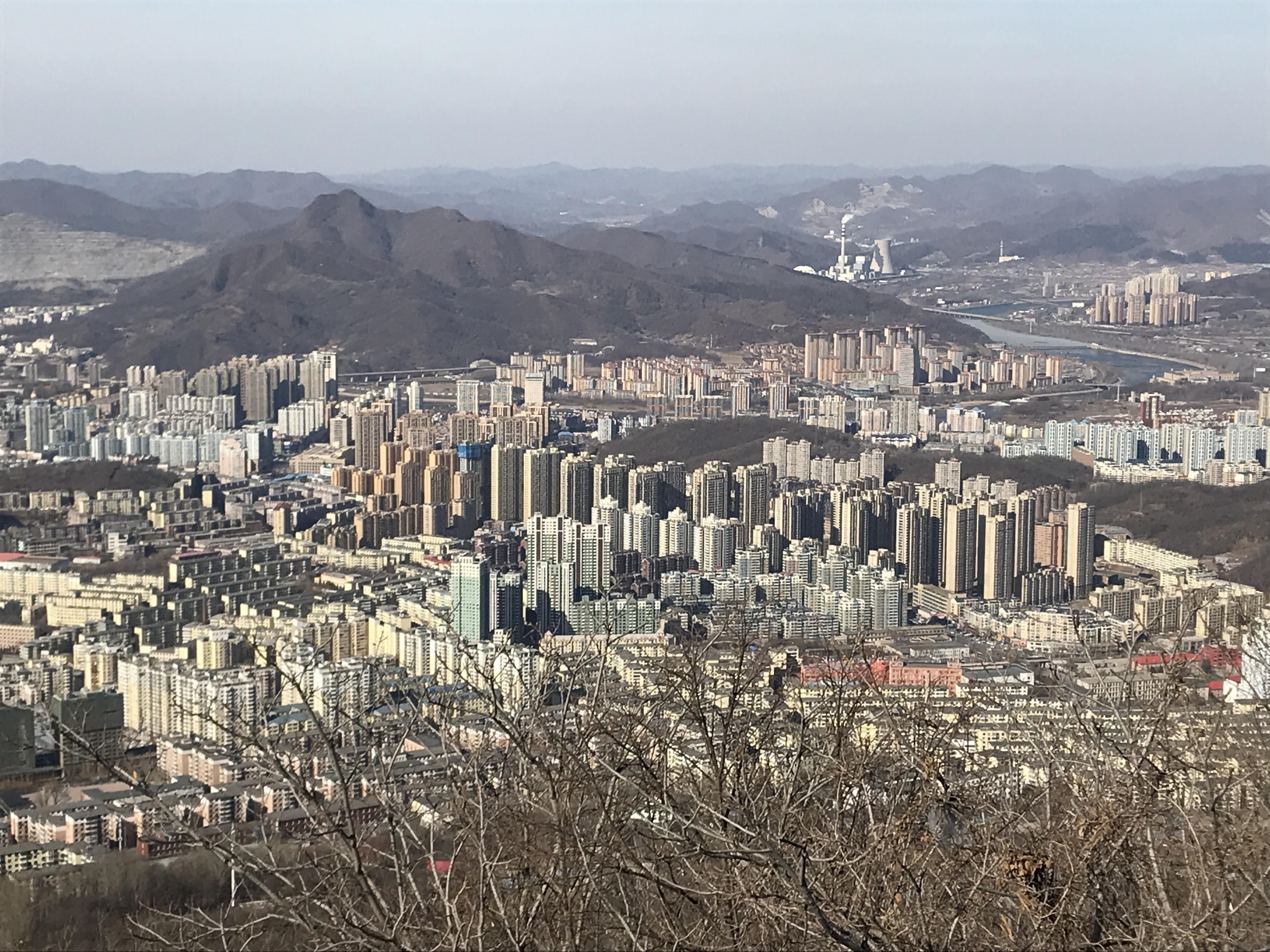

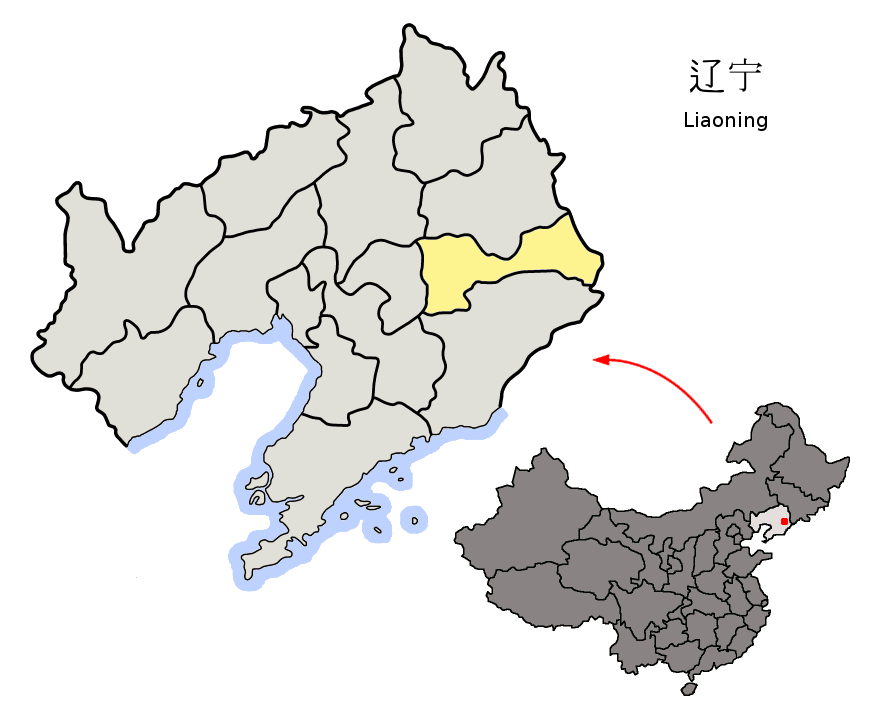
- Location of Benxi City jurisdiction in Liaoning

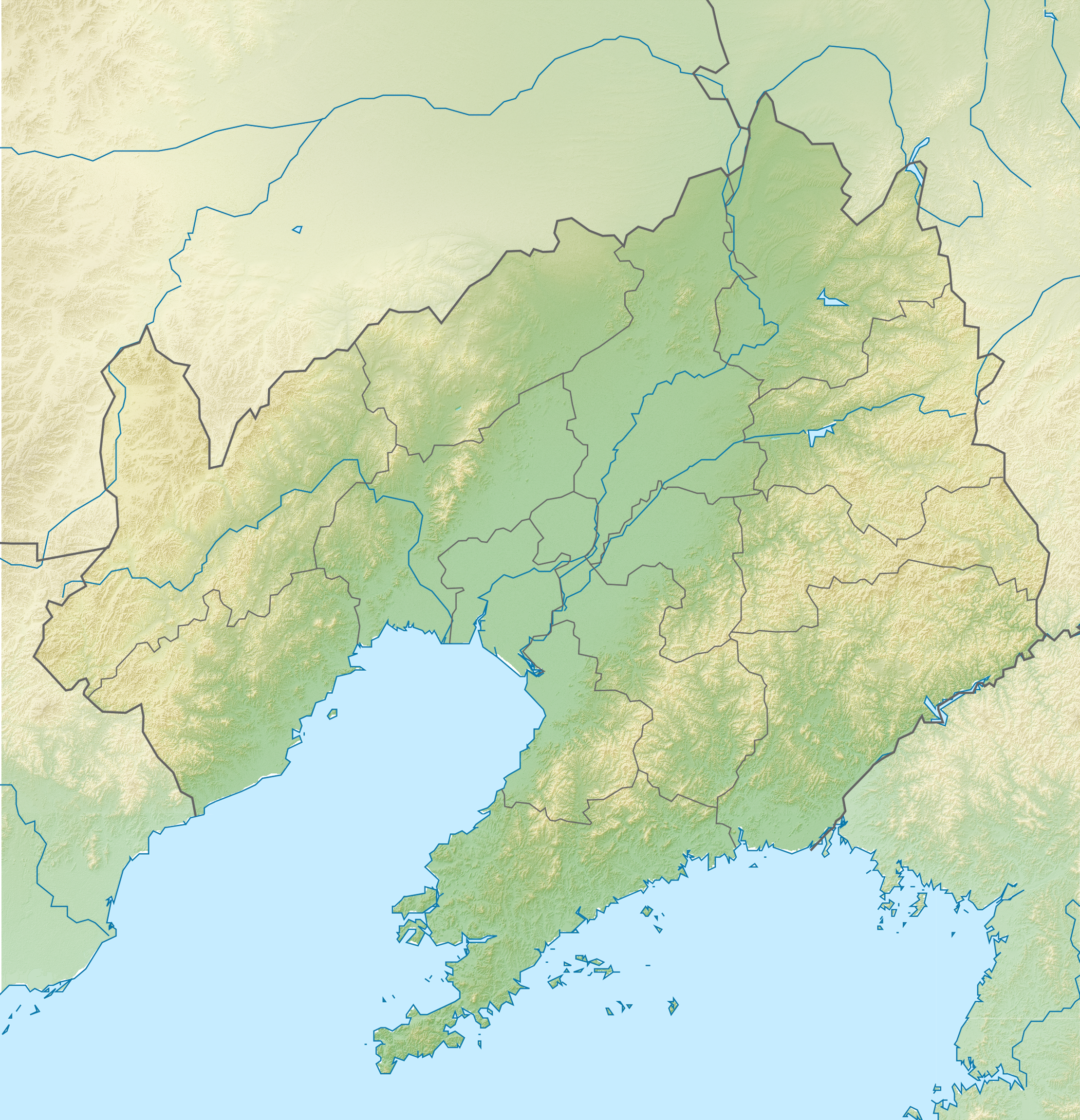
- Location of the city centre in Liaoning
- Coordinates (Benxi Bureau of Civil Affairs / 本溪市民政局): 41°18′14″N 123°45′54″E
- Country: People's Republic of China
- Province: Liaoning
- Municipal seat: Xihu District
- Districts and Counties: List: Pingshan District; Xihu District; Mingshan District; Nanfen District; Benxi Manchu Autonomous County; Huanren Manchu Autonomous County

Government
  - CPC Benxi: Committee Secretary
  - Mayor: Tian Shuhuai (田树槐)

Area
  - Prefecture-level city: 8,429 km^{2} (3,254 sq mi)
  - Urban: 1,516.8 km^{2} (585.6 sq mi)
  - Metro: 901.4 km^{2} (348.0 sq mi)
- Elevation: 131 m (430 ft)

Population (2020 census)
  - Prefecture-level city: 1,326,018
  - Density: 157.3/km^{2} (407.4/sq mi)
  - Urban: 865,215
  - Urban density: 570.42/km^{2} (1,477.4/sq mi)
  - Metro: 809,655
  - Metro density: 898.2/km^{2} (2,326/sq mi)

GDP
  - Prefecture-level city: CN¥ 116.5 billion US$ 18.7 billion
  - Per capita: CN¥ 67,656; US$ 10,862
- Time zone: UTC+8 (China Standard)
- Postal code: 117000
- Area code: 24
- ISO 3166 code: CN-LN-05
- Licence plates: 辽E
- Administrative division code: 210500
- Website: http://www.benxi.gov.cn/

Benxi
- Simplified Chinese: 本溪
- Traditional Chinese: 本溪
- Postal: Tzukung
Transcriptions
Standard Mandarin
- Hanyu Pinyin: Běnxī
- Wade–Giles: Pen^{3}-ch'i^{1}
- IPA: [pə̀n.ɕí]

Benxi (Chinese: 本溪) is a prefecture-level city located in the east of Liaoning province, People's Republic of China, southeast of the provincial capital of Shenyang. As of the 2020 census, its population was 1,326,018 (1,709,538 in 2010), of whom 809,655 lived in the built-up area made of 3 urban districts (Pingshan, Xihu and Mingshan). It was founded as a metallurgical center in 1915. Benxi Iron and Steel Company (Bengang) is the largest employer in the city, and used to be the fourth-largest steel company in China. The second-largest industry in Benxi is coal mining. The city has pollution problems due to steel production and coal mining.

== History ==
There were people living in Benxi prefecture 400,000 years ago, indicated by Miaohou Mountain ruins with human fossils and stone tools explored in this region.

On April 26, 1942 in Benxihu Colliery a coal-dust explosion killed 1,549 miners, making it the worst disaster in the history of coal mining and the second worst recorded industrial accident in the world. The explosion sent flames bursting out of the mine shaft entrance. Miners' relatives rushed to the site but were denied entry by a cordon of Japanese guards who erected electric fences to keep them out. In an attempt to curtail the fire underground, the Japanese shut off the ventilation and sealed the pit head. Witnesses say that the Japanese did not evacuate the pit fully before sealing it, trapping many Chinese workers underground to suffocate in the smoke.

The city is home to a notable number of Manchu and Hui people.

== Administrative divisions ==
Benxi is an important industrial city known for its iron and steel industry, mineral resources, and scenic natural landscapes.

Benxi is administratively divided into four districts and two autonomous counties. The four districts are; Pingshan, Xihu, Mingshan, and Nanfen. The two autonomous counties are Benxi Manchu Autonomous County and Huanren Manchu Autonomous County.

These administrative divisions support local governance, economic development, public services, and the preservation of the region’s cultural heritage, particularly the traditions of the Manchu ethnic group. Together, they form the administrative structure through which Benxi manages its urban and rural communities.

Map
#	Name	Chinese	Hanyu Pinyin	Population (2003 est.)	Area (km^{2})	Density (/km^{2})
1	Pingshan District	平山区	Píngshān Qū	350,000	177	1,977
2	Xihu District	溪湖区	Xīhú Qū	220,000	320	688
3	Mingshan District	明山区	Míngshān Qū	300,000	410	732
4	Nanfen District	南芬区	Nánfēn Qū	80,000	619	129
5	Benxi Manchu Autonomous County	本溪满族 自治县	Běnxī Mǎnzú; Zìzhìxiàn	300,000	3,362	89
6	Huanren Manchu Autonomous County	桓仁满族 自治县	Huánrén Mǎnzú; Zìzhìxiàn	300,000	3,547	85

Within these there are 25 counties, 40 villages and towns, 229 communities and 289 village committees.

== Geography ==
Benxi is located within latitude 40° 49'–41° 35' N and longitude 123° 34'–125° 46' E, and has a total area of 8,411.31 square kilometres (3,247.62 sq mi). It is bordered by Tonghua (Jilin) to the east, Dandong to the south, Liaoyang to the west, Shenyang to the northwest, and Fushun to the north. The area has many mountains as well as a high degree of forest coverage (74%).

=== Climate ===
Benxi has a monsoon-influenced humid continental climate (Köppen Dwa), characterised by hot, humid summers, due to the East Asian monsoon, and long, cold and windy, but dry winters, due to the Siberian anticyclone. The four seasons here are distinctive. Nearly half of the annual rainfall occurs in July and August alone. The monthly 24-hour average temperature ranges from −11.5 °C (11.3 °F) in January to 24.0 °C (75.2 °F) in July, and the annual mean is 7.83 °C (46.1 °F). With monthly percent possible sunshine ranging from 38% in July to 63% in February, the city receives 2,325 hours of bright sunshine annually.

Climate data for Benxi, elevation 185 m (607 ft), (1991–2020 normals, extremes 1955–present)
Month	Jan	Feb	Mar	Apr	May	Jun	Jul	Aug	Sep	Oct	Nov	Dec	Year
Record high °C (°F)	8.8 (47.8)	14.8 (58.6)	24.9 (76.8)	30.4 (86.7)	34.6 (94.3)	38.5 (101.3)	37.5 (99.5)	39.4 (102.9)	33.5 (92.3)	29.4 (84.9)	20.7 (69.3)	12.5 (54.5)	39.4 (102.9)
Mean daily maximum °C (°F)	−4.4 (24.1)	0.1 (32.2)	7.2 (45.0)	16.4 (61.5)	23.1 (73.6)	27.1 (80.8)	29.2 (84.6)	28.4 (83.1)	24.0 (75.2)	16.3 (61.3)	6.1 (43.0)	−2.2 (28.0)	14.3 (57.7)
Daily mean °C (°F)	−10.8 (12.6)	−6.0 (21.2)	1.6 (34.9)	10.4 (50.7)	17.1 (62.8)	21.6 (70.9)	24.5 (76.1)	23.3 (73.9)	17.5 (63.5)	9.7 (49.5)	0.5 (32.9)	−8.0 (17.6)	8.5 (47.2)
Mean daily minimum °C (°F)	−16.0 (3.2)	−11.2 (11.8)	−3.4 (25.9)	4.7 (40.5)	11.2 (52.2)	16.5 (61.7)	20.4 (68.7)	19.2 (66.6)	12.5 (54.5)	4.4 (39.9)	−4.0 (24.8)	−12.6 (9.3)	3.5 (38.3)
Record low °C (°F)	−34.5 (−30.1)	−29.4 (−20.9)	−23.1 (−9.6)	−13.2 (8.2)	−0.2 (31.6)	4.3 (39.7)	12.4 (54.3)	7.0 (44.6)	−0.1 (31.8)	−9.4 (15.1)	−22.1 (−7.8)	−31.4 (−24.5)	−34.5 (−30.1)
Average precipitation mm (inches)	8.0 (0.31)	11.6 (0.46)	18.6 (0.73)	42.6 (1.68)	67.0 (2.64)	109.5 (4.31)	179.4 (7.06)	193.6 (7.62)	59.0 (2.32)	50.2 (1.98)	31.1 (1.22)	13.1 (0.52)	783.7 (30.85)
Average precipitation days (≥ 0.1 mm)	4.7	4.8	6.0	7.4	9.5	12.4	13.6	12.4	7.8	7.2	6.9	5.7	98.4
Average snowy days	7.1	6.8	6.0	1.8	0	0	0	0	0	0.8	6.0	8.0	36.5
Average relative humidity (%)	63	57	52	48	55	66	75	78	72	65	63	65	63
Mean monthly sunshine hours	198.2	208.5	246.2	243.7	266.0	228.4	196.1	205.2	230.5	215.8	175.7	176.4	2,590.7
Percentage possible sunshine	67	69	66	61	59	51	43	48	62	64	60	62	59
Source: China Meteorological Administrationextremes

== Economy ==
Benxi's economy grew 10% in 2012 to a regional GDP of 111.24 billion CNY. Ranked eighth out of fourteen prefecture level cities in Liaoning, the city's GDP accounted for approximately 4% of provincial total. Urban per-capita disposable income was 22,466 CNY, and consumption per capita 16,064 CNY.

With 46 large and medium-sized enterprises in Benxi, main industrial products are raw iron (14 million tons), steel (13 million tons), finished steel (12 million tons), cement (3 million tons) and raw coal (1 million tons). In 2008, 92,615 people were employed in manufacturing, 20,368 in education, 19,228 in public administration and social organizations, 17,913 persons in the mining industry, and 12,997 in transportation and storage. According to the type of business ownership, 63,000 were employed in private companies.

Uranium is mined in the region.

As of 2009, Asia's biggest iron ore mine, which is reported to possess more than 3 billion tons of proven reserves, has been found in this region.

== Education ==
The city contains the Benxi Campus of the Liaoning University of Traditional Chinese Medicine (LNUTCM).

the Benxi Senior High School (Benxi Gaozhong) is located in the city, which faced controversy about the number of sporting students.

== Tourist activities ==
The eastern side of Benxi has mountains, caves and lakes with low population, making the various parks in that area popular.

The Benxi Lake, located at the urban area of Xihu district in Benxi, after which the city was named in Qing dynasty, has been described as the smallest lake in the world. With an area less than 15 sq. meters and a daily rate of flow at approximately 20,000 tons, the lake acts as a tourist attraction.

The Benxi Water Cave National Park is a subterranean river, some 3,000 meters long, 2 meters deep and wide enough for 20-30 boats. It flows through this cave situated 35 km (22 mi) east of Benxi city. The cave has stalactites and stone flowers, pillars and curtains.

Wunü Mountain National Park contains the remains of an ancient Goguryeo capital city. As such the site has been recognised as a UNESCO World Heritage Site.

Guanmenshan National Forest Park is a valley with trails. The area is particularly popular in autumn when the leaves of the maple trees that line the valley turn bright red.

== Pictures ==
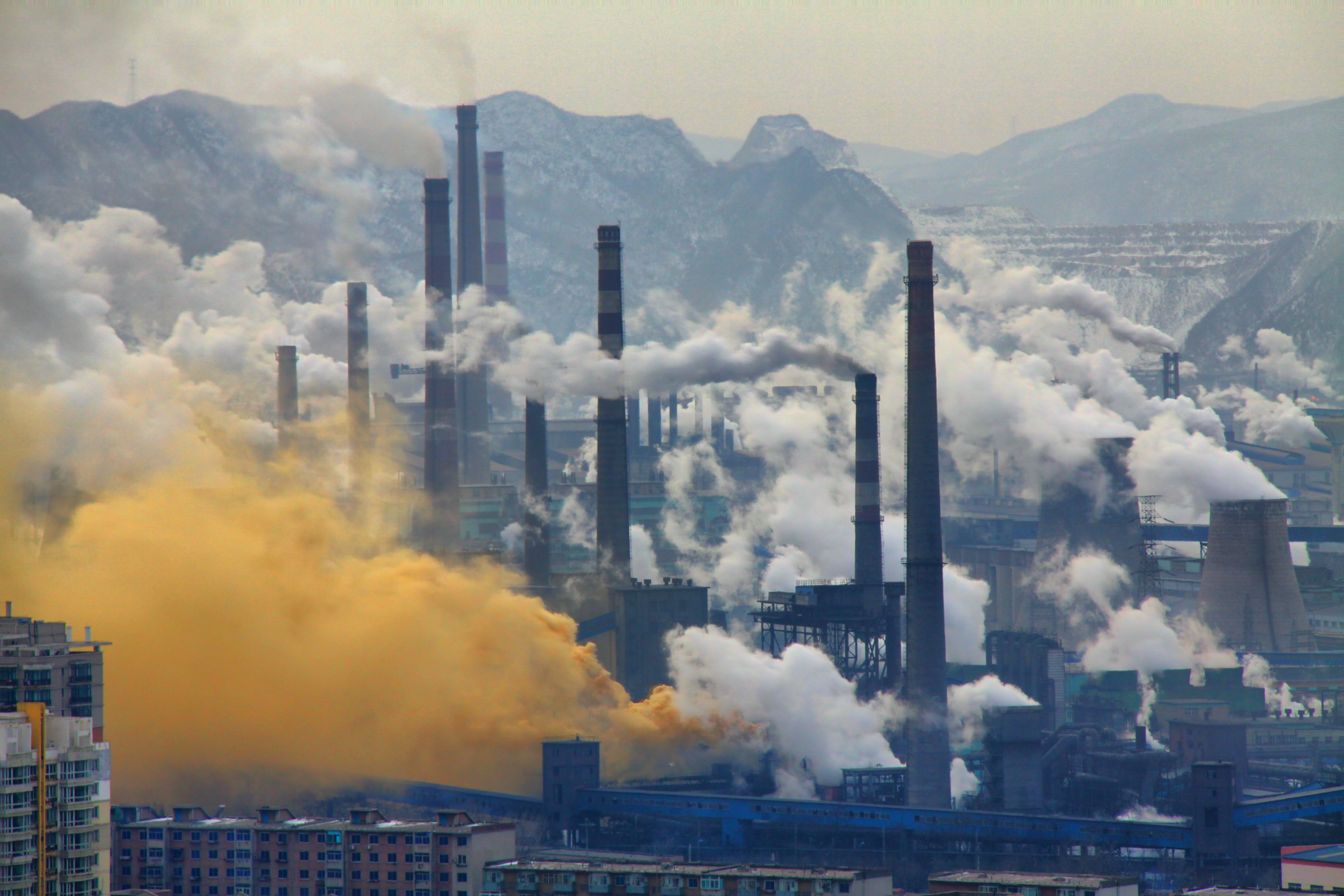
Steel industry Feb 2013

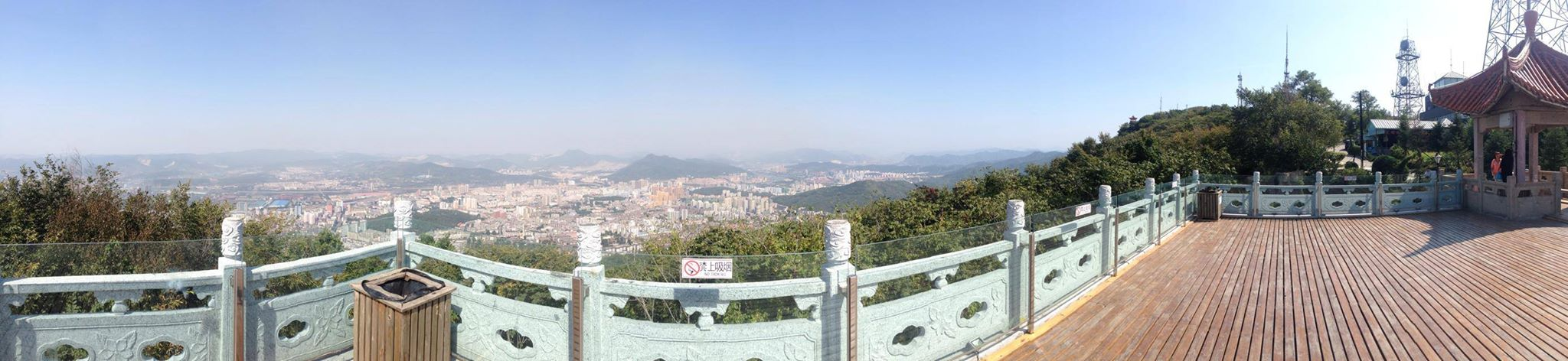
View from the top of Pingdingshan

== Sister cities ==
- Peoria, Illinois, United States
- Brampton, Ontario, Canada
- Modena, Italy
