= Sankeng =

Sankeng may refer to:

- Sankeng (slang), a Chinese subculture fashion slang
- Sankeng railway station, a railway station on the Taiwan Railways Administration West Coast line
- Sankeng Town (三坑镇), Qingxin, Qingyuan, Guangdong Province, China
- Sankeng Village (三坑村), Baishe, Jiangxi, China
- Sankeng Village (三坑村), Shizhong, Xinluo, Longyan, Fujian Province, China
- Sankeng Village (三坑村), Xiaosheng, Guangdong, China
- Sankeng Village (三坑里), Longtan District, Taoyuan, Taiwan
