= Dalonghua =

Dalonghua (大龙华) may refer to these places in China:

- Dalonghua, Guangdong, a town in Fengshun County, Guangdong
- Dalonghua Township, a township in Yi County, Hebei
