= Nantang =

Nantang may refer to:

- Southern Tang (南唐), a 10th-century Chinese state during the Five Dynasties and Ten Kingdoms period
- Nantang, Lufeng, Guangdong (南塘) in China
- Nantang, Gaozhou (南塘) also in Guangdong, China
- Cathedral of the Immaculate Conception, Beijing, or Nantang (南堂), a Roman Catholic church in Beijing, China
- Na'vi term for viperwolf in Avatar
