= Jiangwan =

Jiangwan (usually, Chinese: 江弯, literally "river bend") is a common place name in China:

== Township-level units ==
- Jiangwan, Harbin, town in Yilan County
- Jiangwan, Guangdong, town in Wujiang District, Shaoguan
- Jiangwan, Jiangxi, town in Wuyuan County (zh:江湾镇 (婺源县))
- Jiangwan Township, Dorbod Mongol Autonomous County, Heilongjiang
- Jiangwanzhen Subdistrict, a.k.a. Jiangwan Town Subdistrict (zh:江湾镇街道), formerly (until 2006) Jiangwan Town, in Shanghai

== Transportation ==
- Jiangwan Airport, former airport in Shanghai
- Jiangwan Town Station in Shanghai Metro
- Jiangwan Stadium Metro Station in Shanghai Metro
- Jiangwan Bridge, in Guangzhou, Guangdong

== Other ==
- Riverside Sports Center, also known as Shanghai Jiangwan Sports Center, in Shanghai

== Not to be confused with ==
- Jiangwang Subdistrict (蒋王街道), in Yangzhou City, Jiangsu
