= Huilong, Shaoguan =

Huilong 回龙镇
- Town
- Location in Guangdong
- Coordinates: 24°09′19″N 113°55′13″E
- Country: People's Republic of China
- Province: Guangdong
- Prefecture-level city: Shaoguan
- County: Xinfeng
- Village-level divisions: 1 residential community 17 villages
- Elevation: 143 m (469 ft)
- Time zone: UTC+8 (China Standard)
- Area code: 0751

Huilong (simplified Chinese: 回龙; traditional Chinese: 回龍; pinyin: Huílóng) is a town of Xinfeng County in northern Guangdong province, China, situated 31 kilometres (19 mi) northwest of the county seat. As of 2011, it has one residential community (社区) and 17 villages under its administration.

== See also ==
- List of township-level divisions of Guangdong
