= Tangxi =

Tangxi may refer to the following places in China:

== Anhui ==
- Tangxi, Chizhou (棠溪), a town in Chizhou
- Tangxi Subdistrict (塘西街道), a subdistrict in Jinjiazhuang District, Ma'anshan

== Guangdong ==
- Tangxi, Fengshun County (汤西), a town in Fengshun County
- Tangxi, Raoping County (汤溪), a town in Raoping County

== Hunan ==
- Tangxi Township (塘溪乡), a township in Chenzhou
- Tangxi, Zixing (汤溪), a town in Zixing

== Zhejiang ==
- Tangxi, Hangzhou (塘栖), a town in Hangzhou
- Tangxi, Ningbo (塘溪), a town in Ningbo
- Tangxi, Jinhua (汤溪), a town in Jinhua
