= Jianqiao =

Jianqiao may refer to:

- Jianqiao, Fengshun County, a town in Fengshun County, Guangdong, China
- Jianqiao Airport, an airport in Hangzhou, Zhejiang, China
