= List of township-level divisions of Guangdong =

Location of Guangdong province in China

This is a list of township-level divisions of the province of Guangdong, People's Republic of China (PRC). After province, prefecture, and county-level divisions, township-level divisions constitute the formal fourth-level administrative divisions of the PRC. As of the end of 2010, there are a total of 1,581 such divisions in Guangdong, divided into 436 subdistricts, 1,134 towns, 4 townships, and 7 ethnic townships. This list is divided first into the prefecture-level divisions then the county-level divisions.

== Guangzhou ==
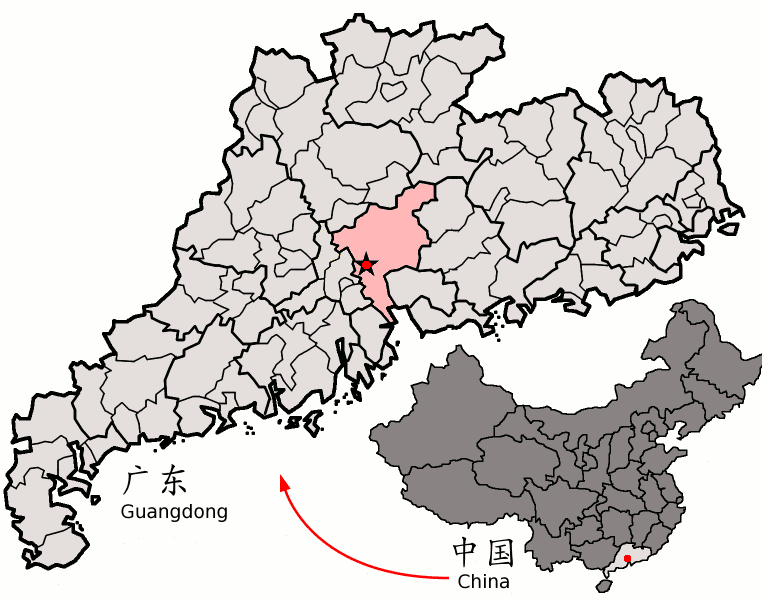
Location of Guangzhou (urban area in pink, rest of administrative area in yellow) in the province

=== Baiyun District ===
Subdistricts

- Jingtai Subdistrict (景泰街道), Songzhou Subdistrict (松洲街道), Tongde Subdistrict (同德街道), Huangshi Subdistrict (黄石街道), Tangjing Subdistrict (棠景街道), Xinshi Subdistrict (新市街道), Sanyuanli Subdistrict (三元里街道), Tonghe Subdistrict (同和街道), Jingxi Subdistrict (京溪街道), Yongping Subdistrict (永平街道), Junhe Subdistrict (均禾街道), Jinsha Subdistrict (金沙街道), Shijing Subdistrict (石井街道), Jiahe Subdistrict (嘉禾街道)

Towns

- Renhe (人和镇), Taihe (太和镇), Jianggao (江高镇), Zhongluotan (钟落潭镇)

=== Haizhu District ===
Subdistricts

- Haichuang Subdistrict (海幢街道), Chigang Subdistrict (赤岗街道), Xingang Subdistrict (新港街道), Binjiang Subdistrict (滨江街道), Sushe Subdistrict (素社街道), Nanhuaxi Subdistrict (南华西街道), Longfeng Subdistrict (龙凤街道), Shayuan Subdistrict (沙园街道), Ruibao Subdistrict (瑞宝街道), Jianghai Subdistrict (江海街道), Fengyang Subdistrict (凤阳街道), Nanshitou Subdistrict (南石头街道), Huazhou Subdistrict (华洲街道), Changgang Subdistrict (昌岗街道), Nanzhou Subdistrict (南洲街道), Pazhou Subdistrict (琶洲街道), Guanzhou Subdistrict (官洲街道), Jiangnanzhong Subdistrict (江南中街道)

=== Huadu District ===
The only subdistrict is Xinhua Subdistrict (新华街道)

Towns

- Timian (梯面镇), Huashan (花山镇), Tanbu (炭步镇), Chini (赤坭镇), Shiling (狮岭镇), Huadong (花东镇), Yayao (雅瑶镇)

=== Huangpu District ===
Subdistricts

- Dasha Subdistrict (大沙街道), Huangpu Subdistrict (黄埔街道), Hongshan Subdistrict (红山街道), Yuzhu Subdistrict (鱼珠街道), Wenchong Subdistrict (文冲街道), Nangang Subdistrict (南岗街道), Zhangzhou Subdistrict (长洲街道), Suidong Subdistrict (穗东街道), Lilian Subdistrict (荔联街道)

=== Liwan District ===
Subdistricts

- Jinhua Subdistrict (金花街道), Shamian Subdistrict (沙面街道), Hualin Subdistrict (华林街道), Duobao Subdistrict (多宝街道), Changhua Subdistrict (昌华街道), Fengyuan Subdistrict (逢源街道), Longjin Subdistrict (龙津街道), Caihong Subdistrict (彩虹街道), Nanyuan Subdistrict (南源街道), Xicun Subdistrict (西村街道), Zhanqian Subdistrict (站前街道), Lingnan Subdistrict (岭南街道), Qiaozhong Subdistrict (桥中街道), Chongkou Subdistrict (冲口街道), Huadi Subdistrict (花地街道), Chajiao Subdistrict (茶滘街道), Hailong Subdistrict (海龙街道), Zhongnan Subdistrict (中南街道), Dongjiao Subdistrict (东漖街道), Dongsha Subdistrict (东沙街道), Baihedong Subdistrict (白鹤洞街道), Shiweitang Subdistrict (石围塘街道)

=== Luogang District ===
Subdistricts

- Luogang Subdistrict (萝岗街道), Xiagang Subdistrict (夏港街道), Dongqu Subdistrict (东区街道), Lianhe Subdistrict (联和街道), Yonghe Subdistrict (永和街道)

The only town is Jiulong (九龙镇)

=== Nansha District ===
Subdistricts

- Nansha Subdistrict (南沙街道), Zhujiang Subdistrict (珠江街道)

Towns

- Huangge (黄阁镇), Wanqingsha (万顷沙镇), Hengli (横沥镇)

=== Panyu District ===
Subdistricts

- Shiqiao Subdistrict (市桥街道), Shawan Subdistrict (沙湾街道), Zhongcun Subdistrict (钟村街道), Shibi Subdistrict (石壁街道), Dashi Subdistrict (大石街道), Luopu Subdistrict (洛浦街道), Dalong Subdistrict (大龙街道), Donghuan Subdistrict (东环街道), Qiaonan Subdistrict (桥南街道), Shatou Subdistrict (沙头街道), Xiaoguwei Subdistrict (小谷围街道)

Towns

- Nancun (南村镇), Xinzao (新造镇), Hualong (化龙镇), Shilou (石楼镇), Dongyong (东涌镇), Dagang (大岗镇), Lanhe (榄核镇), Shiqi (石碁镇)

=== Tianhe District ===
Subdistricts

- Tianyuan Subdistrict (天园街道), Wushan Subdistrict, Guangzhou (五山街道), Yuancun Subdistrict (员村街道), Chebei Subdistrict (车陂街道), Shahe Subdistrict (沙河街道), Shipai Subdistrict (石牌街道), Xinghua Subdistrict (兴华街道), Shadong Subdistrict (沙东街道), Linhe Subdistrict (林和街道), Tangxia Subdistrict (棠下街道), Liede Subdistrict (猎德街道), Xiancun Subdistrict (冼村街道), Yuangang Subdistrict (元岗街道), Tianhenan Subdistrict (天河南街道), Huangcun Subdistrict (黄村街道), Longdong Subdistrict (龙洞街道), Changxing Subdistrict (长兴街道), Fenghuang Subdistrict (凤凰街道), Qianjin Subdistrict (前进街道), Zhuji Subdistrict (珠吉街道), Xintang Subdistrict (新塘街道)

=== Yuexiu District ===
Subdistricts

- Hongqiao Subdistrict (洪桥街道), Guangwei Subdistrict (广卫街道), Beijing Subdistrict (北京街道), Liurong Subdistrict (六榕街道), Liuhua Subdistrict (流花街道), Dongfeng Subdistrict (东风街道), Guangta Subdistrict (光塔街道), Shishu Subdistrict (诗书街道), Daxin Subdistrict (大新街道), Renmin Subdistrict (人民街道), Dongshan Subdistrict (东山街道), Nonglin Subdistrict (农林街道), Meihuacun Subdistrict (梅花村街道), Huanghuagang Subdistrict (黄花岗街道), Huale Subdistrict (华乐街道), Jianshe Subdistrict (建设街道), Datang Subdistrict (大塘街道), Zhuguang Subdistrict (珠光街道), Dadong Subdistrict (大东街道), Baiyun Subdistrict (白云街道), Dengfeng Subdistrict (登峰街道), Kuangquan Subdistrict (矿泉街道)

=== Conghua ===
Subdistricts

- Jiekou Subdistrict (街口街道), Chengjiao Subdistrict (城郊街道), Jiangbu Subdistrict (江埔街道)

Towns

- Wenquan (温泉镇), Liangkou (良口镇), Lütian (吕田镇), Taiping (太平镇), Aotou (鳌头镇)

=== Zengcheng ===
Subdistricts

- Licheng Subdistrict (荔城街道), Zengjiang Subdistrict (增江街道), Zhucun Subdistrict (朱村街道)

Towns

- Zhengguo (正果镇), Shitan (石滩镇), Xintang (新塘镇), Zhongxin (中新镇), Paitan (派潭镇), Xiaolou (小楼镇)

== Shenzhen ==
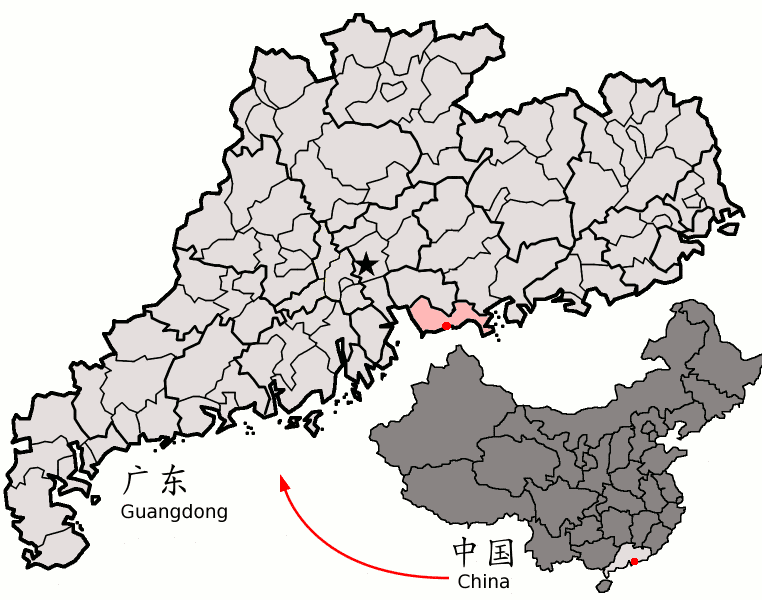
Location of Shenzhen in the province

=== Bao'an District ===
Subdistricts

- Xin'an Subdistrict (新安街道), Shiyan Subdistrict (石岩街道), Xixiang Subdistrict (西乡街道), Fuyong Subdistrict (福永街道), Shajing Subdistrict (沙井街道), Songgang Subdistrict (松岗街道)

=== Futian District ===
Subdistricts

- Shatou Subdistrict (沙头街道), Nanyuan Subdistrict (南园街道), Yuanling Subdistrict (园岭街道), Huafu Subdistrict (华富街道), Futian Subdistrict (福田街道), Xiangmihu Subdistrict (香蜜湖街道), Lianhua Subdistrict (莲花街道), Meilin Subdistrict (梅林街道), Huaqiangbei Subdistrict (华强北街道), Fubao Subdistrict (福保街道)

=== Luohu District ===
Subdistricts

- Huangbei Subdistrict (黄贝街道), Guiyuan Subdistrict (桂园街道), Dongmen Subdistrict (东门街道), Cuizhu Subdistrict (翠竹街道), Dongxiao Subdistrict (东晓街道), Nanhu Subdistrict (南湖街道), Sungang Subdistrict (笋岗街道), Donghu Subdistrict (东湖街道), Liantang Subdistrict (莲塘街道), Qingshuihe Subdistrict (清水河街道)

=== Longgang District ===
Subdistricts

- Longcheng Subdistrict (龙城街道), Longgang Subdistrict (龙岗街道), Henggang Subdistrict (横岗街道), Buji Subdistrict (布吉街道), Bantian Subdistrict (坂田街道), Nanwan Subdistrict (南湾街道), Pinghu Subdistrict (平湖街道), Pingdi Subdistrict (坪地街道)

=== Nanshan District ===
Subdistricts

- Nantou Subdistrict (南头街道), Nanshan Subdistrict (南山街道), Shahe Subdistrict (沙河街道), Xili Subdistrict (西丽街道), Shekou Subdistrict (蛇口街道), Zhaoshang Subdistrict (招商街道), Yuehai Subdistrict (粤海街道), Taoyuan Subdistrict (桃源街道)

=== Yantian District ===
Subdistricts

- Haishan Subdistrict (海山街道), Yantian Subdistrict (盐田街道), Meisha Subdistrict (梅沙街道), Shatoujiao Subdistrict (沙头角街道)

=== Pingshan District ===
Subdistricts

- Pingshan Subdistrict (坪山街道), Kengzi Subdistrict (坑梓街道)

=== Longhua District ===
Subdistricts Guanhu Subdistrict (观湖街道), *Longhua Subdistrict (龙华街道), Minzhi Subdistrict (民治街道), Dalang Subdistrict (大浪街道), Guanlan Subdistrict (观澜街道), Fucheng Subdistrict (福城街道)

=== Guangming New District (New Area) ===
Subdistricts

- Guangming Subdistrict (光明街道), Gongming Subdistrict (公明街道)

=== Dapeng New District (New Area) ===
Subdistricts

- Dapeng Subdistrict (大鹏街道), Kuichong Subdistrict (葵涌街道), Nan'ao Subdistrict (南澳街道)

== Chaozhou ==
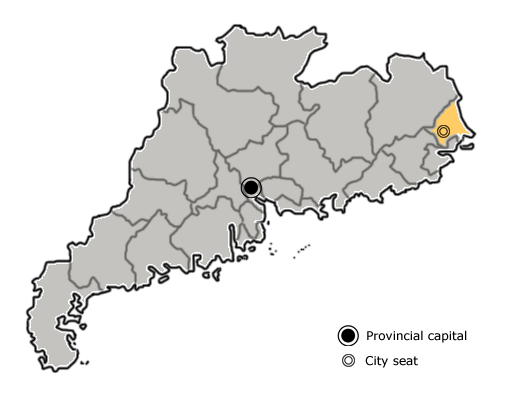
Location of Chaozhou in the province

=== Xiangqiao District ===
Subdistricts

- Fengxin Subdistrict (凤新街道), Xiangqiao Subdistrict (湘桥街道), Xihu Subdistrict (西湖街道), Jinshan Subdistrict (金山街道), Taiping Subdistrict (太平街道), Nanchun Subdistrict (南春街道), Xixin Subdistrict (西新街道), Qiaodong Subdistrict (桥东街道), Chengxi Subdistrict (城西街道)

The only town is Yixi (意溪镇)

=== Chao'an District ===
Towns

- Anbu (庵埠镇), Wenci (文祠镇), Fenghuang (凤凰镇), Tiepu (铁铺镇), Linxi (磷溪镇), Guantang (官塘镇), Jiangdong (江东镇), Dongfeng (东凤镇), Longhu (龙湖镇), Guihu (归湖镇), Caitang (彩塘镇), Jinshi (金石镇), Fuyang (浮洋镇), Shaxi (沙溪镇), Fengtang (凤塘镇), Guxiang (古巷镇), Dengtang (登塘镇), Chifeng (赤凤镇), Fengxi (枫溪镇)

=== Raoping County ===
Towns

- Huanggang (黄冈镇), Dacheng (大埕镇), Suocheng (所城镇), Zhelin (柘林镇), Haishan (海山镇), Jingzhou (汫洲镇), Qiandong (钱东镇), Zhangxi (樟溪镇), Fushan (浮山镇), Tangxi (汤溪镇), Sanrao (三饶镇), Lianrao (联饶镇), Xinxu (新圩镇), Xinfeng (新丰镇), Raoyang (饶洋镇), Shangrao (上饶镇), Jianrao (建饶镇), Gaotang (高堂镇), Fubin (浮滨镇), Xintang (新塘镇), Dongshan (东山镇)

== Dongguan ==
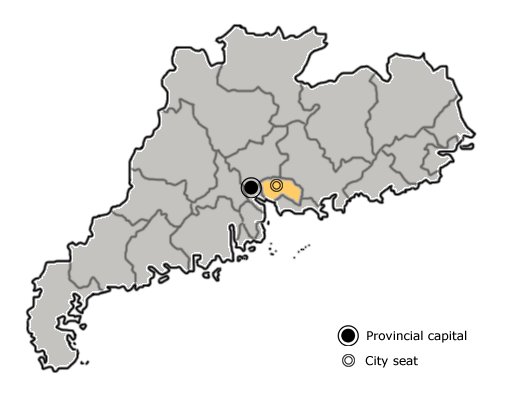
Location of Dongguan in the province

Note: County-level divisions are absent in Dongguan, so the township-level divisions form the third-level administrative unit.

Subdistricts

- Guancheng Subdistrict (莞城街道), Dongcheng Subdistrict (东城街道), Wanjiang Subdistrict (万江街道), Nancheng Subdistrict (南城街道)

Towns

- Machong (麻涌镇), Shilong (石龙镇), Humen (虎门镇), Daojiao (道滘镇), Shijie (石碣镇), Hongmei (洪梅镇), Liaobu (寮步镇), Dalingshan (大岭山镇), Dalang (大朗镇), Huangjiang (黄江镇), Zhangmutou (樟木头镇), Fenggang (凤岗镇), Tangxia (塘厦镇), Qingxi (清溪镇), Changping (常平镇), Qiaotou (桥头镇), Hengli (横沥镇), Dongkeng (东坑镇), Qishi (企石镇), Shipai (石排镇), Chashan (茶山镇), Chang'an (长安镇), Gaobu (高埗镇), Shatian (沙田镇), Wangniudun (望牛墩镇), Xiegang (谢岗镇), Zhongtang (中堂镇), Houjie (厚街镇)

== Foshan ==
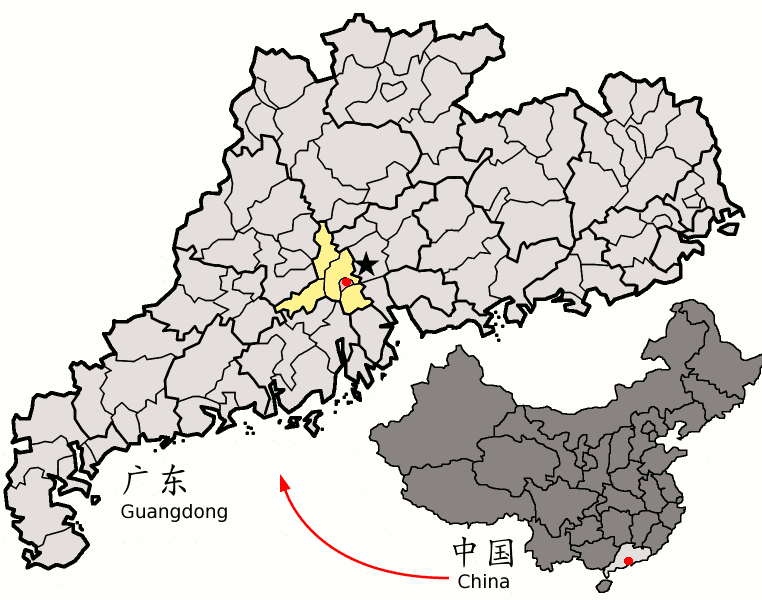
Location of Foshan in the province

=== Chancheng District ===
Subdistricts

- Zumiao Subdistrict (祖庙街道), Shiwanzhen Subdistrict (石湾镇街道), Zhangcha Subdistrict (张槎街道)

The only town is Nanzhuang (南庄镇)

=== Nanhai District ===
Subdistricts

- Guicheng Subdistrict (桂城街道), Luocun Subdistrict (罗村街道)

Towns

- Lishui (里水镇), Jiujiang (九江镇), Danzao (丹灶镇), Dali (大沥镇), Shishan (狮山镇), Xiqiao (西樵镇)

=== Shunde District ===
Subdistricts

- Daliang Subdistrict (大良街道), Ronggui Subdistrict (容桂街道), Leliu Subdistrict (勒流街道), Lunjiao Subdistrict (伦教街道)

Towns

- Beijiao (北滘镇), Lecong (乐从镇), Jun'an (均安镇), Xingtan (杏坛镇), Chencun (陈村镇), Longjiang (龙江镇)

=== Sanshui District ===
Subdistricts

- Xinan Subdistrict (西南街道), Yundonghai Subdistrict (云东海街道)

Towns

- Lubao (芦苞镇), Datang (大塘镇), Leping (乐平镇), Baini (白坭镇), Nanshan (南山镇)

=== Gaoming District ===
The only subdistrict is Hecheng Subdistrict (荷城街道)

Towns

- Yanghe (杨和镇), Genghe (更合镇), Mingcheng (明城镇)

== Heyuan ==
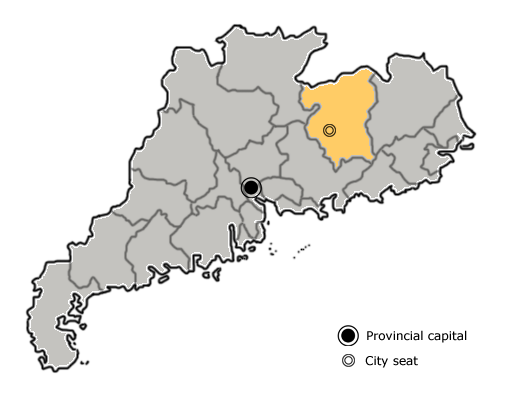
Location of Heyuan in the province

=== Yuancheng District ===
Subdistricts

- Shangcheng Subdistrict (上城街道), Dongpu Subdistrict (东埔街道), Xinjiang Subdistrict (新江街道), Yuanxi Subdistrict (源西街道)

Towns

- Yuannan (源南镇), Buqian (埔前镇)

=== Dongyuan County ===
Towns

- Xiantang (仙塘镇), Dengta (灯塔镇), Luohu (骆湖镇), Chuangtang (船塘镇), Shuntian (顺天镇), Shangguan (上莞镇), Zengtian (曾田镇), Liucheng (柳城镇), Yihe (义合镇), Lankou (蓝口镇), Huangtian (黄田镇), Yetan (叶潭镇), Huangcun (黄村镇), Kanghe (康禾镇), Xichang (锡场镇), Xingang (新港镇), Shuangjiang (双江镇), Jiantou (涧头镇), Banjiang (半江镇), Xinhuilong (新回龙镇)

The only township is Zhangxi She Ethnic Township (漳溪畲族乡)

=== Heping County ===
Towns

- Yangming (阳明镇), Pengzhai (彭寨镇), Dongshui (东水镇), Linzhai (林寨镇), Renshui (热水镇), Daba (大坝镇), Shangling (上陵镇), Xiache (下车镇), Zhangtang (长塘镇), Beidun (贝墩镇), Guzhai (古寨镇), Lishi (礼士镇), Gongbai (公白镇), Heshui (合水镇), Qingzhou (青州镇), Liyuan (浰源镇), Yousheng (优胜镇)

=== Lianping County ===
Towns

- Yuanshan (元善镇), Shangping (上坪镇), Dahu (大湖镇), Zhongxin (忠信镇), Longjie (隆街镇), Beitou (陂头镇), Neiguan (内莞镇), Xiuduan (绣缎镇), Gaoguan (高莞镇), Youxi (油溪镇), Tianyuan (田源镇), Xishan (溪山镇), Sanjiao (三角镇)

=== Longchuan County ===
Towns

- Laolong (老隆镇), Sidu (四都镇), Huangshi (黄石镇), Xi'ao (细坳镇), Chetian (车田镇), Beiling (贝岭镇), Liju (黎咀镇), Shangping (上坪镇), Fengren (丰稔镇), Chiguang (赤光镇), Longmu (龙母镇), Huilong (回龙镇), Tianxin (田心镇), Tiechang (铁场镇), Dengyun (登云镇), Tongqu (通衢镇), Heshi (鹤市镇), Huangbu (黄布镇), Zishi (紫市镇), Tuocheng (佗城镇), Yanzhen (岩镇镇), Xintian (新田镇), Yidu (义都镇), Mabugang (麻布岗镇)

=== Zijin County ===
Towns

- Zicheng (紫城镇), Zhongba (中坝镇), Longwo (龙窝镇), Jiuwo (九和镇), Shangyi (上义镇), Lantang (蓝塘镇), Feng'an (凤安镇), Yirong (义容镇), Guzhu (古竹镇), Linjiang (临江镇), Baibu (柏埔镇), Huangtang (黄塘镇), Jingzi (敬梓镇), Shuidun (水墩镇), Nanling (南岭镇), Suqu (苏区镇), Waxi (瓦溪镇), Haoyi (好义镇)

== Huizhou ==
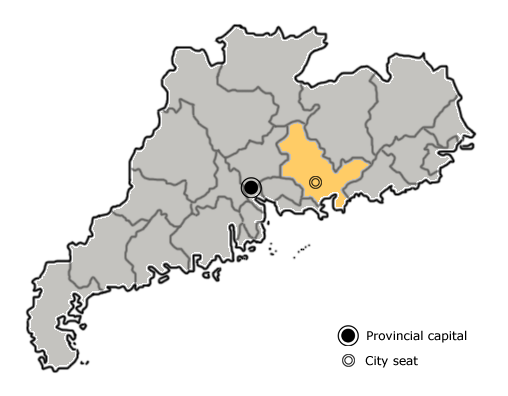
Location of Huizhou in the province

=== Huicheng District ===
Subdistricts

- Qiaodong (桥东街道) Qiaoxi (桥西街道) Jiangnan (江南街道) Jiangbei (江北街道) Longfeng (龙丰街道) Henan (河南岸街道) Huihuan (惠环街道) Chenjiang (陈江街道) Shuikou (水口街道) Xiaojinkou (小金口街道)

Towns

- Ruhu (汝湖镇) Sandong (三栋镇) Tonghu (潼湖镇) Lilin (沥林镇) Ma'an (马安镇) Hengli (横沥镇) Luzhou (芦洲镇) Tongqiao (潼侨镇)

=== Huiyang District ===
Subdistricts

- Danshui Subdistrict (淡水街道), Qiuchang Subdistrict (秋长街道), Aotou Subdistrict (澳头街道), Xiayong Subdistrict (霞涌街道)

Towns

- Yonghu (永湖镇), Liangjing (良井镇), Pingtan (平潭镇), Shatian (沙田镇), Xinxu (新圩镇), Zhenlong (镇隆镇)

=== Boluo County ===
Towns

- Luoyang (罗阳镇), Gongzhuang (公庄镇), Baitang (柏塘镇), Yangcun (杨村镇), Mabei (麻陂镇), Shiba (石坝镇), Taimei (泰美镇), Longxi (龙溪镇), Yuanzhou (园洲镇), Shiwan (石湾镇), Longhua (龙华镇), Futian (福田镇), Changning (长宁镇), Huzhen (湖镇镇), Yangqiao (杨侨镇), Guanyinge (观音阁镇), Henghe (横河镇)

=== Huidong County ===
The only subdistrict is Pingshan Subdistrict (平山街道)

Towns

- Daling (大岭镇), Andun (安墩镇), Baokou (宝口镇), Gaotan (高潭镇), Duozhu (多祝镇), Jilong (吉隆镇), Renshan (稔山镇), Tieyong (铁涌镇), Pinghai (平海镇), Baihua (白花镇), Lianghua (梁化镇), Huangbu (黄埠镇), Baipenzhu (白盆珠镇)

=== Longmen County ===
The only subdistrict is Longcheng Subdistrict (龙城街道)

Towns

- Longtian (龙田镇), Pingling (平陵镇), Longjiang (龙江镇), Longhua (龙华镇), Mazha (麻榨镇), Yonghan (永汉镇), Longtan (龙潭镇), Dipai (地派镇)

The only township is Lantian Yao Ethnic Township (蓝天瑶族乡)

== Jiangmen ==
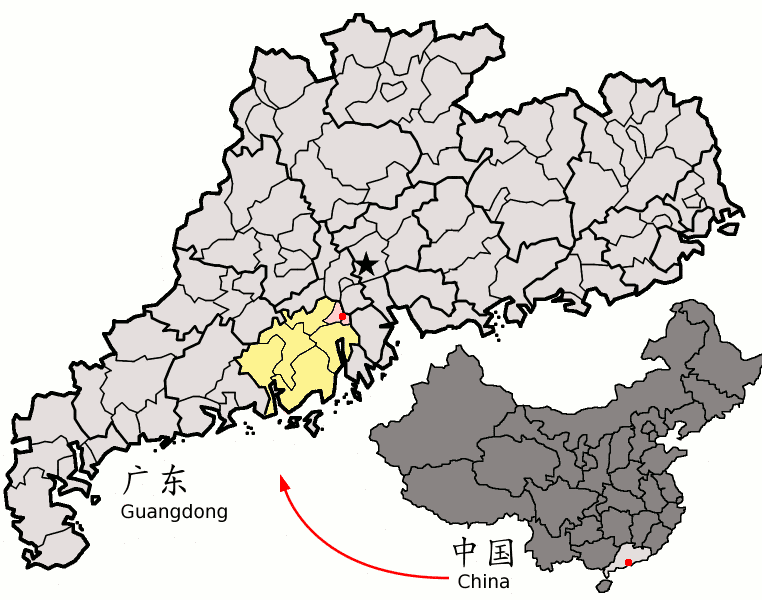
Location of Jiangmen in the province

=== Jianghai District ===
Subdistricts

- Jiaotou Subdistrict (滘头街道), Jiangnan Subdistrict (江南街道), Jiaobei Subdistrict (滘北街道), Waihai Subdistrict (外海街道), Lile Subdistrict (礼乐街道)

=== Pengjiang District ===
Subdistricts

- Huanshi Subdistrict (环市街道), Canghou Subdistrict (仓后街道), Didong Subdistrict (堤东街道), Beijie Subdistrict (北街街道), Baisha Subdistrict (白沙街道), Chaolian Subdistrict (潮连街道)

Towns

- Tangxia (棠下镇), Hetang (荷塘镇), Duruan (杜阮镇)

=== Xinhui District ===
The only subdistrict is Huicheng Subdistrict (会城街道)

Towns

- Daze (大泽镇), Siqian (司前镇), Luokeng (罗坑镇), Shuangshui (双水镇), Yamen (崖门镇), Shadui (沙堆镇), Gujing (古井镇), Sanjiang (三江镇), Muzhou (睦洲镇), Da'ao (大鳌镇)

=== Enping ===
The only subdistrict is Encheng Subdistrict (恩城街道)

Towns

- Liangxi (良西镇), Niujiang (牛江镇), Shengtang (圣堂镇), Shahu (沙湖镇), Dongcheng (东成镇), Juntang (君堂镇), Hengbei (横陂镇), Dahuai (大槐镇), Naji (那吉镇), Datian (大田镇)

=== Heshan ===
The only subdistrict is Shaping Subdistrict (沙坪街道)

Towns

- Yayao (雅瑶镇), Gonghe (共和镇), Taoyuan (桃源镇), Zhishan (址山镇), Yunxiang (云乡镇), Hecheng (鹤城镇), Zhaiwu (宅梧镇), Shuanghe (双合镇), Longkou (龙口镇), Gulao (古劳镇)

=== Kaiping ===
Subdistricts

- Changsha Subdistrict (长沙街道), Sanbu Subdistrict (三埠街道)

Towns

- Yueshan (月山镇), Shuikou (水口镇), Chishui (赤水镇), Jinji (金鸡镇), Xiangang (蚬冈镇), Baihe (百合镇), Chikan (赤坎镇), Tangkou (塘口镇), Dasha (大沙镇), Magang (马冈镇), Longsheng (龙胜镇), Chacheng (苍城镇), Shatang (沙塘镇)

=== Taishan ===
The only subdistrict is Taicheng Subdistrict (台城街道)

Towns

- Dajiang (大江镇), Shuibu (水步镇), Sijiu (四九镇), Duhu (都斛镇), Chixi (赤溪镇), Chonglou (冲蒌镇), Doushan (斗山镇), Guanghai (广海镇), Chuandao (川岛镇), Duanfen (端芬镇), Haiyan (海宴镇), Wencun (汶村镇), Sanhe (三合镇), Beidou (北陡镇), Shenjing (深井镇), Baisha (白沙镇)

== Jieyang ==
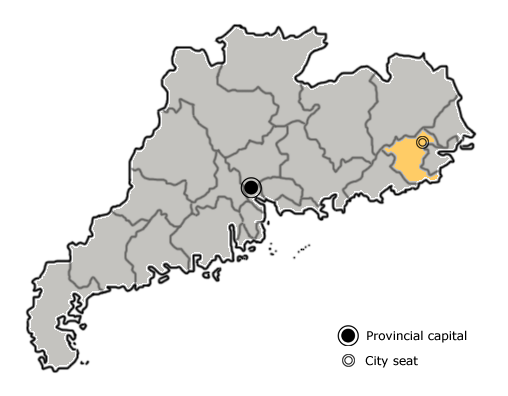
Location of Jieyang in the province

=== Rongcheng District ===
Subdistricts

- Xinxing Subdistrict (新兴街道), Ronghua Subdistrict (榕华街道), Zhongshan Subdistrict (中山街道), Xima Subdistrict (西马街道), Rongdong Subdistrict (榕东街道), Xianqiao Subdistrict (仙桥街道), Meiyun Subdistrict (梅云街道), Pandong Subdistrict (磐东街道), Dongshan Subdistrict (东山街道)

The only town is Yuhu (渔湖镇)

=== Puning ===
Subdistricts

- Liushabei Subdistrict (流沙北街道), Liushaxi Subdistrict (流沙西街道), Liushadong Subdistrict (流沙东街道), Liushanan Subdistrict (流沙南街道), Chiwei Subdistrict (池尾街道), Qiaoxin Subdistrict (侨新街道), Qiaodong Subdistrict (侨东街道)

Towns

- Chigang (赤岗镇), Daba (大坝镇), Hongyang (洪阳镇), Nanxi (南溪镇), Guangtai (广太镇), Qilin (麒麟镇), Nanjing (南径镇), Zhanlong (占陇镇), Junbu (军埠镇), Gaopu (高埔镇), Yunluo (云落镇), Daping (大坪镇), Chuanpu (船埔镇), Meilin (梅林镇), Lihu (里湖镇), Meitang (梅塘镇), Liaoyuan (燎原镇), Dananshan (大南山镇), Xiajiashan (下架山镇)

The only township is Houxi Subdistrict (鲘溪乡)

=== Huilai County ===
Towns

- Huicheng (惠城镇), Huahu (华湖镇), Xian'an (仙庵镇), Jinghai (靖海镇), Zhoutian (周田镇), Qianzhan (前詹镇), Shenquan (神泉镇), Donglong (东陇镇), Qishi (岐石镇), Longjiang (隆江镇), Xixi (溪西镇), Aojiang (鳌江镇), Donggang (东港镇), Kuitan (Kweitan) (葵潭镇)

=== Jiedong County ===
The only subdistrict is Quxi Subdistrict (曲溪街道)

Towns

- Yunlu (云路镇), Yujiao (玉窖镇), Denggang (登岗镇), Paotai (炮台镇), Didu (地都镇), Linpan (霖磐镇), Yuecheng (月城镇), Baita (白塔镇), Longwei (龙尾镇), Guiling (桂岭镇), Xichang (锡场镇), Xinxiang (新亨镇), Yuhu (玉湖镇), Putian (埔田镇)

=== Jiexi County ===
The only subdistrict is Hepo Subdistrict (河婆街道)

Towns

- Longtan (龙潭镇), Nanshan (南山镇), Huizhai (灰寨镇), Tatou (塔头镇), Dongyuan (东园镇 ), Fengjiang (凤江镇), Mianhu (棉湖镇), Jinhe (金和镇), Daxi (大溪镇), Qiankeng (钱坑镇), Pingshang (坪上镇), Wuyun (五云镇), Shangsha (上砂镇), Wujingfu (五经富镇), Jingxiyuan (京溪园镇)

The only township is Liangtian Township (良田乡)

== Maoming ==
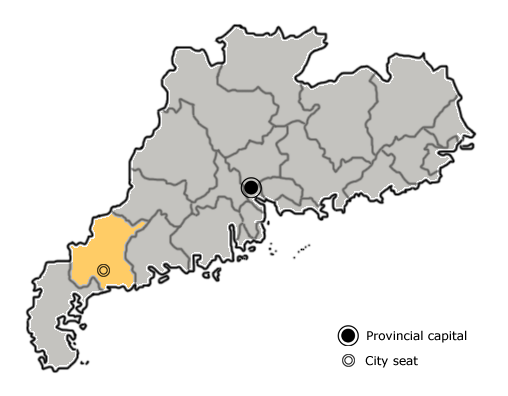
Location of Maoming in the province

=== Maogang District ===
Subdistricts

- Nanhai Subdistrict (南海街道), Gaodi Subdistrict (高地街道)

Towns

- Shayuan (沙院镇), Xiaoliang (小良镇), Qijing (七迳镇), Poxin (坡心镇), Yangjiao (羊角镇)

=== Maonan District ===
Subdistricts

- Zhanqian Subdistrict (站前街道), Chengnan Subdistrict (城南街道), Hongqi Subdistrict (红旗街道), Hexi Subdistrict (河西街道), Hedong Subdistrict (河东街道), Xinhua Subdistrict (新华街道), Guandu Subdistrict (官渡街道), Loutiankuang Subdistrict (露天矿街道)

Towns

- Gaoshan (高山镇), Jintang (金塘镇), Shange (山阁镇), Meihua (袂花镇), Xinpo (新坡镇), Aotou (鳌头镇), Zhensheng (镇盛镇), Gongguan (公馆镇)

=== Gaozhou ===
Subdistricts

- Panzhou Subdistrict (潘州街道), Shanmei Subdistrict (山美街道), Baoguang Subdistrict (宝光街道), Jinshan Subdistrict (金山街道), Shizailing Subdistrict (石仔岭街道)

Towns

- Tantou (潭头镇), Dajing (大井镇), Dong'an (东岸镇), Shenzhen (深镇镇), Caojiang (曹江镇), Changpo (长坡镇), Pingshan (平山镇), Guding (古丁镇), Magui (马贵镇), Dapo (大坡镇), Xieji (谢鸡镇), Xindong (新垌镇), Yuntan (云潭镇), Sishui (泗水镇), Genzi (根子镇), Hetang (荷塘镇), Fenjie (分界镇), Shigu (石鼓镇), Zhenjiang (镇江镇), Shatian (沙田镇), Shiban (石板镇), Hehua (荷花镇), Nantang (南塘镇)

=== Huazhou ===
Subdistricts

- Dongshan Subdistrict (东山街道), Jianjiang Subdistrict (鉴江街道), Hexi Subdistrict (河西街道), Xiaguo Subdistrict (下郭街道), Shiwan Subdistrict (石湾街道), Nansheng Subdistrict (南盛街道)

Towns

- Ligang (丽岗镇), Baowei (宝圩镇), Tongqing (同庆镇), Changqi (长岐镇), Yangmei (杨梅镇), Liangguang (良光镇), Daqiao (笪桥镇), Xin'an (新安镇), Guanqiao (官桥镇), Zhongdong (中垌镇), Pingding (平定镇), Wenlou (文楼镇), Linchen (林尘镇), Hejiang (合江镇), Jianghu (江湖镇), Nawu (那务镇), Boyang (播扬镇)

=== Xinyi ===
The only subdistrict is Dongzhen Subdistrict (东镇街道)

Towns

- Chidong (池洞镇), Zhusha (朱砂镇), Guizi (贵子镇), Huaixiang (怀乡镇), Hongguan (洪冠镇), Pingtang (平塘镇), Sihe (思贺镇), Baishi (白石镇), Qianfei (钱排镇), Xinbao (新宝镇), Heshui (合水镇), Dacheng (大成镇), Shuikou (水口镇), Zhenlong (镇隆镇), Beijie (北界镇), Jindong (金垌镇), Chashan (茶山镇), Dingbao (丁堡镇)

=== Dianbai County ===
Towns

- Shuidong (水东镇), Lintou (林头镇), Xiadong (霞洞镇), Huangling (黄岭镇), Nahuo (那霍镇), Shalang (沙琅镇), Luokeng (罗坑镇), Guanzhu (观珠镇), Wangfu (望夫镇), Mata (马踏镇), Lingmen (岭门镇), Magang (麻岗镇), Danchang (旦场镇), Shuzai (树仔镇), Diancheng (电城镇), Bohe (博贺镇)

== Meizhou ==
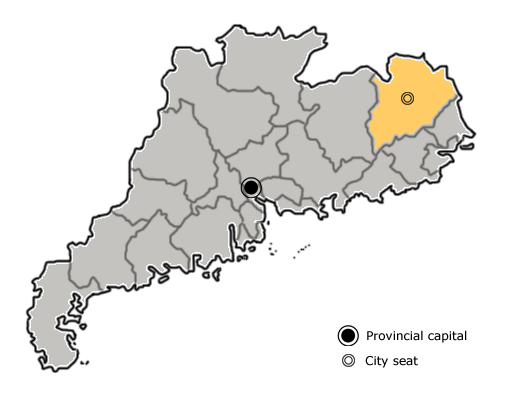
Location of Meizhou in the province

=== Meijiang District ===
Subdistricts

- Jinshan Subdistrict (金山街道), Jiangnan Subdistrict (江南街道), Xijiao Subdistrict (西郊街道)

Towns

- Changsha (长沙镇), Sanjiao (三角镇), Chengbei (城北镇)

=== Xingning ===
Subdistricts

- Xingtian (兴田街道), Fuxing (福兴街道), Ningxing (宁新街道)

Towns

- Daping (大坪镇), Diaofang (刁坊镇), Luofu (罗浮镇), Luogang (罗岗镇), Heshui (合水镇), Huangbei (黄陂镇), Huanghuai (黄槐镇), Jingnan (径南镇), Longtian (龙田镇), Nibei (坭陂镇), Ningzhong (宁中镇), Shima (石马镇), Shuikou (水口镇), Xinbei (新陂镇), Xinwei (新圩镇), Yetang (叶塘镇), Yonghe (永和镇)

=== Dabu County ===
Towns

- Huliao (湖寮镇), Chayang (茶阳镇), Xihe (西河镇), Baihou (百侯镇), Fenglang (枫朗镇), Guangde (光德镇), Taoyuan (桃源镇), Gaobei (高陂镇), Dama (大麻镇), Sanhe (三河镇), Dadong (大东镇), Zhourui (洲瑞镇), Yinjiang (银江镇), Qingxi (青溪镇)

=== Fengshun County ===
Towns

- Baxiangshan (八乡山镇) Beidou (北斗镇) Dalonghua (大龙华镇) Fengliang (丰良镇) Huangjin (黄金镇) Jianqiao (建桥镇) Liuhuang (留隍镇) Longgang (龙岗镇) Pantian (潘田镇) Puzhai (埔寨镇) Shatian (砂田镇) Tanjiang (潭江镇) Tangkeng (汤坑镇) Tangnan (汤南镇) Tangxi (汤西镇) Xiaosheng (小胜镇)

Township enterprise

- Puzhai Farm (埔寨农场)

=== Jiaoling County ===
Towns

- Jiaocheng (蕉城镇), Guangfu (广福镇), Wenfu (文福镇), Xinpu (新铺镇), Sanzhen (三圳镇), Nanca (南礤镇), Lanfang (蓝坊镇), Changtan (长潭镇)

=== Mei County ===
Towns

- Chengjiang (程江镇), Shishan (石扇镇), Chengdong (城东镇), Baidu (白渡镇), Songyuan (松源镇), Longwen (隆文镇), Taoyao (桃尧镇), Songkou (松口镇), Yanyang (雁洋镇), Bingcun (丙村镇), Xiyang (西阳镇), Meinan (梅南镇), Shuiche (水车镇), Shejiang (畲江镇), Nankou (南口镇), Shikeng (石坑镇), Daping (大坪镇), Meixi (梅西镇)

=== Pingyuan County ===
Towns

- Dazhe (大柘镇), Renju (仁居镇), Dongshi (东石镇), Shizheng (石正镇), Bachi (八尺镇), Chagan (差干镇), Shangju (上举镇), Sishui (泗水镇), Changtian (长田镇), Rezhe (热柘镇), Zhongxing (中行镇), Hetou (河头镇)

=== Wuhua County ===
Towns

- Shuizhai (水寨镇), Hedong (河东镇), Guotian (郭田镇), Shuanghua (双华镇), Mianyang (棉洋镇), Anliu (安流镇), Meilin (梅林镇), Longcun (龙村镇), Hengbei (横陂镇), Huayang (华阳镇), Zhoujiang (周江镇), Changbu (长布镇), Tanxia (潭下镇), Qiling (岐岭镇), Zhuanshui (转水镇), Huacheng (华城镇)

== Qingyuan ==
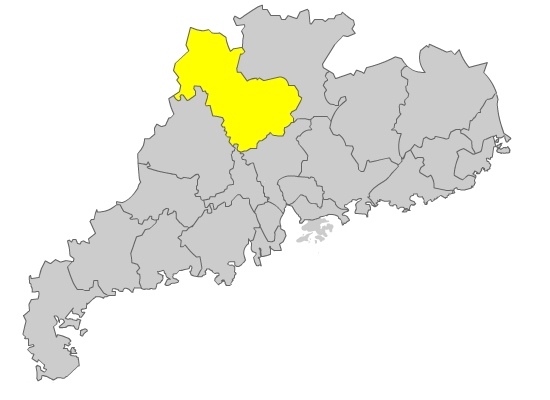
Location of Qingyuan in the province

=== Qingcheng District ===
Subdistricts

- Dongcheng Subdistrict (东城街道), Fengcheng Subdistrict (凤城街道), Zhouxin Subdistrict (洲心街道), Henghe Subdistrict (横荷街道)

Towns

- Yuantan (源潭镇), Longtang (龙塘镇), Shijiao (石角镇), Feilaixia (飞来峡镇)

=== Qingxin District ===
Towns

- Taihe (太和镇), Shantang (山塘镇), Sankeng (三坑镇), Taiping (太平镇), Longjing (龙颈镇), Heyun (禾云镇), Jintan (浸潭镇), Shitan (石潭镇)

=== Lianzhou ===
Towns

- Lianzhou (连州镇), Bao'an (保安镇), Xingzi (星子镇), Longping (龙坪镇), Xi'an (西岸镇), Dongbei (东陂镇), Fengyang (丰阳镇), Xijiang (西江镇), Jiubei (九陂镇), Dalubian (大路边镇)

Townships

- Yao'an Yao Ethnic Township (瑶安瑶族乡), Sanshui Yao Ethnic Township (三水瑶族乡)

=== Yingde ===
The only subdistrict is Yingcheng Subdistrict (英城街道)

Towns

- Shakou (沙口镇), Wangbu (望埠镇), Qiaotou (桥头镇), Qingtang (青塘镇), Donghua (东华镇), Baisha (白沙镇), Lianjiangkou (连江口镇), Shihuipu (石灰铺镇), Shuibian (水边镇), Xiniu (西牛镇), Jiulong (九龙镇), Dawan (大湾镇), Dadong (大洞镇), Huanghua (黄花镇), Shigutang (石牯塘镇), Hengshishui (横石水镇), Dazhan (大站镇), Lixi (黎溪镇), Boluo (波罗镇), Hanguang (浛洸镇), Yinghong (英红镇), Xiatai (下太镇), Hengshitang (横石塘镇)

=== Fogang County ===
Towns

- Shijiao (石角镇), Gaogang (高岗镇), Jingtou (迳头镇), Shuitou (水头镇), Tangtang (汤塘镇), Longshan (龙山镇)

=== Liannan Yao Autonomous County ===
Towns

- Sanjiang (三江镇), Zhaigang (寨岗镇), Sanpai (三排镇), Woshui (涡水镇), Xiangping (香坪镇), Daping (大坪镇), Damaishan (大麦山镇)

=== Lianshan Zhuang and Yao Autonomous County ===
Towns

- Jitian (吉田镇), Taibao (太保镇), Futang (福堂镇), Yonghe (永和镇), Hedong (禾洞镇), Shangshuai (上帅镇), Xiaosanjiang (小三江镇)

=== Yangshan County ===
Towns

- Yangcheng (阳城镇), Lingbei (岭背镇), Qinglian (青莲镇), Qigong (七拱镇), Taiping (太平镇), Libu (黎埠镇), Xiaojiang (小江镇), Huangben (黄坌镇), Jiangying (江英镇), Dubu (杜步镇), Yangmei (杨梅镇), Danang (大崀镇)

The only township is Chengjia Yao Ethnic Township (秤架瑶族乡)

== Shantou ==
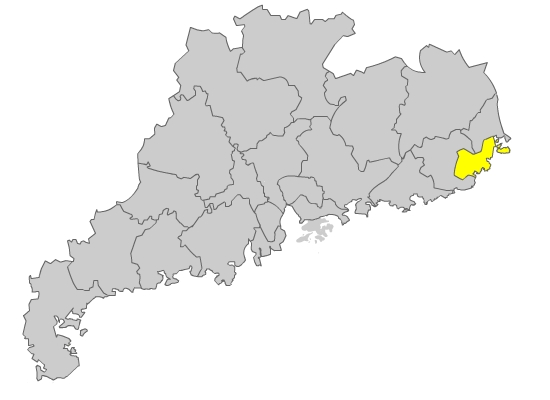
Location of Shantou in the province

=== Chaonan District ===
The only subdistrict is Xiashan Subdistrict (峡山街道)

Towns

- Jingdu (井都镇), Longtian (陇田镇), Leiling (雷岭镇), Chengtian (成田镇), Hongchang (红场镇), Lugang (胪岗镇), Liangying (两英镇), Xiancheng (仙城镇), Chendian (陈店镇), Simapu (司马浦镇)

=== Chaoyang District ===
Subdistricts

- Wenguang Subdistrict (文光街道), Chengnan Subdistrict (城南街道), Mianbei Subdistrict (棉北街道), Jinpu Subdistrict (金浦街道)

Towns

- Haimen (海门镇), Hexi (河溪镇), Heping (和平镇), Xilu (西胪镇), Guanbu (关埠镇), Jinzao (金灶镇), Gurao (谷饶镇), Guiyu (贵屿镇), Tongmeng (铜盂镇)

=== Chenghai District ===
Subdistricts

- Chenghua Subdistrict (澄华街道), Fengxiang Subdistrict (凤翔街道), Guangyi Subdistrict (广益街道)

Towns

- Lianxia (莲下镇), Lianshang (莲上镇), Lianhua (莲华镇), Dongli (东里镇), Xinan (溪南镇), Yanhong (盐鸿镇), Shanghua (上华镇), Longdu (隆都镇)

=== Haojiang District ===
Subdistricts

- Dahao Subdistrict (达濠街道), Majiao Subdistrict (马滘街道), Hushi Subdistrict (礐石街道), Guang'ao Subdistrict (广澳街道), Binhai Subdistrict (滨海街道), Hepu Subdistrict (河浦街道), Yuxin Subdistrict (玉新街道)

=== Jinping District ===
Subdistricts

- Shipaotai Subdistrict (石炮台街道), Jinsha Subdistrict (金砂街道), Jinxia Subdistrict (金厦街道), Dongdun Subdistrict (东墩街道), Dongfang Subdistrict (东方街道), Guangxia Subdistrict (广厦街道), Yuepu Subdistrict (月浦街道), Qishan Subdistrict (岐山街道), Dahua Subdistrict (大华街道), Wuqiao Subdistrict (乌桥街道), Guanghua Subdistrict (光华街道), Hai'an Subdistrict (海安街道), Xinfu Subdistrict (新福街道), Yongxiang Subdistrict (永祥街道), Tuolian Subdistrict (鮀莲街道), Tuojiang Subdistrict (鮀江街道), Tongyi Subdistrict (同益街道)

=== Longhu District ===
Subdistricts

- Jinxia Subdistrict (金霞街道), Zhuchi Subdistrict (珠池街道), Xinjin Subdistrict (新津街道), Longxiang Subdistrict (龙祥街道), Outing Subdistrict (鸥汀街道)

Towns

- Xinxi (新溪镇), Waisha (外砂镇)

=== Nan'ao County ===
Towns

- Houzhai (后宅镇), Shen'ao (深澳镇), Yun'ao (云澳镇)

== Shanwei ==
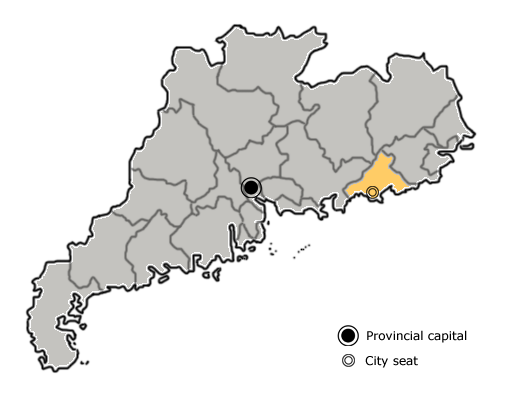
Location of Shanwei in the province

=== Cheng District ===
Subdistricts

- Xiangzhou Subdistrict (香洲街道), Xingang Subdistrict (新港街道), Fengshan Subdistrict (凤山街道), Magong Subdistrict (马宫街道), Tianqian Subdistrict (田墘街道), Dongzhou Subdistrict (东洲街道), Zhelang Subdistrict (遮浪街道)

Towns

- Jiesheng (捷胜镇), Hongcao (红草镇), Dongyong (东涌镇)

=== Lufeng ===
Subdistricts

- Donghai Subdistrict (东海街道), Chengdong Subdistrict (城东街道), Hexi Subdistrict (河西街道)

Towns

- Da'an (大安镇), Bawan (八万镇), Beiyang (陂洋镇), Bomei (博美镇), Nantang (南塘镇), Jiazi (甲子镇), Jiadong (甲东镇), Hudong (湖东镇), Jieshi (碣石镇), Jinxiang (金厢镇), Tanxi (潭西镇), Qiaochong (桥冲镇), Jiaxi (甲西镇), Shangying (上英镇), Xinan (西南镇), Neihu (内湖镇), Hedong (河东镇)

=== Haifeng County ===
Towns

- Haicheng (海城镇), Huangqiang (黄羌镇), Gongping (公平镇), Pingdong (平东镇), Ketang (可塘镇), Dahu (大湖镇), Chikeng (赤坑镇), Taohe (陶河镇), Lian'an (联安镇), Meilong (梅陇镇), Xiaomo (小漠镇), Ebu (鹅埠镇), Chishi (赤石镇), Houmen (鲘门镇)

=== Luhe County ===
Towns

- Hetian (河田镇), Shuichun (水唇镇), Hekou (河口镇), Xintian (新田镇), Shanghu (上护镇), Luoxi (螺溪镇), Dongkeng (东坑镇), Nanwan (南万镇)

== Shaoguan ==
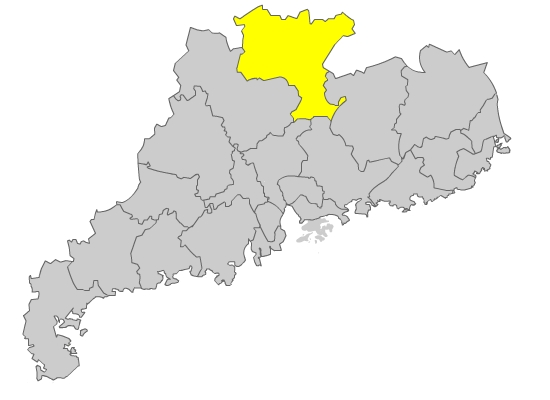
Location of Shaoguan in the province

=== Qujiang District ===
Towns

- Maba (马坝镇), Luokeng (罗坑镇), Zhangshi (樟市镇), Wushi (乌石镇), Shaxi (沙溪镇), Datang (大塘镇), Xiaokeng (小坑镇), Fengwan (枫湾镇), Baitu (白土镇)

=== Wujiang District ===
Subdistricts

- Xinhua Subdistrict (新华街道), Huimin Subdistrict (惠民街道)

Towns

- Xilian (西联镇), Xihe (西河镇), Jiangwan (江湾镇), Longgui (龙归镇), Chongyang (重阳镇)

=== Zhenjiang District ===
Subdistricts

- Donghe Subdistrict (东河街道), Chezhan Subdistrict (车站街道), Fengcai Subdistrict (风采街道)

Towns

- Xinshao (新韶镇), Leyuan (乐园镇), Shiliting (十里亭镇), Lishi (犁市镇), Huaping (花坪镇)

=== Lechang ===
The only subdistrict is Lecheng Subdistrict (乐城街道)

Towns

- Beixiang (北乡镇), Jiufeng (九峰镇), Langtian (廊田镇), Changlai (长来镇), Meihua (梅花镇), Sanxi (三溪镇), Pingshi (坪石镇), Huangpu (黄圃镇), Wushan (五山镇), Liangjiang (两江镇), Shaping (沙坪镇), Yunyan (云岩镇), Xiushui (秀水镇), Dayuan (大源镇), Qingyun (庆云镇), Baishi (白石镇)

=== Nanxiong ===
The only subdistrict is Xiongzhou Subdistrict (雄州街道)

Towns

- Zhuji (珠玑镇), Hukou (湖口镇), Huangkeng (黄坑镇), Wujing (乌迳镇), Jiezhi (界址镇), Shuikou (水口镇), Gushi (古市镇), Baishun (百顺镇), Lanhe (澜河镇), Dengfang (邓坊镇), Youshan (油山镇), Nanmu (南亩镇), Pingtian (坪田镇), Jiangtou (江头镇), Zhutian (主田镇), Quan'an (全安镇), Maozifeng (帽子峰镇)

=== Renhua County ===
The only subdistrict is Zhouxia Subdistrict (丹霞街道)

Towns

- Chengkou (城口镇), Changjiang (长江镇), Fuxi (扶溪镇), Dongtang (董塘镇), Shitang (石塘镇), Wenshao (闻韶镇), Hongshan (红山镇), Huangkeng (黄坑镇), Daqiao (大桥镇), Zhoutian (周田镇)

=== Shixing County ===
Towns

- Taiping (太平镇), Mashi (马市镇), Chengjiang (澄江镇), Dungang (顿岗镇), Luoba (罗坝镇), Siqian (司前镇), Aizi (隘子镇), Chengnan (城南镇), Shensuo (沈所镇)

The only township is Shendushui Yao Ethnic Township (深渡水瑶族乡)

=== Wengyuan County ===
Towns

- Longxian (龙仙镇), Jiangwei (江尾镇), Bazai (坝仔镇), Zhoubei (周陂镇), Wengcheng (翁城镇), Xinjiang (新江镇), Guandu (官渡镇)

=== Xinfeng County ===
The only subdistrict is Fengcheng Subdistrict (丰城街道)

Towns

- Matou (马头镇), Meikeng (梅坑镇), Shatian (沙田镇), Yaotian (遥田镇), Huilong (回龙镇), Huangqi (黄磜镇)

=== Ruyuan Yao Autonomous County ===
Towns

- Rucheng (乳城镇), Bibei (必背镇), Guitou (桂头镇), Yiliu (一六镇), Dabu (大布镇), Daqiao (大桥镇), Youxi (游溪镇), Luoyang (洛阳镇), Dongping (东坪镇)

== Yangjiang ==
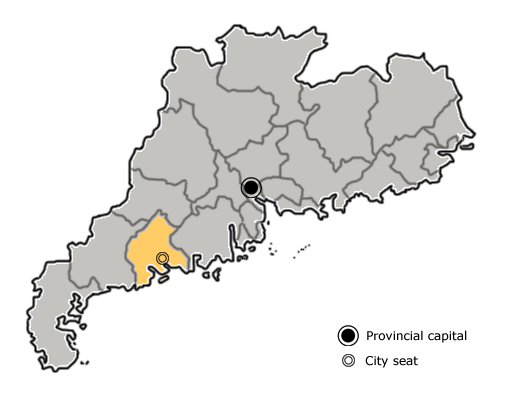
Location of Yangjiang in the province

=== Jiangcheng District ===
Subdistricts

- Nan'en Subdistrict (南恩街道), Chengbei Subdistrict (城北街道), Chengnan Subdistrict (城南街道), Chengdong Subdistrict (城东街道), Zhongzhou Subdistrict (中洲街道), Chengxi Subdistrict (城西街道), Baisha Subdistrict (白沙街道), Ganglie Subdistrict (岗列街道)

Towns

- Buchang (埠场镇), Shuangjie (双捷镇), Pinggang (平冈镇), Hailing (海陵镇), Zhapo (闸坡镇)

=== Yangchun ===
The only subdistrict is Chuncheng Subdistrict (春城街道)

Towns

- Helang (河塱镇), Songbai (松柏镇), Baimian (陂面镇), Heshui (合水镇), Chunwan (春湾镇), Gangmei (岗美镇), Hekou (河口镇), Tanshui (潭水镇), Bajia (八甲镇), Shuangjiao (双窖镇), Yongning (永宁镇), Guigang (圭岗镇), Shiwang (石望镇), Mashui (马水镇), Sanjia (三甲镇)

=== Yangdong County ===
Towns

- Dongcheng (东城镇), Beiguan (北惯镇), Heshan (合山镇), Dagou (大沟镇), Dongping (东平镇), Yashao (雅韶镇), Tangping (塘坪镇), Daba (大八镇), Hongfeng (红丰镇), Nalong (那龙镇), Xinzhou (新洲镇)

=== Yangxi County ===
Towns

- Zhigong (织篢镇), Chengcun (程村镇), Xitou (溪头镇), Shangyang (上洋镇), Shaba (沙扒镇 ), Rudong (儒洞镇), Xinxu (新圩镇), Tangkou (塘口镇)

== Yunfu ==
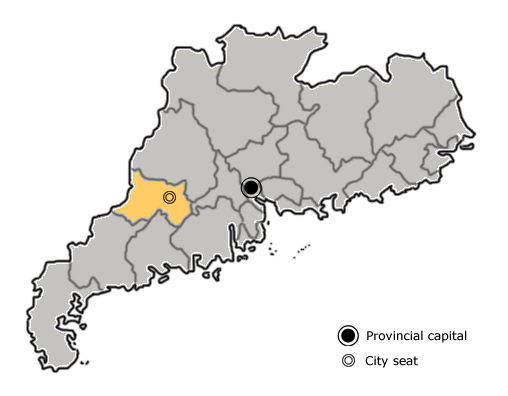
Location of Yunfu in the province

=== Yuncheng District ===
Subdistricts

- Yuncheng Subdistrict (云城街道), Gaofeng Subdistrict (高峰街道), Hekou Subdistrict (河口街道), Antang Subdistrict (安塘街道)

Towns

- Duyang (都杨镇), Yaogu (腰古镇), Silao (思劳镇)

=== Luoding ===
Subdistricts

- Luocheng Subdistrict (罗城街道), Fucheng Subdistrict (附城街道), Shuangdong Subdistrict (双东街道), Sulong Subdistrict (素龙街道)

Towns

- Huashi (华石镇), Pingtang (苹塘镇), Jinji (金鸡镇), Weidi (围底镇), Mantang (满塘镇), Chuanbu (船步镇), Luoping (罗平镇), Taiping (太平镇), Luojing (罗镜镇), Shengjiang (生江镇), Lianzhou (连州镇), Fenjie (分界镇), Lishao (黎少镇), Silun (泗纶镇), Jiayi (加益镇), Tanbin (榃滨镇), Longwan (龙湾镇)

=== Xinxing County ===
Towns

- Xincheng (新城镇), Shuitai (水台镇), Chegang (车岗镇), Dongcheng (东成镇), Rencun (稔村镇), Taiping (太平镇), Liuzu (六祖镇), Dajiang (大江镇), Hetou (河头镇), Tiantang (天堂镇), Lezhu (簕竹镇), Lidong (里洞镇)

=== Yunan County ===
Towns

- Ducheng (都城镇), Dongba (东坝镇), Songgui (宋桂镇), Liantan (连滩镇), Hekou (河口镇), Dawan (大湾镇), Jiancheng (建城镇), Qianguan (千官镇), Tongmen (通门镇), Guixu (桂圩镇), Pingtai (平台镇), Baozhu (宝珠镇), Lidong (历洞镇), Dafang (大方镇), Nanjiangkou (南江口镇)

=== Yun'an County ===
Towns

- Liudu (六都镇), Qianfeng (前锋镇), Nansheng (南盛镇), Fulin (富林镇), Zhen'an (镇安镇), Baishi (白石镇), Gaocun (高村镇), Shicheng (石城镇)

== Zhanjiang ==
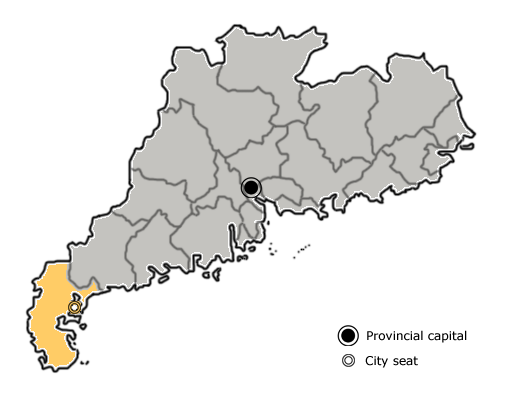
Location of Zhanjiang in the province

=== Chikan District ===
Subdistricts

- Nanqiao Subdistrict (南桥街道), Zhonghua Subdistrict (中华街道), Cunjin Subdistrict (寸金街道), Minzhu Subdistrict (民主街道), Zhongshan Subdistrict (中山街道), Tiaoshun Subdistrict (调顺街道), Shawan Subdistrict (沙湾街道), Beiqiao Subdistrict (北桥街道)

=== Mazhang District ===
Towns

- Mazhang (麻章镇), Taiping (太平镇), Huguang (湖光镇), Dongshan (东山镇), Min'an (民安镇), Dongjian (东简镇), Naozhou (硇洲镇)

=== Potou District ===
Subdistricts

- Nandiao Subdistrict (南调街道), Maxie Subdistrict (麻斜街道)

Towns

- Potou (坡头镇), Longtou (龙头镇), Gantang (乾塘镇), Nansan (南三镇), Guandu (官渡镇)

=== Xiashan District ===
Subdistricts

- Gongnong Subdistrict (工农街道), Jiefang Subdistrict (解放街道), Aiguo Subdistrict (爱国街道), Youyi Subdistrict (友谊街道), Xinxing Subdistrict (新兴街道), Haibin Subdistrict (海滨街道), Lehua Subdistrict (乐华街道), Xinyuan Subdistrict (新园街道), Jianshe Subdistrict (建设街道), Dongxin Subdistrict (东新街道), Haitou Subdistrict (海头街道), Quanzhuang Subdistrict (泉庄街道)

=== Leizhou ===
The only subdistrict is Leicheng Subdistrict (雷城街道)

Towns

- Chentang (沈塘镇), Dongli (东里镇), Leigao (雷高镇), Diaofeng (调风镇), Yingli (英利镇), Nanxing (南兴镇), Longmen (龙门镇), Songzhu (松竹镇), Tandou (覃斗镇), Wushi (乌石镇), Beihe (北和镇), Qishui (企水镇), Tangjia (唐家镇), Yangjia (杨家镇), Jijia (纪家镇), Baisha (白沙镇), Kelu (客路镇), Fucheng (附城镇)

=== Lianjiang ===
Subdistricts

- Luozhou Subdistrict (罗州街道), Chengbei Subdistrict (城北街道), Chengnan Subdistrict (城南街道)

Towns

- Shijiao (石角镇), Hechun (河唇镇), Liangdong (良垌镇), Shicheng (石城镇), Xinmin (新民镇), Anpu (Onpo) (安埔镇 (安舖)), Yingzai (营仔镇), Cheban (车板镇), Hengshan (横山镇), Gaoqiao (高桥镇), Heliao (和寮镇), Yatang (雅塘镇), Qingping (青平镇), Shiling (石岭镇), Shijing (石颈镇), Jishui (吉水镇), Changshan (长山镇), Tangpeng (塘蓬镇)

=== Wuchuan ===
Subdistricts

- Meilu Subdistrict (梅菉街道), Bopu Subdistrict (博铺街道), Haibin Subdistrict (海滨街道), Tangwei Subdistrict (塘尾街道), Dashanjiang Subdistrict (大山江街道)

Towns

- Lanshi (兰石镇), Tanba (覃巴镇), Wuyang (吴阳镇), Huangpo (黄坡镇), Zhenwen (振文镇), Zhangpu (樟铺镇), Tangzhui (塘缀镇), Changqi (长岐镇), Qianshui (浅水镇), Wangcungang (王村港镇)

=== Suixi County ===
Towns

- Suicheng (遂城镇), Huanglue (黄略镇), Jianxin (建新镇), Lingbei (岭北镇), Chengyue (城月镇), Hetou (河头镇), Jianghong (江洪镇), Lemin (乐民镇), Wutang (乌塘镇), Beipo (北坡镇), Gangmen (港门镇), Caotan (草潭镇), Yangqing (洋青镇), Yanggan (杨柑镇), Jiepao (界炮镇)

=== Xuwen County ===
The only subdistrict is Xuecheng Subdistrict (徐城街道)

Towns

- He'an (和安镇), Qujie (曲界镇), Jinhe (锦和镇), Xinliao (新寮镇), Xiayang (下洋镇), Qianshan (前山镇), Longtang (龙塘镇), Hai'an (海安镇), Maichen (迈陈镇), Xilian (西连镇), Xiaqiao (下桥镇), Nanshan (南山镇)

Townships

- Chengbei Township (城北乡), Juewei Township (角尾乡)

== Zhaoqing ==
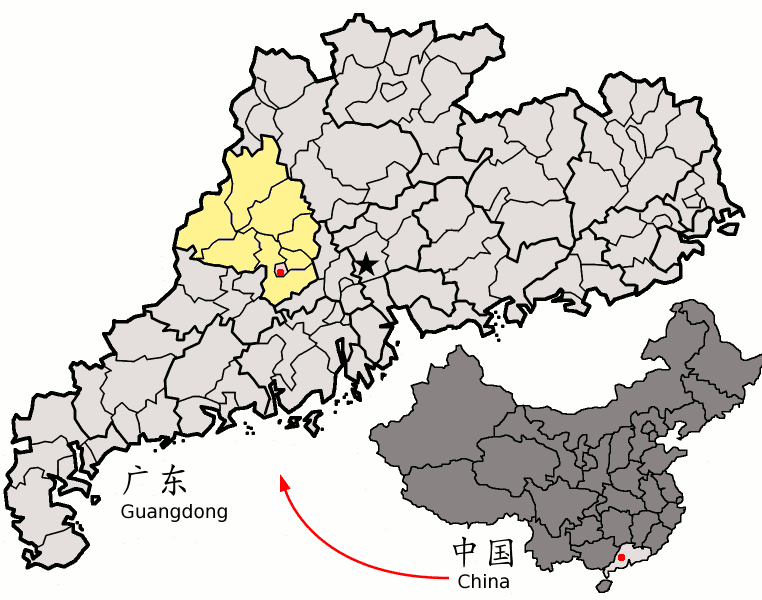
Location of Zhaoqing in the province

=== Dinghu District ===
Subdistricts

- Kengkou Subdistrict (坑口街道), Guicheng Subdistrict (桂城街道), Guangli Subdistrict (广利街道)

Towns

- Yong'an (永安镇), Shapu (沙浦镇), Fenghuang (凤凰镇), Lianhua (莲花镇)

=== Duanzhou District ===
Subdistricts

- Chengdong Subdistrict (城东街道), Chengxi Subdistrict (城西街道), Chengnan Subdistrict (城南街道), Chengbei Subdistrict (城北街道)

Towns

- Huanggang (黄岗镇), Mugang (睦岗镇)

=== Gaoyao ===
The only subdistrict is Nan'an Subdistrict (南岸街道)

Towns

- Jindu (金渡镇), Jinli (金利镇), Xiangang (蚬岗镇), Baitu (白土镇), Huilong (回龙镇), Jiaotang (蛟塘镇), Liantang (莲塘镇), Huodao (活道镇), Xinqiao (新桥镇), Baizhu (白诸镇), Dawan (大湾镇), Lubu (禄步镇), Xiaoxiang (小湘镇), Hetai (河台镇), Lecheng (乐城镇), Shuinan (水南镇)

=== Sihui ===
Subdistricts

- Dongcheng Subdistrict (东城街道), Chengzhong Subdistrict (城中街道), Zhenshan Subdistrict (贞山街道)

Towns

- Longfu (龙甫镇), Dedou (地豆镇), Weizheng (威整镇), Luoyuan (罗源镇), Jingkou (迳口镇), Dasha (大沙镇), Shigou (石狗镇), Huangtian (黄田镇), Xiamao (下茆镇), Jianggu (江谷镇)

=== Deqing County ===
The only subdistrict is Decheng Subdistrict (德城街道)

Towns

- Xinxu (新圩镇), Guanxu (官圩镇), Maxu (马圩镇), Gaoliang (高良镇), Mocun (莫村镇), Yongfeng (永丰镇), Wulong (武垄镇), Pozhi (播植镇), Fengcun (凤村镇), Jiushi (九市镇), Yuecheng (悦城镇), Huilong (回龙镇)

=== Fengkai County ===
Towns

- Jiangkou (江口镇), Nanfeng (南丰镇), Chang'an (长安镇), Jinzhuang (金装镇), Baigou (白垢镇), Liandu (莲都镇), Yulao (渔涝镇), Dayukou (大玉口镇), Luodong (罗董镇), Changgang (长岗镇), Pingfeng (平凤镇), Dazhou (大洲镇), Duping (都平镇), Jiangchuan (江川镇), Xinghua (杏花镇), He'erkou (河儿口镇)

=== Guangning County ===
Towns

- Nanjie (南街镇), Chikeng (赤坑镇), Beishi (北市镇), Jiangtun (江屯镇), Lianhe (联和镇), Tanpu (潭布镇), Paisha (排沙镇), Shijian (石涧镇), Binheng (宾亨镇), Hengshan (横山镇), Wuhe (五和镇), Muge (木格镇), Zhouzi (洲仔镇), Gushui (古水镇), Kengkou (坑口镇), Luogang (螺岗镇), Shiju (石咀镇)

=== Huaiji County ===
Towns

- Huaicheng (怀城镇), Lianmai (连麦镇), Zhongzhou (中洲镇), Qiashui (洽水镇), Fenggang (凤岗镇), Ao'zi (坳仔镇), Shidong (诗洞镇), Qiaotou (桥头镇), Dagang (大岗镇), Liangcun (梁村镇), Gangping (岗坪镇), Maning (马宁镇), Lengkeng (冷坑镇), Wenlang (汶朗镇), Gansa (甘洒镇), Yonggu (永固镇), Zhagang (闸岗镇), Langang (蓝钟镇)

The only ethnic township is Shuai Zhuang and Yao Ethnic Township (帅壮族瑶族乡)

== Zhongshan ==
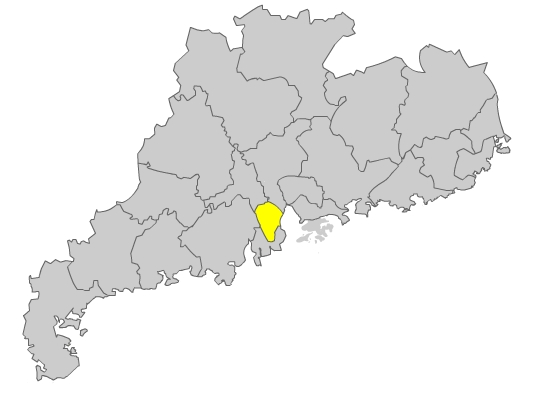
Location of Zhongshan in the province

Note: County-level divisions are absent in Zhongshan, so the township-level divisions form the third-level administrative unit.

Subdistricts

- Dongqu Subdistrict (东区街道), Nanqu Subdistrict (南区街道), Shiqi Subdistrict (石岐街道), Xiqu Subdistrict (西区街道), Wuguishan Subdistrict (五桂山街道), Zhongshangang Subdistrict (中山港街道)

Towns

- Banfu (板芙镇), Dachong (大涌镇), Dongfeng (东凤镇), Dongsheng (东升镇), Fusha (阜沙镇), Gangkou (港口镇), Guzhen (古镇镇), Henglan (横栏镇), Huangpu (黄圃镇), Minzhong (民众镇), Nanlang (南朗镇), Nantou (南头镇), Sanjiao (三角镇), Sanxiang (三乡镇), Shaxi (沙溪镇), Shenwan (神湾镇), Tanzhou (坦洲镇), Xiaolan (小榄镇)

== Zhuhai ==
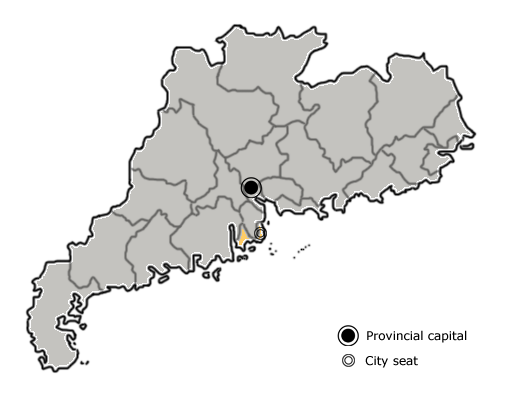
Location of Zhuhai in the province

=== Doumen District ===
Towns

- Jing'an (井岸镇), Baijiao (白蕉镇), Ganwu (乾务镇), Doumen (斗门镇), Lianzhou (莲洲镇)

=== Jinwan District ===
Towns

- Sanzao (三灶镇), Hongqi (红旗镇), Pingsha (平沙镇), Nanshui (南水镇)

=== Xiangzhou District ===
Subdistricts

- Meihua Subdistrict (梅华街道), Gongbei Subdistrict (拱北街道), Jida Subdistrict (吉大街道), Cuixiang Subdistrict (翠香街道), Shishan Subdistrict (狮山街道), Xiangwan Subdistrict (香湾街道), Qianshan Subdistrict (前山街道), Wanzi Subdistrict (湾仔街道)

Towns

- Nanping (南屏镇), Hengqin (横琴镇), Tangjiawan (唐家湾镇), Guishan (桂山镇), Dangan (担杆镇), Wanshan (万山镇)
