= Yuxin =

Yuxin may refer to:

== Places in China ==
- Yuxin, Hubei (渔薪), a town in Tianmen, Hubei
- Yuxin, Inner Mongolia (育新), a town in Tongliao, Inner Mongolia
- Yuxin, Zhejiang (余新), a town in Jiaxing, Zhejiang
- Yuxin Subdistrict (玉新街道), Haojiang Subdistrict, Shantou, Guangdong
- Yuxin Station (育新站), on Line 8 of the Beijing Subway

== People ==
- Xie Yuxin (谢育新), a Chinese footballer
- Liu Yuxin (刘雨欣), a Chinese actress and model

== Companies ==
- Yuxin, a Chinese speedcube manufacturing company.
