= Xinfeng =

Xinfeng may refer to:

- Xinfeng, Hsinchu (新豐鄉), township in Hsinchu County, Taiwan

== Mainland China ==
- Xinfeng County, Guangdong (新丰县)
- Xinfeng County, Jiangxi (信丰县)
- Xinfeng, Jiangsu (辛丰镇), town in Dantu District, Zhenjiang
- Xinfeng Township, Anhui (新丰乡), in Huangshan District, Huangshan City
- Xinfeng Township, Jiangxi (新丰乡), in Yihuang County
