= Liuhuang =

Liuhuang may refer to:

- Liuhuang, Guangdong (留隍), a town in Fengshun County, Guangdong, China
- Liuhuang Township (柳黄乡), a township in Wanyuan, Sichuan, China
- Liuhuang Expressway

== See also ==
- Lưu Huỳnh (劉皇, Líu Huáng, born 1960), a Vietnamese American film director
