= Xieji =

Xieji (谢集 unless otherwise noted) may refer to the following locations in China:

- Xieji, Guangdong (谢鸡镇), in Gaozhou
- Xieji, Henan, in Liangyuan District, Shangqiu
- Xieji, Shandong, in Shan County
- Xieji Township, Linquan County, Anhui
