= Huangjin =

Huangjin (黄金) may refer to these places in China:

- Huangjin Township, a township in Ruichang, Jiangxi
- Huangjin, Chongqing, a town in Zhong County, Chongqing
- Huangjin, Guangdong, a town in Fengshun County, Guangdong
- Huangjin, Guangxi, a town in Luocheng Mulao Autonomous County, Guangxi
- Huangjin, Nanbu County, a town in Nanbu County, Sichuan
- Huangjin, Xuanhan County, a town in Xuanhan County, Sichuan

== Airports ==
- Ganzhou Huangjin Airport, in Ganzhou, Jiangxi
- Ganzhou Huangjin Airport (former)

== See also ==
- Yellow Turban Rebellion (184–205), a major rebellion in the late Han dynasty, also known as the Huangjin Rebellion
