= Jinsha Subdistrict =

Coordinates: 23.37208°N 116.69386°E

Jinsha Subdistrict 金砂街道
- Subdistrict

Chinese transcription(s)
  - Chinese: 金沙街道
- Interactive map of Jinsha Subdistrict
- Country: China
- Province: Guangdong
- Prefecture: Shantou
- Time zone: UTC+8 (China Standard Time)

Jinsha (Chinese: 金砂街道) is a subdistrict of the Jinping District, Shantou City, Guangdong Province, China.

== See also ==
- List of township-level divisions of Guangdong
