= Puzhai =

Town in Guangdong Province, China

Coordinates: 23.6523°N 116.1508°E

- Simplified Chinese: 埔寨镇
Transcriptions
Standard Mandarin
- Hanyu Pinyin: Pǔzhài Zhèn

Puzhai is a town located in Fengshun County, Meizhou City, Guangdong Province, China.

== See also ==
- List of township-level divisions of Guangdong
