= Beidou, Fengshun County =

Town in Guangdong, China

Coordinates: 23.8225°N 116.1323°E

- Simplified Chinese: 北斗镇
Transcriptions
Standard Mandarin
- Hanyu Pinyin: Běidǒu Zhèn

Beidou is a town located in Fengshun County, Meizhou City, Guangdong Province, China.

== See also ==
- List of township-level divisions of Guangdong
