= Chengbei Subdistrict, Yangjiang =

Chengbei Subdistrict 城北街道
- Subdistrict
- Location in Guangdong
- Coordinates: 21°52′33″N 111°58′05″E
- Country: People's Republic of China
- Province: Guangdong
- Prefecture-level city: Yangjiang
- District: Jiangcheng
- Elevation: 10 m (33 ft)
- Time zone: UTC+8 (China Standard)
- Area code: 0662

Chengbei Subdistrict (Chinese: 城北街道; pinyin: Chéngběi Jiēdào; lit. 'city north') is a subdistrict of Jiangcheng District, Yangjiang, Guangdong, People's Republic of China, occupying the northern portion of the district as suggested by its name. As of 2011, it has six residential communities (社区) and two villages under its administration.

== See also ==
- List of township-level divisions of Guangdong
