= Tanjiang, Guangdong =

Tanjiang 潭江镇
- Town
- Location in Guangdong
- Coordinates: 24°05′38″N 116°31′48″E
- Country: People's Republic of China
- Province: Guangdong
- Prefecture-level city: Meizhou
- County: Fengshun County
- Time zone: UTC+8 (China Standard)

Tanjiang (Chinese: 潭江; pinyin: Tánjiāng) is a town located in Fengshun County, Meizhou City, Guangdong Province, China. As of 2018, it has one residential community and 18 villages under its administration.

== See also ==
- List of township-level divisions of Guangdong
