= Cheban =

Cheban or Ceban is a Romanian surname that may refer to

- Ion Ceban (born 1980), Mayor of Chișinău, Moldova
- Jonathan Cheban (born c. 1974), American reality star
- Nicolae Ceban (born 1986), Moldovan freestyle wrestler
- Yuriy Cheban (born 1986), Ukrainian sprint canoeist
- Yury Cheban (born 1958), Minister in Transnistria
