= Dule Township =

Dule Township 独乐乡
- Rural Township
- Dúlè Xiāng
- Location in Hebei Location in China
- Coordinates: 39°05′04″N 115°12′49″E
- Country: People's Republic of China
- Province: Hebei
- Prefecture-level city: Baoding
- County-level city: Yi County

Area
  - Total: 30.89 km^{2} (11.93 sq mi)

Population (2010)
  - Total: 10,083
  - Density: 326.4/km^{2} (845/sq mi)
- Time zone: UTC+8 (China Standard)

Dule Township (Chinese: 独乐乡; pinyin: Dúlè Xiāng) is a rural township located in Yi County, Baoding, Hebei, China. According to the 2010 census, Dule Township had a population of 10,083, including 5,246 males and 4,837 females. The population was distributed as follows: 1,618 people aged under 14, 7,533 people aged between 15 and 64, and 932 people aged over 65.

== See also ==
- List of township-level divisions of Hebei
