= Hedong, Shanwei =

Hedong 河东镇
- Town
- Location in Guangdong
- Coordinates: 22°58′48″N 115°38′59″E
- Country: People's Republic of China
- Province: Guangdong
- Prefecture-level city: Shanwei
- County-level city: Lufeng
- Village-level divisions: 10 villages
- Elevation: 10 m (33 ft)
- Time zone: UTC+8 (China Standard)
- Area code: 0660

Hedong (simplified Chinese: 河东; traditional Chinese: 河東; pinyin: Hédōng; lit. 'river east') is a town under the administration of Lufeng in southeastern Guangdong province, China, located north of downtown Lufeng. As of 2018, it has ten villages under its administration.

== See also ==
- List of township-level divisions of Guangdong
