= Gaomo Township =

Gaomo Township 高陌乡
- Rural Township
- Gāomò Xiāng
- Location in Hebei Location in China
- Coordinates: 39°17′05″N 115°33′14″E
- Country: People's Republic of China
- Province: Hebei
- Prefecture-level city: Baoding
- County: Yi

Area
  - Total: 63.56 km^{2} (24.54 sq mi)

Population (2010)
  - Total: 44,959
  - Density: 707.4/km^{2} (1,832/sq mi)
- Time zone: UTC+8 (China Standard)

Gaomo Township (Chinese: 高陌乡; pinyin: Gāomò Xiāng) is a rural township located in Yi County, Baoding, Hebei, China. According to the 2010 census, Gaomo Township had a population of 44,959, including 22,410 males and 22,549 females. The population was distributed as follows: 6,817 people aged under 14, 34,363 people aged between 15 and 64, and 3,779 people aged over 65.

== See also ==
- List of township-level divisions of Hebei
