= Yi County, Hebei =

Yi County 易县
- County
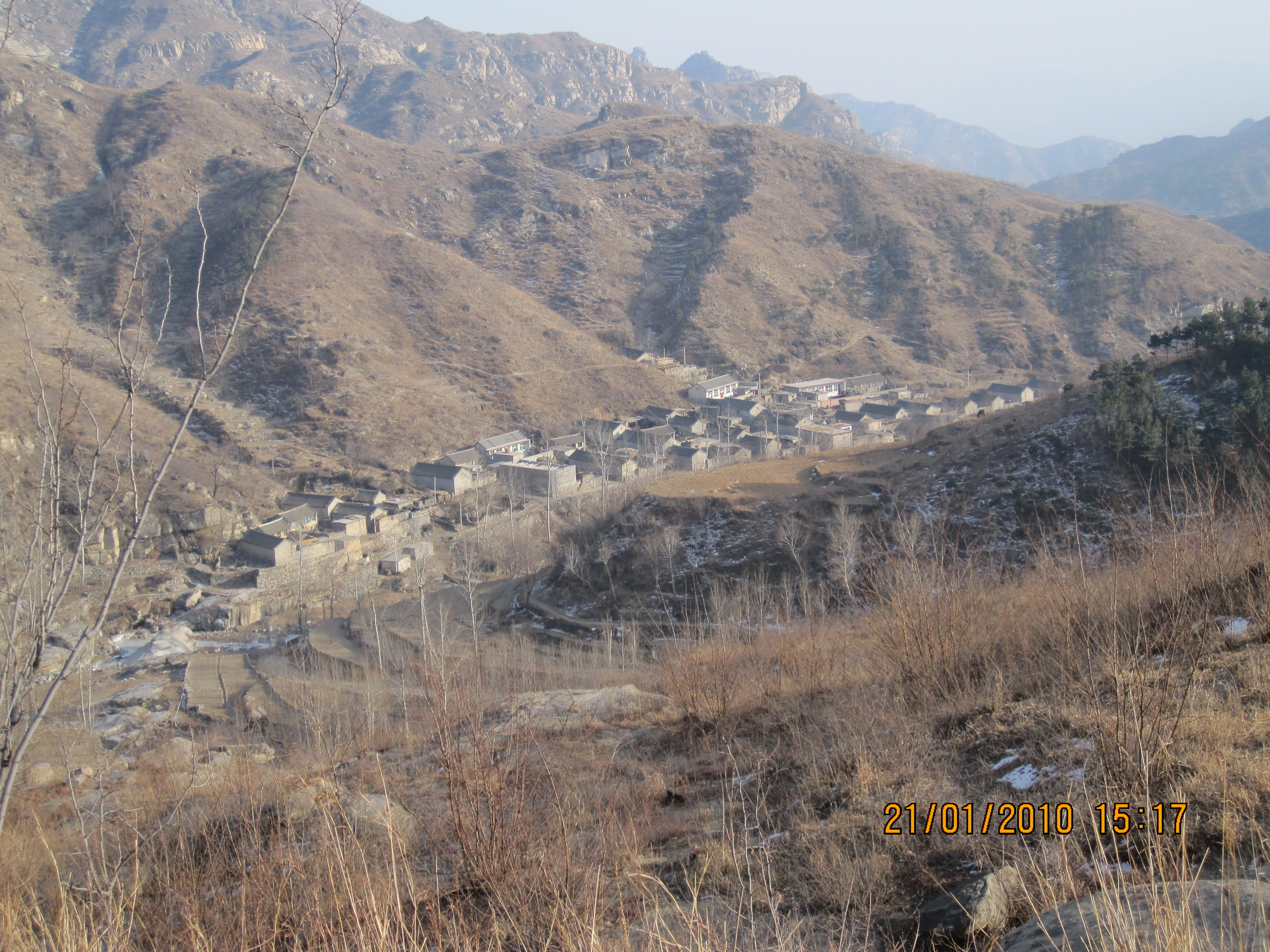
- Taihang Mountains in Yi County

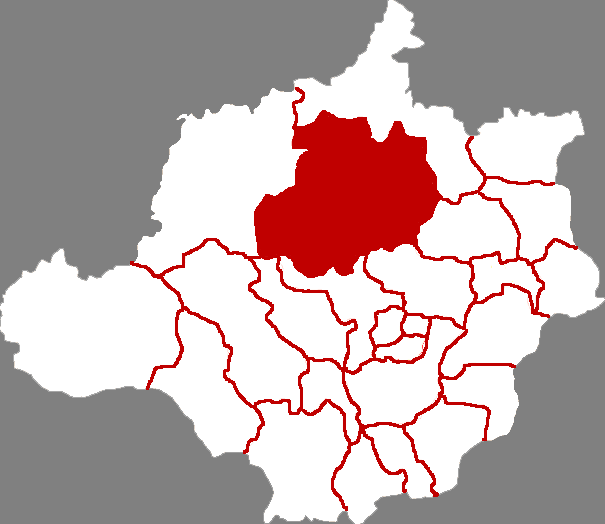
- Yi County in Baoding

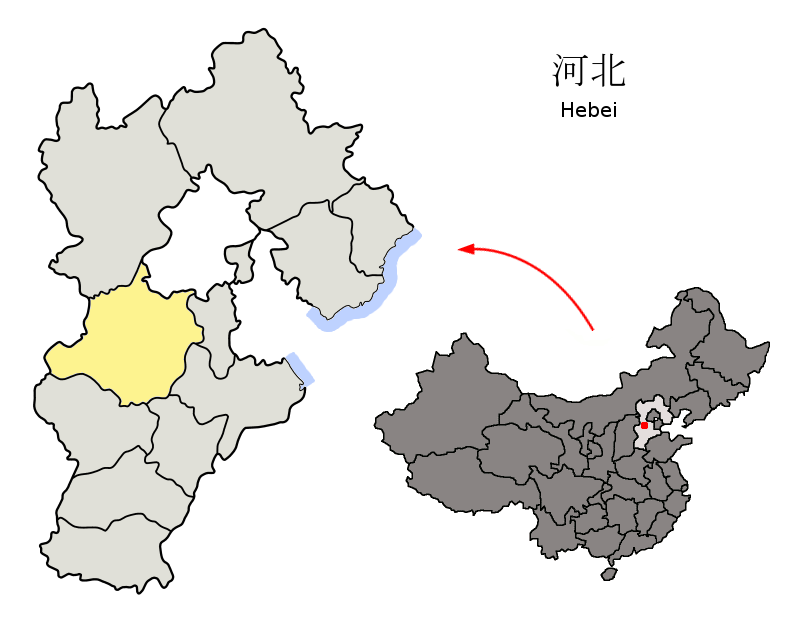
- Baoding in Hebei
- Coordinates: 39°20′56″N 115°29′53″E
- Country: People's Republic of China
- Province: Hebei
- Prefecture-level city: Baoding

Area
  - Total: 2,534 km^{2} (978 sq mi)

Population (2013)
  - Total: 557,400
  - Density: 220.0/km^{2} (569.7/sq mi)
- Time zone: UTC+8 (China Standard)

Yi County, Hebei
- Traditional Chinese: 易縣
- Simplified Chinese: 易县
Transcriptions
Standard Mandarin
- Hanyu Pinyin: Yì Xiàn
- Wade–Giles: I Hsien

Yi County, also known as Yi Xian or Yixian, is a county in Hebei province of China, administratively under the jurisdiction of the prefecture-level city of Baoding. It has an area of 2,538 km^{2} (980 sq mi).

== History ==
This is the site where the assassin Jing Ke set off on his final journey to assassinate the King of Qin. Yi Prefecture (易州, Yì Zhōu) was based in the area under the Tang.

== Administrative divisions ==
Towns:

- Yizhou (易州镇), Luangezhuang (梁格庄镇), Xiling (西陵镇), Peishan (裴山镇), Tanghu (塘湖镇), Langyashan (狼牙山镇), Lianggang (良岗镇), Zijingguan (紫荆关镇)

Townships:

- Qiaotou Township (桥头乡), Baima Township (白马乡), Liujing Township (流井乡), Gaocun Township (高村乡), Gaomo Township (高陌乡), Dalonghua Township (大龙华乡), Angezhuang Township (安格庄乡), Xishanbei Township (西山北乡), Weidu Township (尉都乡), Dule Township (独乐乡), Qiyu Township (七峪乡), Fugang Township (富岗乡), Pocang Township (坡仓乡), Niugang Township (牛岗乡), Qiaojiahe Township (桥家河乡), Ganhejing Township (甘河净乡), Caijiayu Township (蔡家峪乡), Nanchengsi Township (南城司乡), Lingyunce Hui and Manchu Ethnic Township (凌云册回族满族乡)

== Climate ==
Climate data for Yixian, elevation 49 m (161 ft), (1991–2020 normals, extremes 1981–2010)
Month	Jan	Feb	Mar	Apr	May	Jun	Jul	Aug	Sep	Oct	Nov	Dec	Year
Record high °C (°F)	14.2 (57.6)	19.6 (67.3)	30.1 (86.2)	33.3 (91.9)	38.5 (101.3)	40.5 (104.9)	41.0 (105.8)	36.8 (98.2)	34.9 (94.8)	31.3 (88.3)	23.0 (73.4)	15.0 (59.0)	41.0 (105.8)
Mean daily maximum °C (°F)	2.2 (36.0)	6.6 (43.9)	13.0 (55.4)	20.9 (69.6)	26.8 (80.2)	30.9 (87.6)	31.6 (88.9)	30.1 (86.2)	26.3 (79.3)	19.6 (67.3)	10.4 (50.7)	3.7 (38.7)	18.5 (65.3)
Daily mean °C (°F)	−3.8 (25.2)	0.4 (32.7)	7.0 (44.6)	14.8 (58.6)	20.8 (69.4)	25.1 (77.2)	26.8 (80.2)	25.4 (77.7)	20.5 (68.9)	13.3 (55.9)	4.5 (40.1)	−1.8 (28.8)	12.8 (54.9)
Mean daily minimum °C (°F)	−8.3 (17.1)	−4.3 (24.3)	1.7 (35.1)	8.9 (48.0)	14.8 (58.6)	19.7 (67.5)	22.5 (72.5)	21.4 (70.5)	15.8 (60.4)	8.3 (46.9)	0.1 (32.2)	−5.8 (21.6)	7.9 (46.2)
Record low °C (°F)	−17.7 (0.1)	−17.7 (0.1)	−9.5 (14.9)	−1.8 (28.8)	3.5 (38.3)	9.7 (49.5)	16.0 (60.8)	14.1 (57.4)	4.2 (39.6)	−3.7 (25.3)	−12.2 (10.0)	−17.0 (1.4)	−17.7 (0.1)
Average precipitation mm (inches)	2.3 (0.09)	4.6 (0.18)	8.6 (0.34)	20.4 (0.80)	32.9 (1.30)	72.0 (2.83)	170.7 (6.72)	126.4 (4.98)	59.1 (2.33)	26.6 (1.05)	10.9 (0.43)	2.2 (0.09)	536.7 (21.14)
Average precipitation days (≥ 0.1 mm)	1.6	1.9	2.7	4.6	6.5	9.8	12.7	11.0	7.9	5.3	3.0	1.6	68.6
Average snowy days	2.6	2.3	1.0	0.1	0	0	0	0	0	0	1.5	2.2	9.7
Average relative humidity (%)	56	51	47	49	55	62	75	79	74	69	65	59	62
Mean monthly sunshine hours	159.9	165.0	209.2	227.7	248.9	201.9	177.1	189.2	189.8	179.4	156.5	154.8	2,259.4
Percentage possible sunshine	53	54	56	57	56	45	39	45	51	53	53	53	51
Source: China Meteorological Administration

== See also ==
- Western Qing Tombs
- Xiadu
