= Nantang, Lufeng, Guangdong =

Coordinates: 22.91225°N 115.90858°E

Nantang 南塘
- Subdistrict

Chinese transcription(s)
- Interactive map of Nantang
- Country: China
- Province: Guangdong
- Prefecture: Shanwei
- County-level city: Lufeng
- Time zone: UTC+8 (China Standard Time)

Nantang (Chinese: 南塘; pinyin: Nántáng) is a township-level division situated in Shanwei, Guangdong, China.

== See also ==
- List of township-level divisions of Guangdong
