= Baxiangshan =

Town in Fengshun, Meizhou, Guangdong, China

Coordinates: 23.7642°N 115.9696°E

- Simplified Chinese: 八乡山镇
Transcriptions
Standard Mandarin
- Hanyu Pinyin: Bāxiāngshān Zhèn

Baxiangshan is a town located in Fengshun County, Meizhou City, Guangdong Province, China.

== See also ==
- List of township-level divisions of Guangdong
