= Hedong Subdistrict, Maoming =

Hedong Subdistrict 河东街道
- Subdistrict
- Location in Guangdong
- Coordinates: 21°39′33″N 110°54′55″E
- Country: People's Republic of China
- Province: Guangdong
- Prefecture-level city: Maoming
- District: Maonan
- Village-level divisions: 16 residential communities
- Elevation: 27 m (89 ft)
- Time zone: UTC+8 (China Standard)
- Postal code: 525000
- Area code: 0668

Hedong Subdistrict (simplified Chinese: 河东街道; traditional Chinese: 河東街道; pinyin: Hédōng Jiēdào; lit. 'river east') is a subdistrict of Maonan District, in the heart of Maoming, Guangdong, People's Republic of China. As of 2018, it has 16 residential communities (居委会) under its administration.

== See also ==
- List of township-level divisions of Guangdong
