= Xinan, Shanwei =

Coordinates: 23.0590°N 115.5564°E

Xinan 西南镇
- Subdistrict

Chinese transcription(s)
- Interactive map of Xinan
- Country: China
- Province: Guangdong
- Prefecture: Shanwei
- County-level city: Lufeng
- Time zone: UTC+8 (China Standard Time)

Xinan (Chinese: 西南镇; pinyin: Xīnán) is a town situated in the Lufeng District of Shanwei City, Guangdong, China.

== See also ==
- List of township-level divisions of Guangdong
