= Shatian, Fengshun County =

Town in Guangdong, China

Coordinates: 24.1397°N 116.4528°E

- Traditional Chinese: 砂田鎮
- Simplified Chinese: 砂田镇
Transcriptions
Standard Mandarin
- Hanyu Pinyin: Shātián Zhèn

Shatian is a town located in Fengshun County, Guangdong Province, China.

== See also ==
- List of township-level divisions of Guangdong
