= Fengshun County =

Fengshun 丰顺县 Fungshun
- County
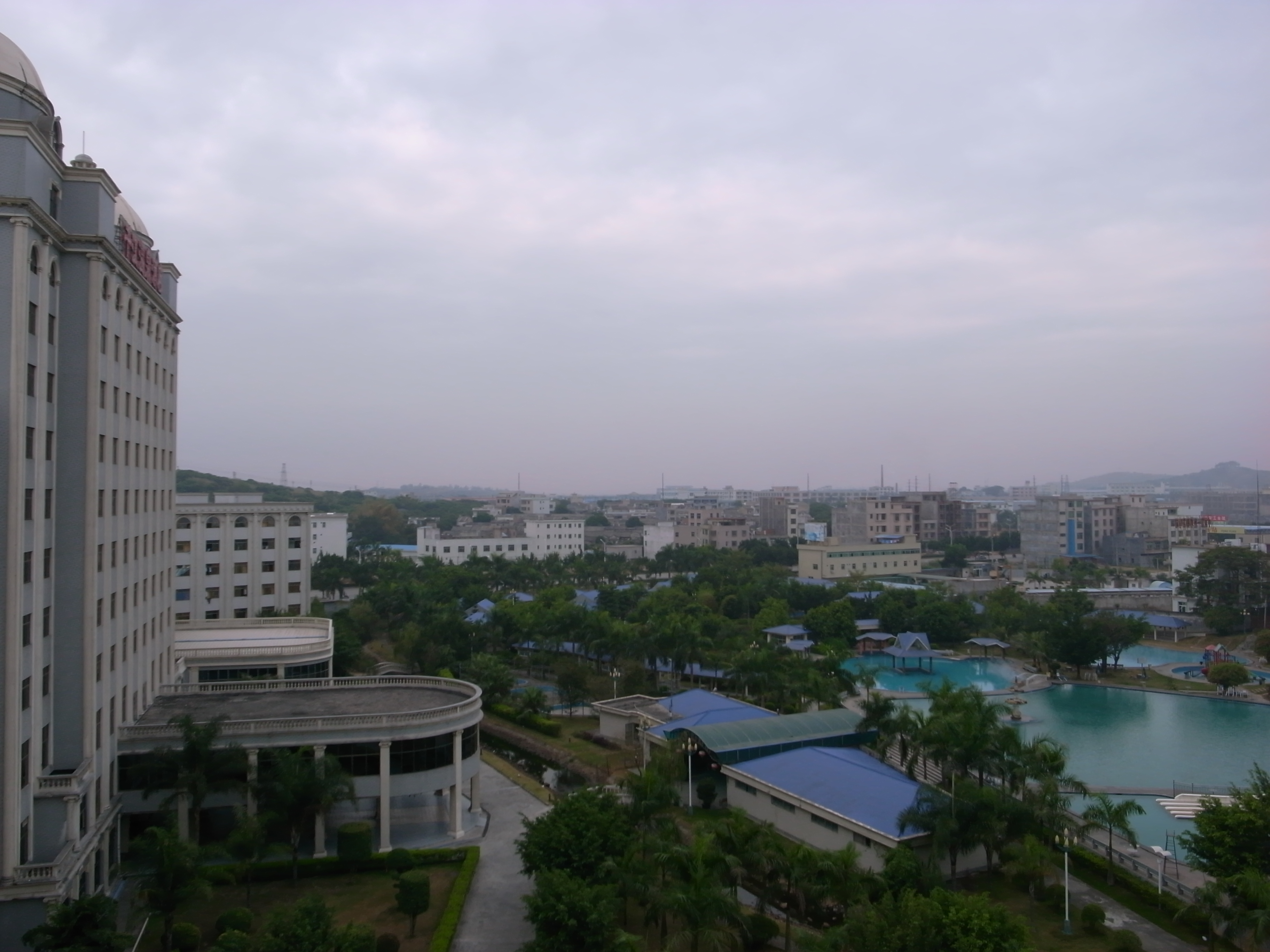

- Location of Fengshun County in Meizhou City and Guangdong province

- Location of the seat in Guangdong
- Coordinates: 23.740°N 116.183°E
- Country: People's Republic of China
- Province: Guangdong
- Prefecture-level city: Meizhou

Area
  - Total: 2,710 km^{2} (1,050 sq mi)

Population (2020 census)
  - Total: 478,731
  - Density: 177/km^{2} (458/sq mi)
- Time zone: UTC+8 (China Standard)
- Website: www.fengshun.gov.cn

Fengshun (postal: Fungshun or Pungshan; simplified Chinese: 丰顺县; traditional Chinese: 豐順縣; pinyin: Fēngshùn Xiàn) is a county located in eastern Guangdong Province, China, and falls under the administration of Meizhou City. Historically, it was one of the eight counties of ancient Chaozhou (潮州八邑). It borders Chao’an District of Chaozhou City to the east; Jiedong District and Jiexi County of Jieyang City to the south; Wuhua County and Xingning City to the west; and Meixian District, Meijiang District, and Dapu County to the north.

Fengshun County covers an area of 2,706.34 square kilometers. It administers 16 towns, one state‑owned farm, 261 administrative villages, 20 urban communities, and two management zones. The total population is 734,000, with a permanent resident population of 479,000.

== History ==
Fengshun County was established in the third year of Qianlong reign of the Qing Dynasty (1738). It was placed under the jurisdiction of Chaozhou Prefecture at that time. From 1988, it is placed under the jurisdiction of Meizhou City.

== Ethno-linguistic make-up ==
Fengshun is characterized by a predominantly Hakka population. Most residents speak Hakka, while Teochew constitutes the region’s second major linguistic group, reflecting the county’s position at the cultural crossroads of Hakka and Chaoshan traditions.

Fengshun’s distinctive geographic position has fostered a deep integration of Chaoshan culture and Hakka culture, giving rise to a unique regional identity often referred to as "Chao‑Hakka" (潮客) culture. Within the county, Hakka and Chaoshan communities coexist harmoniously, shaping what is known as the “half‑mountain Hakka” (半山客) cultural tradition.

The region is also home to Guangdong’s characteristic She ethnic culture, as well as the famous Puzhai (埔寨) "Fire Dragon" festival (燒火龍).

== Administrative divisions ==
Fengshun County's executive, legislature and judiciary are based in Tangkeng (汤坑镇), along with its CPC and PSB branches. The county is responsible for the administration of 16 towns and one Township Enterprise.

Towns

- Baxiangshan (八乡山镇)
- Beidou (北斗镇)
- Dalonghua (大龙华镇)
- Fengliang (丰良镇)
- Huangjin (黄金镇)
- Jianqiao (建桥镇)
- Liuhuang (留隍镇)
- Longgang (龙岗镇)
- Pantian (潘田镇)
- Puzhai (埔寨镇)
- Shatian (砂田镇)
- Tanjiang (潭江镇)
- Tangkeng (汤坑镇)
- Tangnan (汤南镇)
- Tangxi (汤西镇)
- Xiaosheng (小胜镇)

Township enterprise

- Puzhai Farm (埔寨农场)

== Transport ==
The area is served by Fengshun railway station on the Guangzhou–Meizhou–Shantou railway and Fengshun East railway station on the Meizhou–Chaoshan high-speed railway.

== Climate ==
Climate data for Fengshun, elevation 45 m (148 ft), (1991–2020 normals, extremes 1962–2010)
Month	Jan	Feb	Mar	Apr	May	Jun	Jul	Aug	Sep	Oct	Nov	Dec	Year
Record high °C (°F)	29.9 (85.8)	31.1 (88.0)	34.1 (93.4)	36.0 (96.8)	36.6 (97.9)	37.8 (100.0)	39.2 (102.6)	39.1 (102.4)	37.2 (99.0)	35.5 (95.9)	34.6 (94.3)	31.8 (89.2)	39.2 (102.6)
Mean daily maximum °C (°F)	19.5 (67.1)	20.3 (68.5)	22.5 (72.5)	26.3 (79.3)	29.4 (84.9)	31.6 (88.9)	33.5 (92.3)	33.3 (91.9)	32.2 (90.0)	29.6 (85.3)	26.0 (78.8)	21.4 (70.5)	27.1 (80.8)
Daily mean °C (°F)	14.1 (57.4)	15.3 (59.5)	17.8 (64.0)	21.7 (71.1)	25.0 (77.0)	27.3 (81.1)	28.5 (83.3)	28.2 (82.8)	27.2 (81.0)	24.2 (75.6)	20.2 (68.4)	15.7 (60.3)	22.1 (71.8)
Mean daily minimum °C (°F)	10.4 (50.7)	11.9 (53.4)	14.5 (58.1)	18.4 (65.1)	21.9 (71.4)	24.4 (75.9)	25.0 (77.0)	24.8 (76.6)	23.7 (74.7)	20.3 (68.5)	16.3 (61.3)	11.8 (53.2)	18.6 (65.5)
Record low °C (°F)	−1.9 (28.6)	1.9 (35.4)	2.1 (35.8)	9.0 (48.2)	13.6 (56.5)	17.4 (63.3)	21.1 (70.0)	20.7 (69.3)	16.5 (61.7)	10.6 (51.1)	3.9 (39.0)	−0.4 (31.3)	−1.9 (28.6)
Average precipitation mm (inches)	40.6 (1.60)	58.8 (2.31)	114.6 (4.51)	162.3 (6.39)	221.6 (8.72)	330.2 (13.00)	296.0 (11.65)	299.3 (11.78)	190.0 (7.48)	45.2 (1.78)	35.8 (1.41)	38.2 (1.50)	1,832.6 (72.13)
Average precipitation days (≥ 0.1 mm)	7.1	10.8	14.4	15.2	18.4	20.3	17.8	18.8	12.7	5.5	5.3	6.4	152.7
Average relative humidity (%)	73	77	79	80	82	84	81	81	78	73	72	70	78
Mean monthly sunshine hours	146.2	103.0	94.7	102.9	127.1	143.1	210.6	193.2	191.3	200.5	175.5	165.3	1,853.4
Percentage possible sunshine	44	32	25	27	31	35	51	48	52	56	54	50	42
Source: China Meteorological Administrationall-time record lowest temperature and all-time August temperature

== Notable Figures ==
- Joseph Ting Sun Pao (丁新豹), Hong Kong historian, also an honourable professor of Hong Kong University.
