= Tangkeng =

Town in Guangdong, China

Coordinates: 23.7427°N 116.1872°E

- Simplified Chinese: 汤坑镇
Transcriptions
Standard Mandarin
- Hanyu Pinyin: Tāngkēng Zhèn

Tangkeng is a town located in Fengshun County, Meizhou City, Guangdong Province, China.

== See also ==
- List of township-level divisions of Guangdong
- Battle of Shantou, in 1927.
