= Puzhai Farm =

Coordinates: 23.6409°N 116.1268°E

- Simplified Chinese: 埔寨农场
Transcriptions
Standard Mandarin
- Hanyu Pinyin: Pǔzhài Nóngchǎng

Puzhai Farm is a township enterprise located south of Puzhai Town in Fengshun County, Meizhou City, Guangdong Province, China.

== See also ==
- List of township-level divisions of Guangdong
