= Fengliang =

Town in Guangdong, China

Coordinates: 23.9556°N 116.1980°E

- Simplified Chinese: 丰良镇
Transcriptions
Standard Mandarin
- Hanyu Pinyin: Fēngliáng Zhèn

Fengliang is a town located in Fengshun County, Meizhou City, Guangdong Province, China.

== See also ==
- List of township-level divisions of Guangdong
