= Longgang, Fengshun County =

Town in Fengshun County, Guangdong, China

Coordinates: 23.9938°N 116.2389°E

- Simplified Chinese: 龙岗镇
Transcriptions
Standard Mandarin
- Hanyu Pinyin: Lónggǎng Zhèn

Longgang is a town located in Fengshun County, Meizhou City, Guangdong Province, China.

== See also ==
- List of township-level divisions of Guangdong
