= Xin'an Subdistrict, Shenzhen =

Xin'an Subdistrict 新安街道
- Subdistrict

Chinese transcription(s)
  - Chinese: 新安街道
  - Pinyin: Xīn'ān Jiēdào
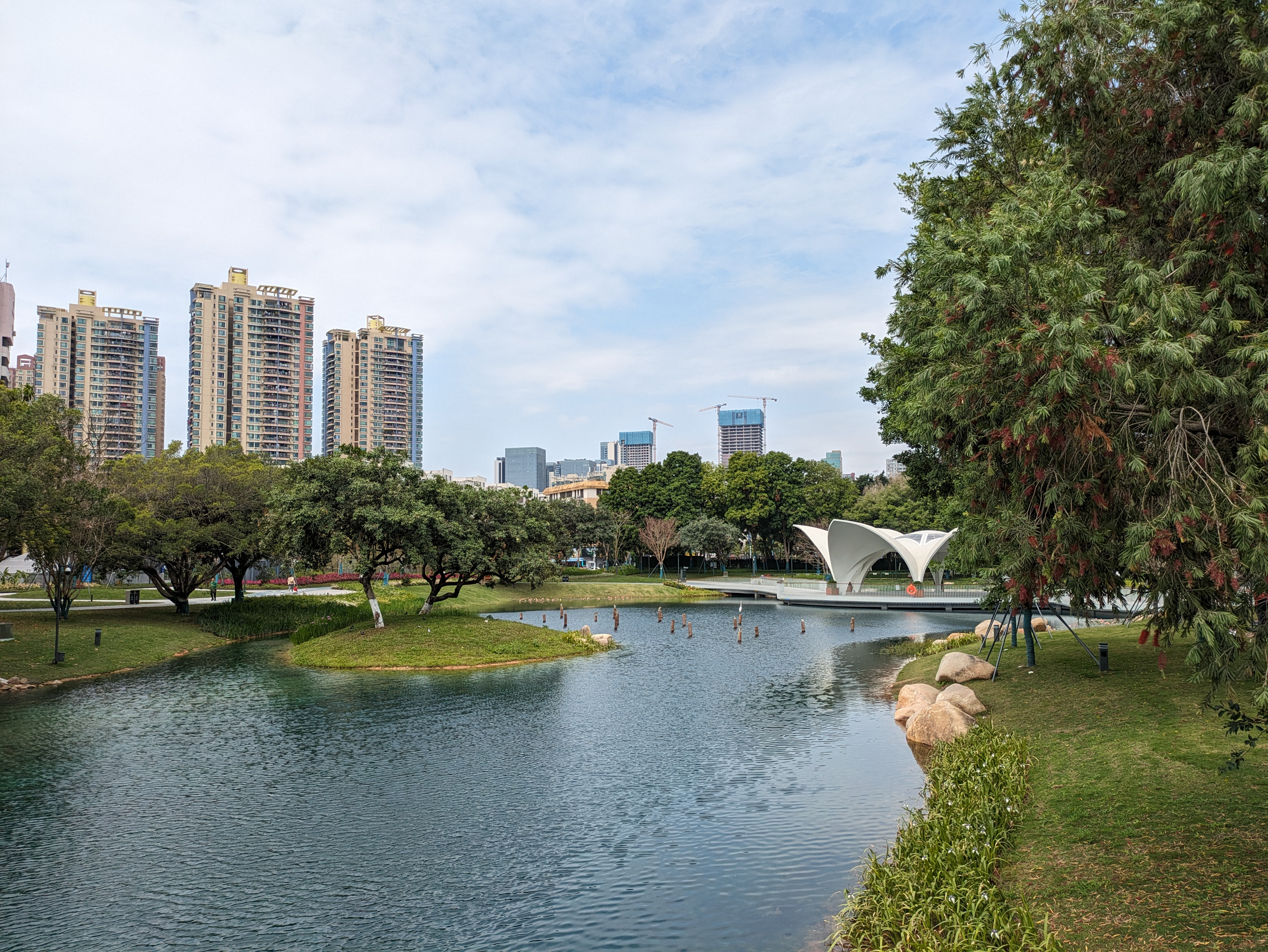
- Xin'an Park in 2024
- Interactive map of Xin'an Subdistrict
- Coordinates: 22.5658°N 113.8937°E
- Country: China
- Province: Guangdong
- Prefecture: Shenzhen
- District: Bao'an
- Constructed: 1994

Government
  - Type: Subdistrict-level

Area
  - Total: 30.9 km^{2} (11.9 sq mi)

Population
  - Total: 660,000
  - Density: 21,000/km^{2} (55,000/sq mi)
- Time zone: UTC+8 (China Standard Time)

Xin'an Subdistrict (Chinese: 新安街道; pinyin: Xīn'ān Jiēdào) is a subdistrict of the Bao'an District, Shenzhen, Guangdong, China.

== Demographics ==
The total population in the subdistrict is 660,000 people, with a registered population of 160,000.

== Government ==
There are 22 residential communities.

== Economy ==
There are as many as 8,000 commercial venues, and 1,000 manufacturing enterprises.

== See also ==
- List of township-level divisions of Guangdong
