= Sanpai =

Coordinates: 34°48′N 104°19′E

Sanpai 三排镇
- Town

Chinese transcription(s)
- Interactive map of Sanpai
- Country: China
- Province: Guangdong
- Prefecture: Qingyuan
- Time zone: UTC+8 (China Standard Time)

Sanpai (simplified Chinese: 三排镇; traditional Chinese: 三排鎮; pinyin: Sānpái zhèn) is a township-level division situated in Qingyuan, Guangdong, China.

== See also ==
- List of township-level divisions of Guangdong
