= Caijiayu Township =

Caijiayu Township 蔡家峪乡
- Rural Township
- Càijiāyù Xiāng
- Location in Hebei Location in China
- Coordinates: 39°29′19″N 115°05′05″E
- Country: People's Republic of China
- Province: Hebei
- Prefecture-level city: Baoding
- County: Yi

Area
  - Total: 71.76 km^{2} (27.71 sq mi)

Population (2010)
  - Total: 2,564
  - Density: 35.73/km^{2} (92.5/sq mi)
- Time zone: UTC+8 (China Standard)

Caijiayu Township (Chinese: 蔡家峪乡; pinyin: Càijiāyù Xiāng) is a rural township located in Yi County, Baoding, Hebei, China. According to the 2010 census, Caijiayu Township had a population of 2,564, including 1,377 males and 1,187 females. The population was distributed as follows: 358 people aged under 14, 1,881 people aged between 15 and 64, and 325 people aged over 65.

== See also ==
- List of township-level divisions of Hebei
