= Lixi, Guangdong =

Coordinates: 23.9395°N 113.2595°E

Lixi, Yingde
- Subdistrict

Chinese transcription(s)
- Interactive map of Lixi, Yingde
- Country: China
- Province: Guangdong
- Prefecture: Qingyuan
- Time zone: UTC+8 (China Standard Time)

Lixi (Chinese: 黎溪镇) is a town in Yingde City, Qingyuan, north Guangdong Province, China.

== See also ==
- List of township-level divisions of Guangdong
