= Langyashan =

Langyashan 狼牙山镇
- Town
- Location in Hebei
- Coordinates: 39°05′25″N 115°08′00″E
- Country: People's Republic of China
- Province: Hebei
- Prefecture-level city: Baoding
- County: Yi
- Village-level divisions: 20 villages
- Elevation: 170 m (560 ft)
- Time zone: UTC+8 (China Standard)
- Area code: 0312

Langyashan (Chinese: 狼牙山; pinyin: Lángyáshān), named after the nearby Mount Langya (狼牙山), is a town of Yi County in southwestern Hebei province, China, located in the Taihang Mountains 42 kilometres (26 mi) southwest of the county seat. As of 2011, it has 20 villages under its administration.

== See also ==
- List of township-level divisions of Hebei
