= Tangnan, Guangdong =

Town in Fengshun County, Guangdong, China

Coordinates: 23.7256°N 116.2099°E

- Simplified Chinese: 汤南镇
Transcriptions
Standard Mandarin
- Hanyu Pinyin: Tāngnán Zhèn

Tangnan is a town located in Fengshun County, Meizhou City, Guangdong Province, China.

== See also ==
- List of township-level divisions of Guangdong
