= Aiguo Subdistrict, Zhanjiang =

Aiguo Subdistrict 爱国街道
- Subdistrict
- Location in Guangdong
- Coordinates: 21.184572°N 110.411267°E
- Country: China
- Province: Guangdong
- Prefecture: Zhanjiang
- District: Xiashan District
- Time zone: UTC+8 (China Standard Time)

Aiguo Subdistrict (Chinese: 爱国街道; pinyin: Àiguó Jiēdào) is a township-level division situated in Xiashan District of Zhanjiang, Guangdong, China. As of 2020, it administers Techeng Village (特呈村) and the following five residential neighborhoods:

- Huanhu Community (环湖社区)
- Renmindong Community (人民东社区)
- Hongwu Community (洪屋社区)
- Dongdi Community (东堤社区)
- Hankou Community (汉口社区)

== See also ==
- List of township-level divisions of Guangdong
