= Ganhejing Township =

Ganhejing Township 甘河净乡
- Rural Township
- Gānhéjìng Xiāng
- Location in Hebei Location in China
- Coordinates: 39°10′30″N 114°56′32″E
- Country: People's Republic of China
- Province: Hebei
- Prefecture-level city: Baoding
- County: Yi

Area
  - Total: 60.32 km^{2} (23.29 sq mi)

Population (2010)
  - Total: 1,524
  - Density: 25.27/km^{2} (65.4/sq mi)
- Time zone: UTC+8 (China Standard)

Ganhejing Township (Chinese: 甘河净乡; pinyin: Gānhéjìng Xiāng) is a rural township located in Yi County, Baoding, Hebei, China. According to the 2010 census, Ganhejing Township had a population of 1,524, including 855 males and 669 females. The population was distributed as follows: 177 people aged under 14, 1,113 people aged between 15 and 64, and 234 people aged over 65.

== See also ==
- List of township-level divisions of Hebei
