= Chengbei Township, Guangdong =

Chengbei Township 城北乡
- Township
- Location in Guangdong
- Coordinates: 20°20′03″N 110°10′10″E
- Country: People's Republic of China
- Province: Guangdong
- Prefecture-level city: Zhanjiang
- County: Xuwen
- Elevation: 72 m (236 ft)
- Time zone: UTC+8 (China Standard)
- Postal code: 524100
- Area code: 0759

Chengbei Township (Chinese: 城北乡; pinyin: Chéngběi Xiāng; Jyutping: sing^{4}bak^{1}; lit. 'city north') is a township of Xuwen County in far southwestern Guangdong province, China, situated adjacent to the county seat. As of 2011, it has 14 villages under its administration.

== See also ==
- List of township-level divisions of Guangdong
