= Pantian =

Town in Fengshun, Meizhou, Guangdong, China

Coordinates: 23.9175°N 116.3253°E

- Simplified Chinese: 潘田镇
Transcriptions
Standard Mandarin
- Hanyu Pinyin: Pāntián Zhèn

Pantian is a town located in Fengshun County, Meizhou City, Guangdong Province, China.

== See also ==
- List of township-level divisions of Guangdong
