= Angezhuang Township =

Angezhuang Township 安格庄乡
- Rural Township
- Āngézhuāng Xiāng
- Location in Hebei Location in China
- Coordinates: 39°17′20″N 115°14′19″E
- Country: People's Republic of China
- Province: Hebei
- Prefecture-level city: Baoding
- County: Yi

Area
  - Total: 88.32 km^{2} (34.10 sq mi)

Population (2010)
  - Total: 10,364
  - Density: 117.4/km^{2} (304/sq mi)
- Time zone: UTC+8 (China Standard)

Angezhuang Township (Chinese: 安格庄乡; pinyin: Āngézhuāng Xiāng) is a rural township located in Yi County, Baoding, Hebei, China. According to the 2010 census, Angezhuang Township had a population of 10,364, including 5,317 males and 5,047 females. The population was distributed as follows: 1,738 people aged under 14, 7,609 people aged between 15 and 64, and 1,017 people aged over 65.

== See also ==
- List of township-level divisions of Hebei
