= Longtou, Guangdong =

Longtou 龙头镇
- Town
- Location in Guangdong
- Coordinates: 21°21′33″N 110°31′17″E
- Country: People's Republic of China
- Province: Guangdong
- Prefecture-level city: Zhanjiang
- District: Potou
- Village-level divisions: 1 residential community 11 villages
- Elevation: 39 m (128 ft)
- Time zone: UTC+8 (China Standard)
- Area code: 0759

Longtou (simplified Chinese: 龙头; traditional Chinese: 龍頭; pinyin: Lóngtóu; Jyutping: lung^{4}tau^{4}; lit. 'dragon head (faucet)') is a town of Potou District, Zhanjiang, in southwestern Guangdong province, China. As of 2011, it has one residential community (社区) and 11 villages under its administration. It is served by China National Highway 325, which provides the town with direct access to downtown Zhanjiang.

== See also ==
- List of township-level divisions of Guangdong
