= Fengshun East railway station =

Railway station in Meizhou, Guangdong

Fengshun East 丰顺东

General information
- Location: Fengshun County, Meizhou, Guangdong; China
- Coordinates: 23°48′18.5″N 116°11′8.31″E
- Line: Meizhou–Chaoshan high-speed railway

History
- Opened: 11 October 2019
Location

Fengshun East railway station (Chinese: 丰顺东站) is a railway station in Fengshun County, Meizhou, Guangdong, China. It is an intermediate stop on the Meizhou–Chaoshan high-speed railway. It opened with the line on 11 October 2019.

== See also ==
- Fengshun railway station
