= Hedong, Lianshan County =

Hedong 禾洞镇
- Town
- Location in Guangdong
- Coordinates: 24°45′49″N 112°04′54″E
- Country: People's Republic of China
- Province: Guangdong
- Prefecture-level city: Qingyuan
- Autonomous county: Lianshan
- Village-level divisions: 4 villages
- Elevation: 488 m (1,601 ft)
- Time zone: UTC+8 (China Standard)
- Area code: 0763

Hedong (Chinese: 禾洞; pinyin: Hédòng) is a town of Lianshan Zhuang and Yao Autonomous County in northwestern Guangdong province, China, located about 3.5 kilometres (2.2 mi) southeast of the border with Hunan and 21 km (13 mi) north of the county seat. As of 2018, it has four villages under its administration.

== See also ==
- List of township-level divisions of Guangdong
