= Tangxi, Fengshun County =

Town in Guangdong, China

Coordinates: 23.7601°N 116.1575°E

- Simplified Chinese: 汤西镇
Transcriptions
Standard Mandarin
- Hanyu Pinyin: Tāngxi Zhèn

Tangxi is a town located in Fengshun County, Meizhou City, Guangdong Province, China.

== See also ==
- List of township-level divisions of Guangdong
