= Dalonghua Township =

Dalonghua Township 大龙华乡
- Township
- Location in Hebei
- Coordinates: 39°19′26″N 115°15′23″E
- Country: People's Republic of China
- Province: Hebei
- Prefecture-level city: Baoding
- County: Yi County
- Time zone: UTC+8 (China Standard)

Dalonghua Township (simplified Chinese: 大龙华乡; traditional Chinese: 大龍華鄉; pinyin: Dàlónghuá Xiāng) is a township under the administration of Yi County, Hebei, China. As of 2018, it has 18 villages under its administration.
