= Sankeng (slang) =

Chinese subculture fashion slang

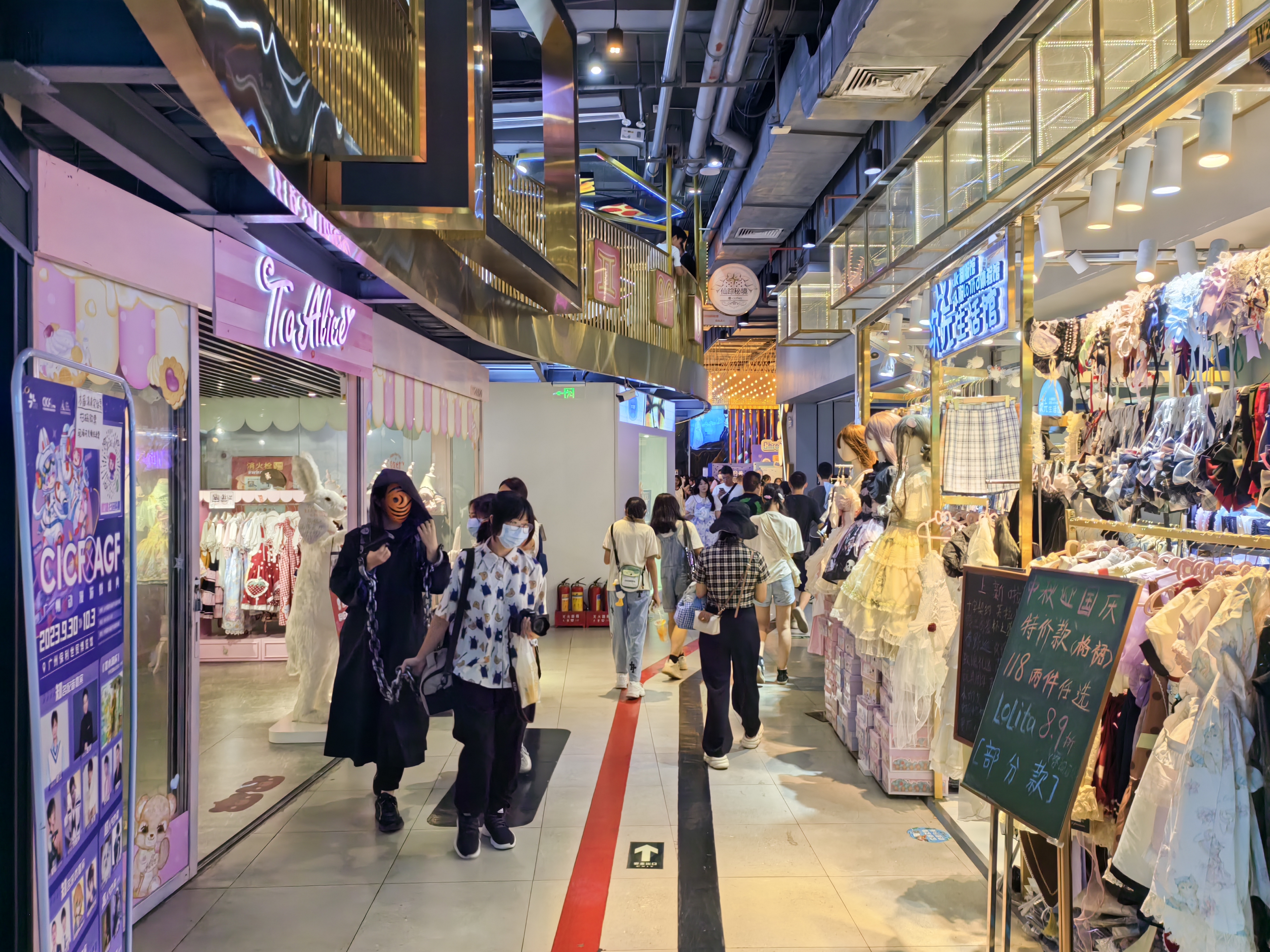
Japanese school uniform, hanfu and Lolita fashion shops in Guangzhou

The sankeng (Chinese: 三坑; pinyin: Sānkēng; lit. 'Three traps') is a Chinese subculture slang for three types of fashion, Japanese school uniforms, hanfu and Lolita fashion, which were called "traps" due to the addiction of Chinese Gen Z consumers to them. Women within the subculture are called "Sankeng Girl" (Chinese: 三坑少女; pinyin: Sānkēng shàonǚ) or "Three Bankrupt Sisters" (Chinese: 破产三姐妹; pinyin: Pòchǎn Sānjiěmèi).

== Description ==
Sankeng clothing are called "traps" due to their high prices and rapidly changing trends, as well as the high cost needed to research them. ACGN fans aged 12 to 35 are the primary demographic of this subculture. In a survey in 2021, 21.7% of respondents stated that they are attracted to relevant ACGN cultures, prolonging their retention for passion.

Sankeng physical stores exhibits slow and dispersed development. An article in The Paper thought that Japanese school uniform, hanfu and Lolita fashion stores cannot be operated in the same way, increasing the difficulty of managing sankeng stores.

== Terminology ==
The sankeng girls are categorized into "single trap", "double traps", and "three traps" based on their preferences for these types of clothes, and consumers who do not know any types of clothing from sankeng are referred to as "earthmen". Besides, every clothing in sankeng has its own terminology, such as the term "dog short", "honor student" and "furyō" being used to describe the length of JK uniform skirts, and "jsk" (jumper skirt) and "op" (one piece) referring to sleeveless and sleeved Lolita dresses respectively.

== Influence ==
In the 2020s, the sankeng fashion is one of the most popular street fashions in China. According to a report by Guotai Junan Securities, sankeng clothing sales has exceeded 20 billion yuan in 2020, and it predicts that sales will reach 126.6 billion yuan by 2025. LeadLeo Research Institute predicted the total market size of the "sankeng" industry is expected to reach 103.5 billion yuan by 2025.
