= Jiangwan, Guangdong =

Coordinates: 24.6258°N 113.22574°E

Jiangwan, Shaoguan
- Subdistrict

Chinese transcription(s)
- Interactive map of Jiangwan, Shaoguan
- Country: China
- Province: Guangdong
- Prefecture: Shaoguan
- Time zone: UTC+8 (China Standard Time)

Jiangwan, Shaoguan (Chinese: 江湾镇) is a township-level division situated in Shaoguan, Guangdong, China.

== See also ==
- List of township-level divisions of Guangdong
