= Dalonghua, Guangdong =

Dalonghua 大龙华镇
- Town
- Location in Guangdong
- Coordinates: 24°03′27″N 116°19′18″E
- Country: People's Republic of China
- Province: Guangdong
- Prefecture-level city: Meizhou
- County: Fengshun County
- Time zone: UTC+8 (China Standard)

Dalonghua (simplified Chinese: 大龙华; traditional Chinese: 大龍華; pinyin: Dàlónghuá) is a town located in Fengshun County, Meizhou City, Guangdong Province, China. As of 2018, it has 16 villages under its administration.

== See also ==
- List of township-level divisions of Guangdong
