= Qingzhou, Guangdong =

Town in Guangdong, China

Qingzhou Town 青州镇
- Interactive map of Qingzhou Town
- Coordinates: 24.3568°N 114.8040°E

Population (2010)
  - Total: 9,038
- Time zone: UTC+8 (CT)

Qingzhou (青州镇) is a town in Heping County, Guangdong, China. With a population of 9,038 as of 2010.

== Administrative divisions ==
Qingzhou Town administers the following village-level administrative divisions: Street Community, Xinghe, Xingxing, Xinglian, Xingtang, Yongfeng, Xianfeng, Chuanbu, Xinjian, Piantian, and Shantang.
