= Huangjin, Guangdong =

Settlement in China

Coordinates: 23.9895°N 116.3868°E

- Simplified Chinese: 黄金镇
Transcriptions
Standard Mandarin
- Hanyu Pinyin: Huángjīn Zhèn

Huangjin is a town located in Fengshun County, Meizhou City, Guangdong Province, China.

== See also ==
- List of township-level divisions of Guangdong
