= Qujie =

Town in Guangdong, China

Coordinates: 20.487564°N 110.326639°E

Qujie (Chinese: t 曲界鎮, s 曲界镇, p Qūjiè Zhèn) is a town on southern China's Leizhou Peninsula southeast of the dormant Tianyang volcano. It is part of Zhanjiang's Xuwen County in Guangdong province.
