= Xieji, Guangdong =

Xieji 谢鸡镇
- Town
- Location in Guangdong
- Coordinates: 21°55′15″N 110°59′07″E
- Country: People's Republic of China
- Province: Guangdong
- Prefecture-level city: Maoming
- County-level city: Gaozhou
- Village-level divisions: 1 residential community 19 villages
- Elevation: 74 m (243 ft)
- Time zone: UTC+8 (China Standard)
- Area code: 0668

Xieji (simplified Chinese: 谢鸡; traditional Chinese: 謝雞; pinyin: Xièjī; Jyutping: ze^{6}gai^{1}) is a town under the administration of Gaozhou City in southwestern Guangdong province, China, located about 14 kilometres (8.7 mi) east of downtown Gaozhou. As of 2011, it has one residential community (居委会) and 19 villages under its administration.

== See also ==
- List of township-level divisions of Guangdong
