= Yuxin Subdistrict =

Coordinates: 23.26966°N 116.66832°E

Yuxin Subdistrict 玉新街道
- Subdistrict

Chinese transcription(s)
- Interactive map of Yuxin Subdistrict
- Country: China
- Province: Guangdong
- Prefecture: Shantou
- District: Haojiang
- Time zone: UTC+8 (China Standard Time)

Yuxin Subdistrict (Chinese: 玉新街道; pinyin: yùxīn jiēdào) is a township-level division situated in Haojiang District, Shantou, Guangdong, China.

== See also ==
- List of township-level divisions of Guangdong
