= Yury Cheban =

Transnistrian politician

Yury Mikhailovich Cheban (Russian: Юрий Михайлович Чебан; born 27 January 1958) is a Transnistrian politician, who was the head (Minister) of the Ministry of Natural Resources and Ecological Control of Transnistria from 1994 to 2006. Yury Cheban was born in Hîncești and raised in Tiraspol, today the capital of Transnistria. Currently, Yury Cheban is working as President of the Union of Industrialists, Agrarians and Entrepreneurs of Pridnestrovie (SPAPP) which is responsible mostly for uniting representatives of large and medium business, as well as the Coordinator of the Pridnestrovian People's Forum

In 2023, Yury Cheban was presented the Order of Merit by President Vadim Krasnoselsky for his leadership of SPAPP.
