= Nantang, Gaozhou =

Coordinates: 22.06121°N 110.78838°E

Nantang 南塘
- Subdistrict

Chinese transcription(s)
- Interactive map of Nantang
- Country: China
- Province: Guangdong
- Prefecture: Maoming
- County-level city: Gaozhou
- Time zone: UTC+8 (China Standard Time)

Nantang (Chinese: 南塘; pinyin: Nántáng) is a township-level division situated in Gaozhou, Maoming, Guangdong, China.

== See also ==
- List of township-level divisions of Guangdong
