= Liuhuang, Guangdong =

Town in China

Coordinates: 23.9132°N 116.4651°E

- Simplified Chinese: 留隍镇
Transcriptions
Standard Mandarin
- Hanyu Pinyin: Liúhuáng Zhèn

Liuhuang is a town located in Fengshun County, Meizhou City, Guangdong Province, China.

== See also ==
- List of township-level divisions of Guangdong
