= Jianqiao, Guangdong =

Jianqiao
- Town

Chinese transcription(s)
  - Characters: 建桥镇
  - Pinyin: Jiànqiáo Zhèn
- Location in China
- Coordinates: 23°57′2″N 116°8′50″E
- Country: China
- Province: Guangdong
- Prefecture: Meizhou
- County: Fengshun County

Area
  - Total: 94.1 km^{2} (36.3 sq mi)

Population
  - Total: 28,763
  - Density: 306/km^{2} (792/sq mi)
- Time zone: UTC+8 (China Standard)
- Postal code: 514348
- Area code: 0753

Jianqiao is a town located in Fengshun County, Meizhou City, Guangdong Province, China. It has an area of 94.1 square kilometers and a population of 28,763.

== See also ==
- List of township-level divisions of Guangdong
