= Xiaosheng, Guangdong =

Xiaosheng 小胜镇
- Town
- Location in Guangdong
- Coordinates: 24°03′51″N 116°27′34″E
- Country: People's Republic of China
- Province: Guangdong
- Prefecture-level city: Meizhou
- County: Fengshun County
- Time zone: UTC+8 (China Standard)

Xiaosheng (simplified Chinese: 小胜; traditional Chinese: 小勝; pinyin: Xiǎoshèng) is a town located in Fengshun County, Meizhou City, Guangdong Province, China. As of 2020, it has 11 villages under its administration:

- Xiaosheng Village
- Zhongshe Village (中社村)
- Danan Village (大南村)
- Tianbei Village (田背村)
- Tianmianjiao Village (田面角村)
- Sankeng Village (三坑村)
- Heping Village (荷坪村)
- Zhukeng Village (朱坑村)
- Danzhu Village (丹竹村)
- Zaixia Village (再下村)
- Xiaoxi Village (小溪村)

== See also ==
- List of township-level divisions of Guangdong
