= Xinfeng County, Guangdong =

Xinfeng 新丰县 Sunfung
- County
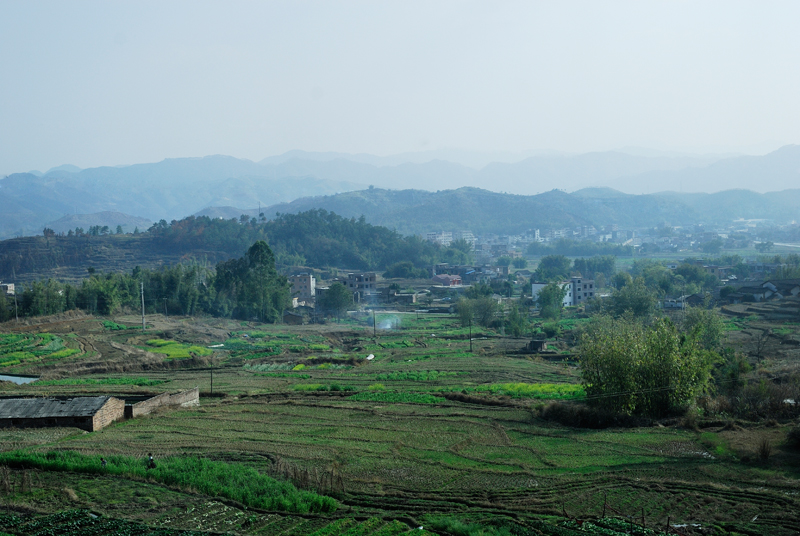

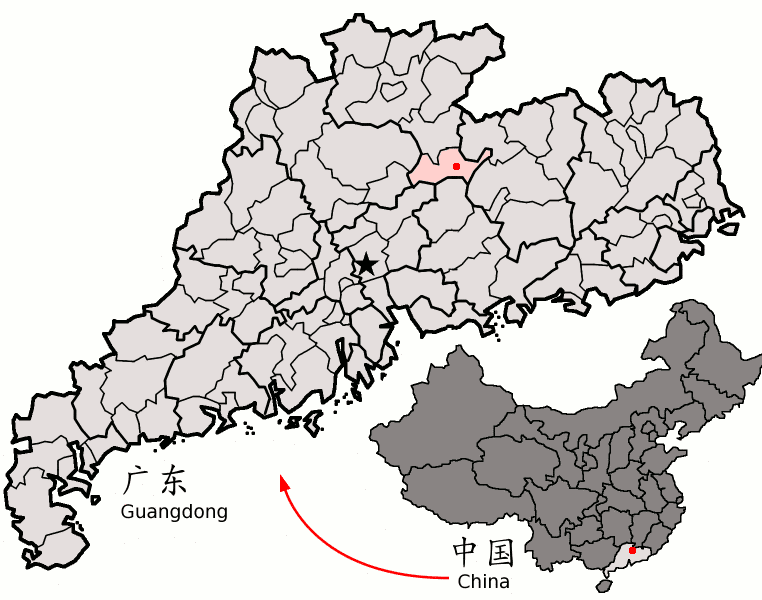
- Location in Guangdong
- Coordinates: 24°03′36″N 114°12′25″E
- Country: People's Republic of China
- Province: Guangdong
- Prefecture-level city: Shaoguan

Area
  - Total: 1,987 km^{2} (767 sq mi)

Population (2020)
  - Total: 195,430
  - Density: 98.35/km^{2} (254.7/sq mi)
- Time zone: UTC+8 (China Standard)

Xinfeng County (postal: Sunfung or Sinfeng; simplified Chinese: 新丰县; traditional Chinese: 新豐縣; pinyin: Xīnfēng Xiàn) is a county in the northeast of Guangdong Province, China. It is the southernmost county-level division of the prefecture-level city of Shaoguan.

== Climate ==
Climate data for Xinfeng, elevation 269 m (883 ft), (1991–2020 normals, extremes 1981–2010)
| Month | Jan | Feb | Mar | Apr | May | Jun | Jul | Aug | Sep | Oct | Nov | Dec | Year |
|---|---|---|---|---|---|---|---|---|---|---|---|---|---|
| Record high °C (°F) | 28.4 (83.1) | 30.8 (87.4) | 33.0 (91.4) | 33.7 (92.7) | 35.6 (96.1) | 37.2 (99.0) | 38.3 (100.9) | 37.9 (100.2) | 37.0 (98.6) | 35.8 (96.4) | 34.4 (93.9) | 29.5 (85.1) | 38.3 (100.9) |
| Mean daily maximum °C (°F) | 17.4 (63.3) | 18.9 (66.0) | 21.0 (69.8) | 25.4 (77.7) | 28.9 (84.0) | 31.0 (87.8) | 32.9 (91.2) | 32.8 (91.0) | 31.0 (87.8) | 28.2 (82.8) | 24.2 (75.6) | 19.3 (66.7) | 25.9 (78.6) |
| Daily mean °C (°F) | 11.6 (52.9) | 13.6 (56.5) | 16.5 (61.7) | 21.0 (69.8) | 24.3 (75.7) | 26.4 (79.5) | 27.5 (81.5) | 27.2 (81.0) | 25.5 (77.9) | 21.9 (71.4) | 17.6 (63.7) | 12.8 (55.0) | 20.5 (68.9) |
| Mean daily minimum °C (°F) | 7.7 (45.9) | 10.0 (50.0) | 13.3 (55.9) | 17.9 (64.2) | 21.3 (70.3) | 23.5 (74.3) | 24.1 (75.4) | 24.0 (75.2) | 22.0 (71.6) | 17.6 (63.7) | 13.2 (55.8) | 8.5 (47.3) | 16.9 (62.5) |
| Record low °C (°F) | −2.8 (27.0) | −1.2 (29.8) | −0.2 (31.6) | 6.8 (44.2) | 11.7 (53.1) | 14.2 (57.6) | 19.5 (67.1) | 20.1 (68.2) | 13.1 (55.6) | 5.7 (42.3) | 0.2 (32.4) | −5.3 (22.5) | −5.3 (22.5) |
| Average precipitation mm (inches) | 63.2 (2.49) | 69.9 (2.75) | 160.3 (6.31) | 218.6 (8.61) | 271.5 (10.69) | 391.4 (15.41) | 220.9 (8.70) | 233.4 (9.19) | 147.2 (5.80) | 42.3 (1.67) | 45.3 (1.78) | 47.8 (1.88) | 1,911.8 (75.28) |
| Average precipitation days (≥ 0.1 mm) | 8.9 | 11.7 | 17.6 | 17.7 | 19.3 | 20.7 | 17.5 | 17.5 | 12.5 | 5.8 | 6.6 | 6.6 | 162.4 |
| Average snowy days | 0.1 | 0.2 | 0 | 0 | 0 | 0 | 0 | 0 | 0 | 0 | 0 | 0 | 0.3 |
| Average relative humidity (%) | 75 | 79 | 83 | 83 | 85 | 86 | 82 | 83 | 82 | 76 | 75 | 73 | 80 |
| Mean monthly sunshine hours | 108.5 | 77.2 | 63.6 | 69.1 | 90.3 | 106.8 | 165.6 | 159.8 | 155.8 | 171.3 | 152.3 | 146.5 | 1,466.8 |
| Percentage possible sunshine | 32 | 24 | 17 | 18 | 22 | 26 | 40 | 40 | 43 | 48 | 47 | 44 | 33 |
Source: China Meteorological Administration
