= Han River (Guangdong) =

River in Guangdong, China

Coordinates: 24.05054°N 116.532669°E

Han River Hán Jiāng
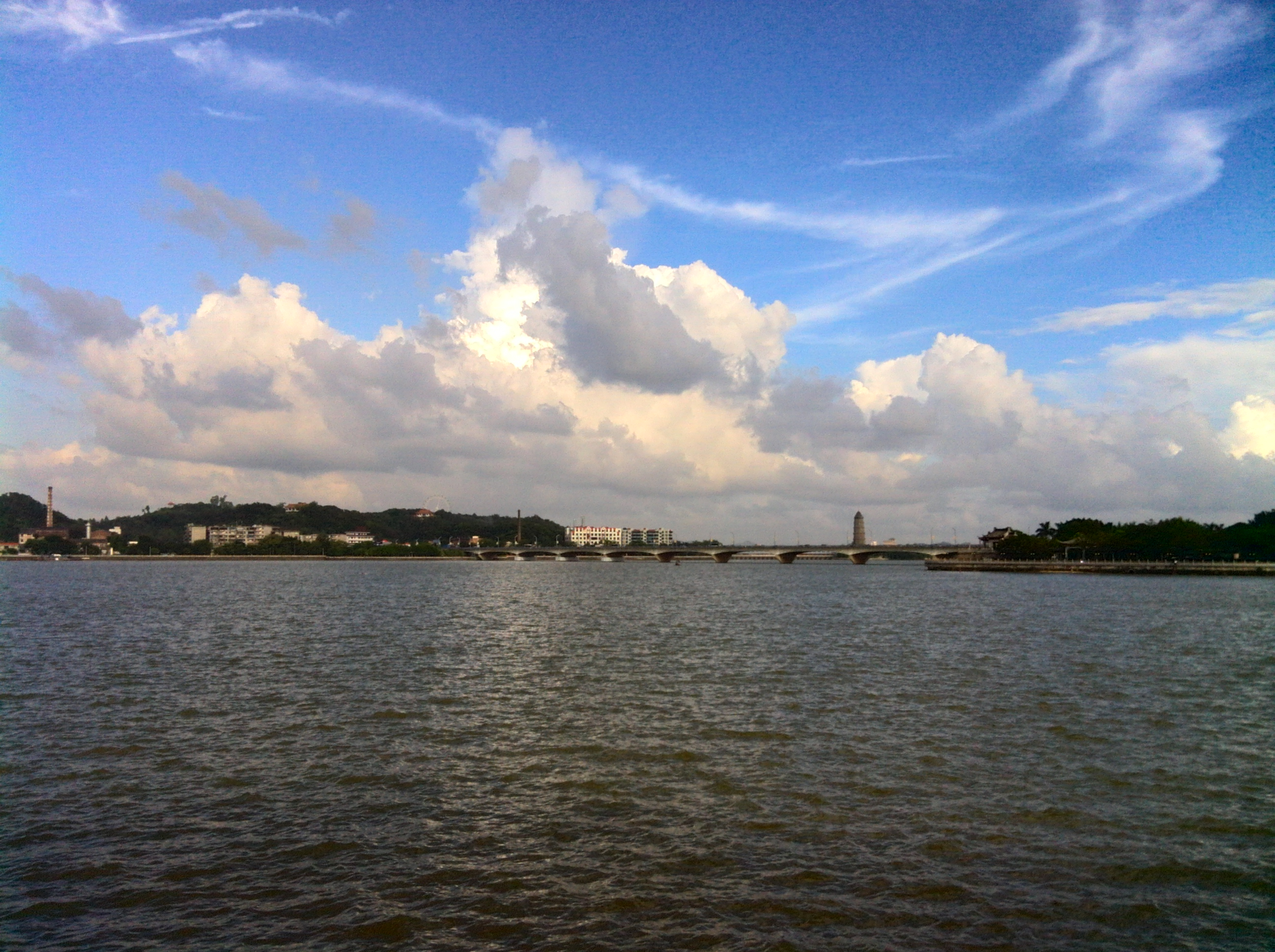
- Looking across the Han River from Chaozhou City.
- Native name: 韩江

Location
- Country: China
- Province: Guangdong, Fujian, Jiangxi
- Cities: Meizhou, Chaozhou, Shantou

Physical characteristics
- Source: Mount Qixingdong (Mei River)
  - location: Zijin County, Guangdong
- Mouth: South China Sea
  - location: Shantou, Guangdong
- Length: 410 km (250 mi)
- Basin size: 30,112 km^{2} (11,626 sq mi)
- Discharge
  - average: 870 m^{3}/s (31,000 cu ft/s)
  - minimum: 33 m^{3}/s (1,200 cu ft/s)
  - maximum: 13,300 m^{3}/s (470,000 cu ft/s)

Basin features
- Tributaries
  - left: Wuhua River, Ning River, Shiku River
  - right: Ting River, Meitan River

The Han River (simplified Chinese: 韩江; traditional Chinese: 韓江; pinyin: Hán Jiāng) is a river in southeast China. It is located mainly in eastern Guangdong and has a total length of 410 kilometres (250 mi). The river is combined with two main tributary rivers, Mei River and Ting River, at Sanheba (三河坝), Dabu County. Han River flows south through the Han River Delta entering the South China Sea at Chenghai District and Longhu District of Shantou. The Teochew people refer to the river as "the Mother River".

The river is named after Han Yu, a writer, poet and government official of the Tang dynasty, in honor of his contribution to Chaoshan. The river was full of crocodiles and always flooding. The river became calm under Han's river regulation project. To remember him, the locals rename the river to Han River after his departure.

== River regulation ==
=== The Challenges ===
About 1,300 years ago, the Han River was originally known as "evil river" (惡溪; ak4 koi1 in Teochew; E Xi in Mandarin) or "crocodile river" (鱷溪; ngag8 koi1 in Teochew). At that time, before it was ever called the Han River, the waters were infested with crocodiles, which frequently attacked and injured people.

Flooding posed an even greater challenge to the Han River than crocodiles ever did. While crocodile attacks were alarming, the river’s frequent and often destructive floods created far more serious and persistent problems for the region. Because the Han River is surrounded by mountain ranges and receives abundant rainfall, flooding has been common since ancient times. Its runoff volume is nearly half that of the Yellow River, even though its drainage basin covers only 4% of the Yellow River’s area.

According to the New Tang History, "Biography of Han Yu" (《新唐書·韓愈傳》): "When Han Yu first arrived in Chaozhou, he inquired about the people’s hardships. They all said, ‘In evil river there are crocodiles; they have devoured nearly all the people’s livestock, and the people are impoverished because of this.' (初，愈至潮，問民疾苦，皆曰：'惡溪有鱷魚，食民畜產且盡，民以是窮)".

=== Han Yu's Methods ===
Han Yu was exiled to remote Chaozhou for his "Remonstrance Against Welcoming the Buddha’s Bone" (諫迎佛骨). In governing the Han River (then called the “evil river”) and its surrounding region, he adopted a strategy that combined psychological persuasion with practical action. Although his tenure in Chaozhou was brief, the results were remarkably significant and left an influence that lasted for a millennium.

To begin with, Han Yu composed the "Proclamation to the Crocodiles" (祭鱷魚文) and conducted a ritual ceremony, using a political posture of "ritual first, force later" to assert authority — calming the people internally while "intimidating" the crocodiles externally. In reality, these rites functioned primarily as psychological reassurance for the populace.

His true achievements lay in practical governance, with environmental improvement as the central method. He mobilized the local people to clear the river channels and manage flooding, gradually transforming the once miasma-filled and dangerous "evil river" into a usable water source. He led and organized the Chaozhou residents in excavating waterways to resolve irrigation problems, encouraged diligent farming, and helped revive local agricultural production.

Although the large-scale ancient embankments that survive today were mostly reinforced by later generations, Han Yu initiated the early stages of constructing river dikes during his term, using flood control to secure agricultural stability.

=== Modern Views ===
Some scholars argue that the disappearance of crocodiles from the Han River basin was not the result of a single historical incident, but rather the cumulative impact of environmental change and expanding human activity. Research indicates that climate fluctuations, geomorphological shifts, and the intensification of land development after the Song dynasty gradually forced the crocodiles to migrate or led to their eventual extinction.

== Tourism ==
=== Guangji Bridge ===
Guangji Bridge (廣濟橋), commonly known as Xiangzi Bridge (湘子橋), spans the Han River just outside the East Gate of Xiangqiao District, Chaozhou City, Guangdong Province. It lay on an important ancient transport route linking Fujian and Guangdong. Together with Zhaozhou Bridge in Zhao County (趙縣趙州橋), Luoyang Bridge in Hui’an County (惠安縣洛陽橋), and Lugou Bridge in Beijing (北京市蘆溝橋), it is celebrated as one of "China's Four Great Ancient Bridges" (中國四大古橋). Combining the structural forms of arch bridge, beam bridge, and pontoon bridge, it is China’s first movable pontoon bridge. The renowned bridge expert Mao Yisheng praised it as one of the earliest movable bridges in the world.

Since the Qing dynasty, most travelers visiting Chaozhou naturally chose Guangji Bridge as one of their destinations, giving rise to the saying: "To come to Chaozhou without seeing the bridge is to have come in vain" (到潮不到橋，枉向潮州走一遭).

=== Phoenix in the Timely Rain ===
Phoenix in the Timely Rain (鳳凰時雨) is one of the Eight Scenic Views of Chaozhou (潮州八景). The site lies on a sandy islet beneath the Han River Bridge on the southern outskirts of the city, now known as Phoenix Islet Park (鳳凰洲公園). Blending natural beauty with historical and cultural depth, it offers an excellent vantage point for viewing Guangji Bridge and the landscapes along both banks of the Han River.

Because Phoenix Terrace stands in the middle of the river, the scene becomes especially enchanting during the rainy season: mist drifts across the water, and through the hazy drizzle the terrace appears and disappears like something from a celestial realm. Hence the name Phoenix in the Timely Rain.

The original name of Phoenix Islet was "Crow Islet" (老鴉洲). In the second year of Longqing in the Ming dynasty (1568 CE), Hou Bideng (侯必登), the prefect of Chaozhou, visited the river islet many times. Praising its serene and elegant scenery, he believed it to be a place where the legendary phoenix would perch, and certainly not a haunt for crows. He therefore changed its original name, "Crow Islet," to "Phoenix Islet," and had a stone terrace more than ten meters high constructed upon it, naming it "Phoenix Terrace."

According to local legend, the phoenixes of Phoenix Mountain, drawn to the beauty of Chaozhou Prefecture, often flew to this green oasis in the middle of the river to perch and play.

=== Han Wen Gong Temple ===
The Han Wen Gong Temple (韓文公祠), located on the western foot of Bijia Mountain (筆架山), also known as Han Mountain (韓山), on the east bank of the Han River, is the oldest and best‑preserved memorial shrine in China dedicated to the Tang‑dynasty writer Han Yu, also known as Han Wengong (韓文公) in Teochew. From the top of the complex, visitors can look out over the full panorama of the Han River and the ancient city of Chaozhou.

The temple was first built in the second year of Emperor Zhenzong’s Xianping reign of the Northern Song (999 CE). Its present layout largely dates to 1189, when it was relocated and rebuilt during the Southern Song Chunxi era (淳熙十六年), and subsequently restored in later dynasties. Most of the surviving structures reflect Ming and Qing architectural styles. Today, the site is a Major National Historical and Cultural Site and a National AAAA Tourist Attraction.

The main complex consists of two courtyards arranged front to back, simple yet elegant in design. At the center of the main hall stands a statue of Han Yu, flanked by his attendants Zhang Qian (張千) and Li Wan (李萬). Forty stone steles encircle the courtyard, recording Han Yu’s governance in Chaozhou and the poems and essays praising him through the ages. Plaques inscribed by renowned calligraphers hang from the beams.

In front of the hall grows an oak tree said to have been planted by Han Yu himself. Local lore claims that the number of blossoms it bears foretold the success of candidates in the imperial examinations. It is counted among the "Eight Scenic Views of Chaozhou."

Along the corridor of stone‑carved murals—stretching 21 meters—is depicted Su Shi’s lofty appraisal of Han Yu: "His writings revived the literary spirit that had declined for eight generations; his moral teaching saved the world from drowning" (文起八代之衰，而道濟天下之溺).

== Gallery ==
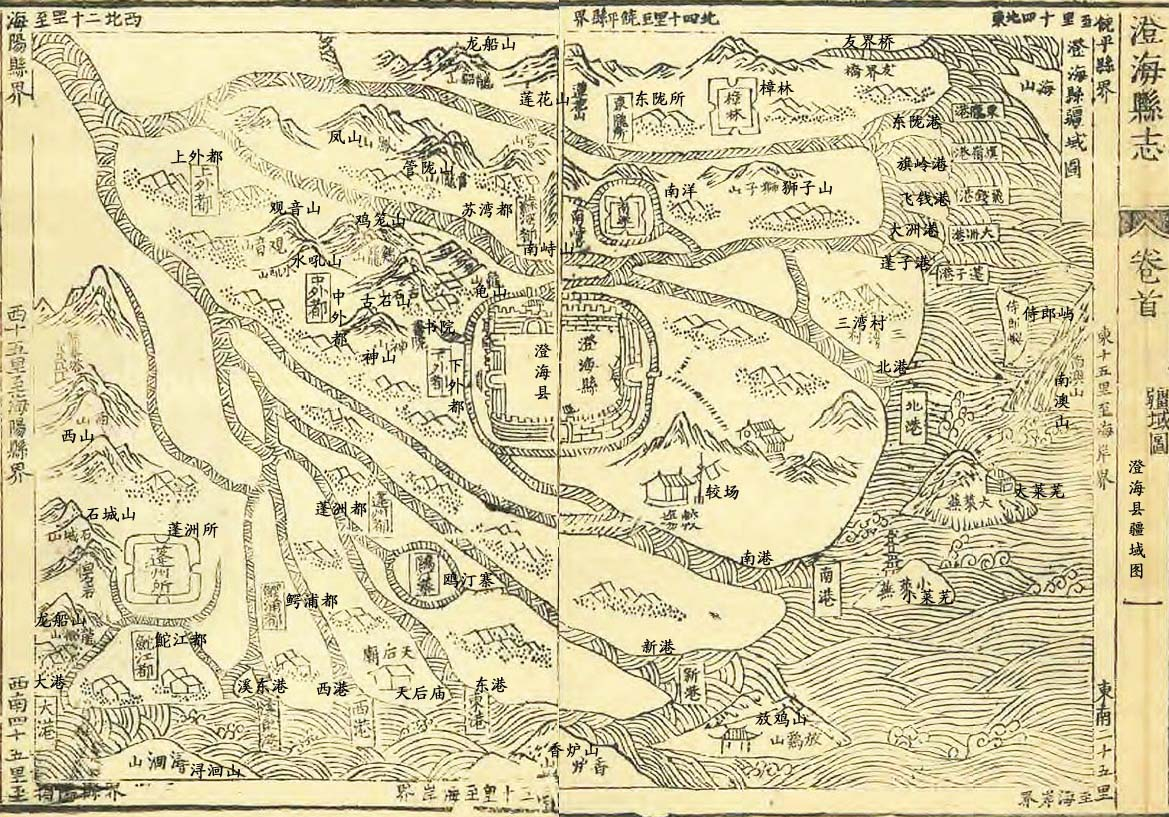
Map of Chenghai County in Ming dynasty, also indicates the delta and mouth of Han River.

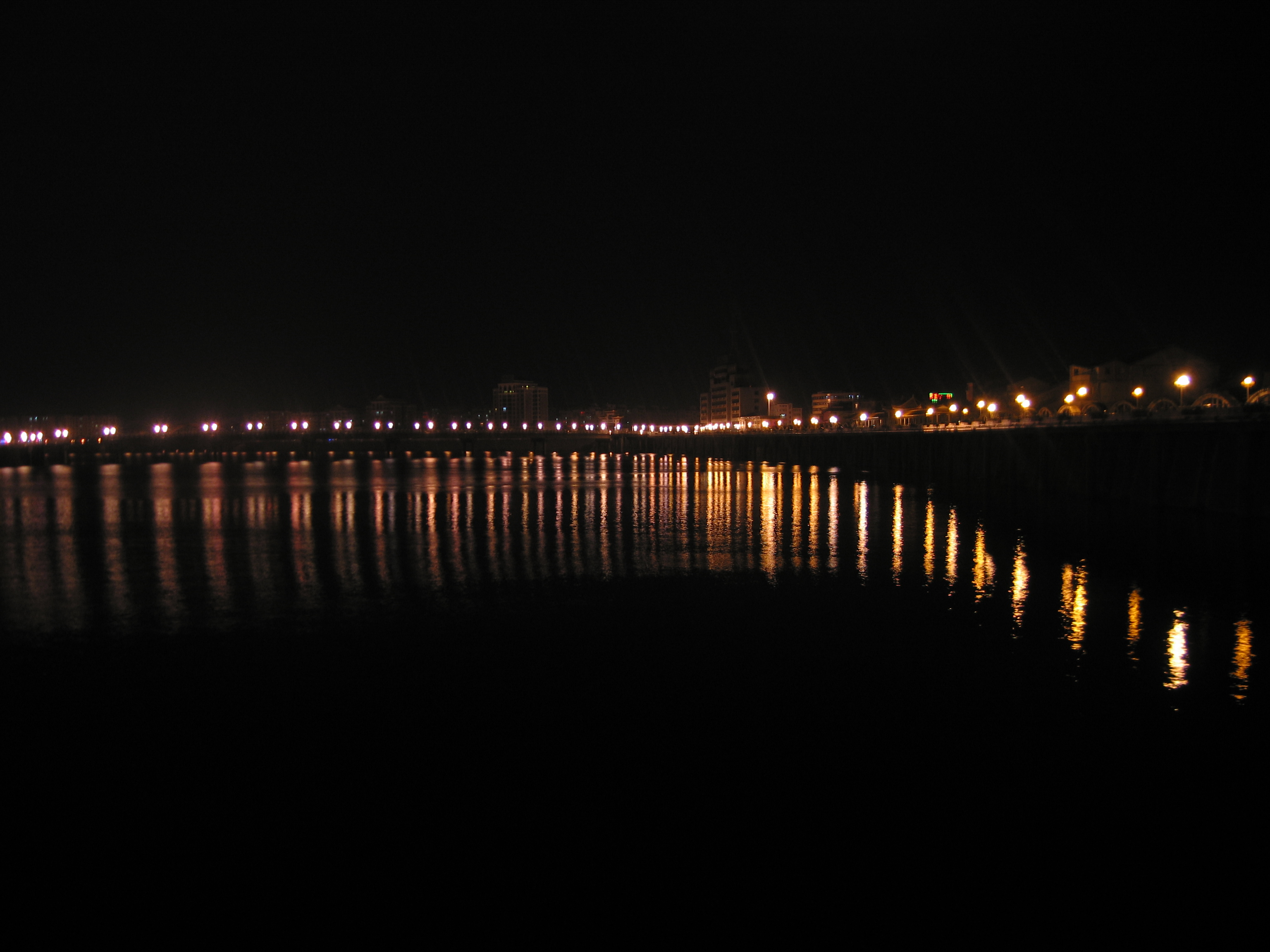
A view of the Mei River in Meizhou at night.

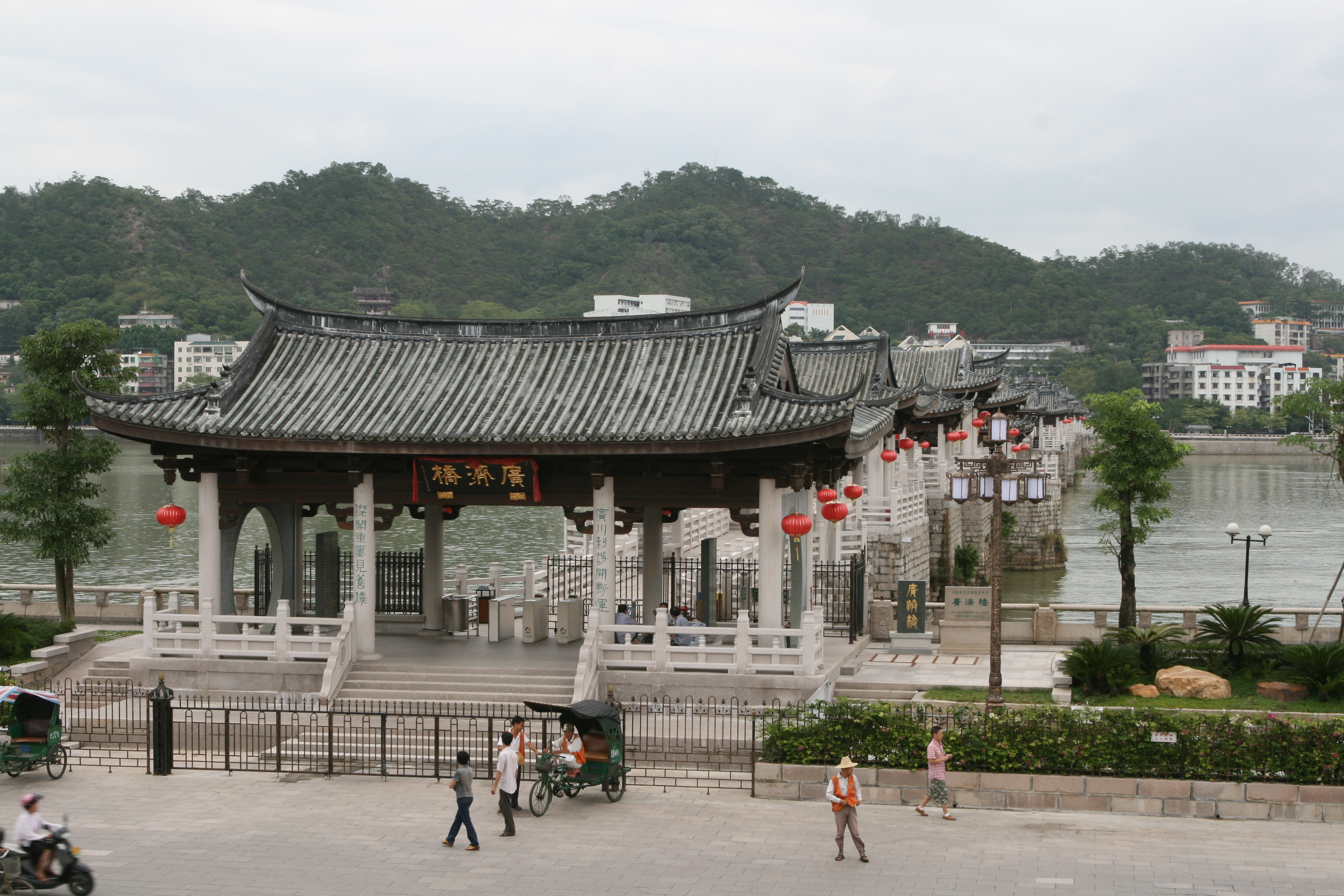
The Guangji Bridge crosses the Han River in Chaozhou.

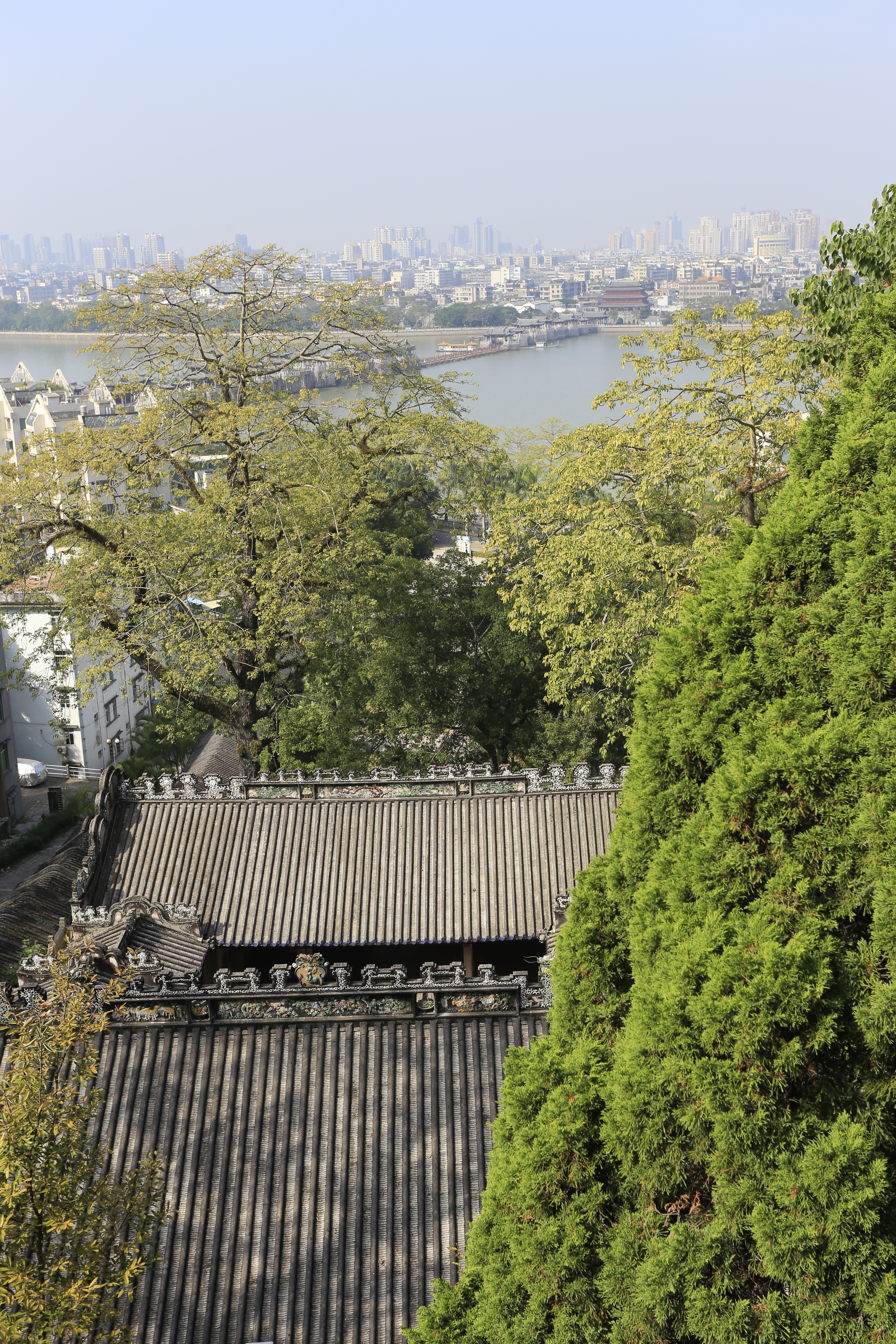
View of Han River, Guangji Bridge and Chaozhou City at Han Yu's temple.
