= Jianying Memorial Bridge =

Bridge in Meizhou, Guangdong, China

Coordinates: 24.3061°N 116.1170°E

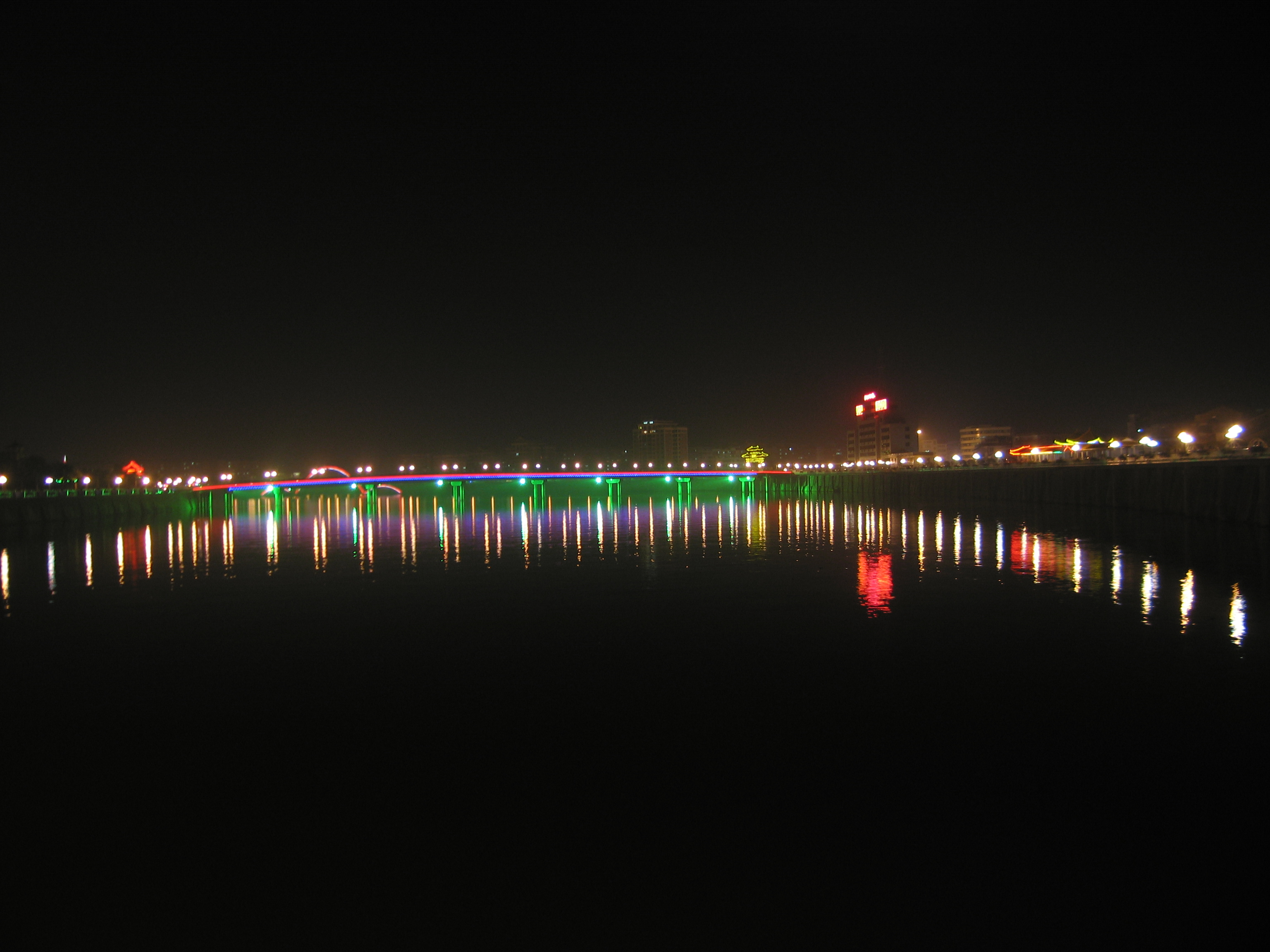
Jianying Memorial Bridge over the river at night

Jianying Memorial Bridge (simplified Chinese: 剑英纪念大桥; traditional Chinese: 劍英紀念大橋; pinyin: Jiànyīng Jìniàn Dàqiáo) is a bridge over the Meijiang River in Meizhou City, Guangdong Province, southern China.

The bridge's namesake is Ye Jianying. Using money from Overseas Chinese and the government, the bridge was constructed as a tribute to Ye's centennial birthday. It took 10 months for the Meizhou Municipal Construction Group Company (梅州市市政建设集团公司) to build the bridge, which began operating in September 1997. Construction of the bridge was entirely completed on 1 October 1998. Baihuazhou (百花洲) was largely farmland that had sparse housing in the 1990s. According to the Nanfang Daily, there has been a significant growth in pedestrian and vehicle traffic as well as the construction of tower blocks on former fields driven by the completion of the Jianying Memorial Bridge, the Delong Bridge (德龙桥), and the Nanmen Commercial Plaza (南门商业广场).

The bridge has a length of 353.8 m (1,161 ft) and a width of 15.2 m (50 ft). A 420 m (1,380 ft) road from Jiangbei leads to the bridgehead. Each side of the bridge features gardens and plazas. Under the bridge, Chinese chess players routinely meet for matches. The bridgehead features a park where residents dance and sing. A vintage-style archway sits atop the bridge, which has stone-carved railings. Stone lions occupy both sides of the archway, meant to protect people who are travelling to and from their home. Despite looking like an arch bridge, it is a beam bridge.
