= 江北区 =

江北区; 江北區, meaning "district in the north of the river", may refer to:

- Gangbuk District, Seoul, South Korea
- Jiangbei District, Chongqing, China
- Jiangbei District, Ningbo, Zhejiang, China

== See also ==
- Jiangbei (disambiguation)
- 江北 (disambiguation)
