= Jiangnan Subdistrict, Meizhou =

Coordinates: 24.2911°N 116.1300°E

Jiangnan
- Subdistrict

Chinese transcription(s)
  - Chinese: 江南
  - Pinyin: Jiāngnán
- Interactive map of Jiangnan
- Country: China
- Province: Guangdong
- Prefecture: Meizhou
- District: Meijiang
- Time zone: UTC+8 (China Standard)

Jiangnan (Chinese: 江南街道; pinyin: Jiāngnán Jīedào) is a subdistrict of the Meijiang District, Meizhou City, Guangdong, China.

The municipal government, Intermediate Court and CPC and PSB are all located in Jiangnan.

Historically, Jiangnan and its neighbour Jiangbei formed the urban core of Meixian District, from which both Jiangbei and Jiangnan were carved according to the new systems of territorial administration following the 1949 Revolution. Both names refer to the Mei River (Méi Jiāng in Pinyin), which forms a large ox-bow lake nearby. Jiangnan is on the right as one proceeds downstream, Jiangbei is on the left.

The two districts are linked by many road and foot bridges.
