= Chengbei, Meizhou =

Chengbei 城北镇
- Town
- Location in Guangdong Chengbei (China)
- Coordinates: 24°19′34″N 116°06′01″E
- Country: People's Republic of China
- Province: Guangdong
- Prefecture-level city: Meizhou
- District: Meijiang
- Village-level divisions: 5 residential communities 20 villages

Area
  - Total: 118.5 km^{2} (45.8 sq mi)
- Elevation: 91 m (299 ft)

Population
  - Total: 55,000
  - Density: 460/km^{2} (1,200/sq mi)
- Time zone: UTC+8 (China Standard)
- Area code: 0753

Chengbei (Chinese: 城北镇; pinyin: Chéngběi Zhèn; lit. 'city north town') is a town in the Meijiang District, Meizhou, Guangdong, People's Republic of China. As of 2011, it has administrative responsibility for five residential communities and 20 villages. The town has a total population of 55,000 residing in an area of 118.5 square kilometres (45.8 sq mi).

== See also ==
- List of township-level divisions of Guangdong
