= Sanjiao =

Sanjiao may refer to:

- San Jiao, term in traditional Chinese medicine
- Sanjiao, Meizhou, town Meizhou, Guangdong, China
- Sanjiao, Zhongshan, town in Zhongshan, Guangdong, China
- Three teachings, or sanjiao in pinyin, Confucianism, Taoism, and Buddhism when considered as a harmonious aggregate
