= Ningjiang =

Ningjiang may refer to:

- Ningjiang District, in Songyuan, Jilin, China
- Ning River, in Guangdong, China
