= Jiaoling County =

Jiaoling 蕉岭县 Chiuling; Chiaoling
- County
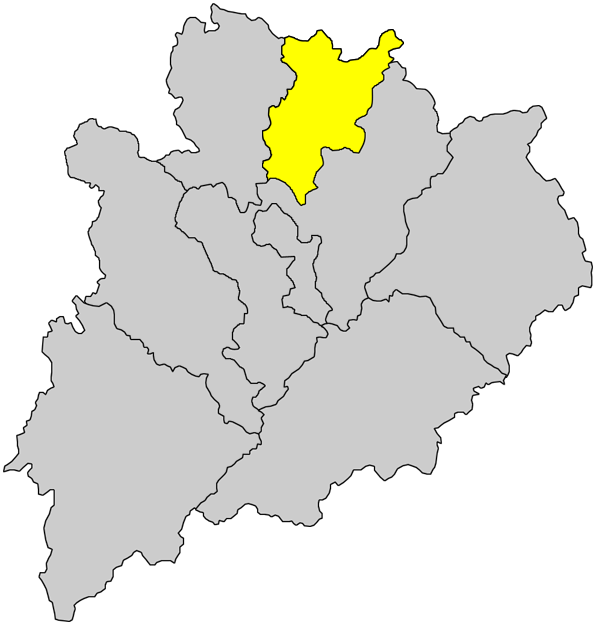
- Location in Meizhou

- Location of the seat in Guangdong
- Coordinates: 24°40′N 116°10′E
- Country: People's Republic of China
- Province: Guangdong
- Prefecture-level city: Meizhou

Area
  - Total: 957 km^{2} (369 sq mi)

Population (2020 census)
  - Total: 184,355
  - Density: 193/km^{2} (499/sq mi)
- Time zone: UTC+8 (China Standard)
- Website: www.jiaoling.gov.cn

Jiaoling County (postal: Chiuling; simplified Chinese: 蕉岭; traditional Chinese: 蕉嶺) is a county in the northeast of Guangdong Province, China, bordering Fujian province to the north. Under the jurisdiction of Meizhou City, it was previously known as the Zhenping County (postal: Chenping).

== Ethno-linguistic make-up ==
Jiaoling is noted for its large Hakka population.

== Notable people ==
- Qiu Fengjia or Chiu Feng-Chia (丘逢甲) was a Taiwanese Hakka−Chinese patriot, educator, and poet. He fought to defend Taiwan following the Qing dynasty's cession of Formosa (Taiwan) and the Pescadores to Japan in April 1895 at the end of the First Sino-Japanese War. This led to the formation of the Republic of Formosa. Feng Chia University in Taichung, Taiwan is named in honor of him.
- Qiu Nian-Tai or Chiu Nian-Tai (丘念台) was a Taiwanese Hakka-Chinese Control Yuan member in the Kuomintang-led Taiwanese government. He is the son of Chiu Feng-Chia.
- Xie Jinyuan (謝晉元) was a Chinese nationalist military officer during second Sino-Japanese war.
- Shing-Tung Yau (丘成桐), a Chinese American mathematician and the William Caspar Graustein professor of mathematics at Harvard University.

== Climate ==
Climate data for Jiaoling, elevation 136 m (446 ft), (1991–2020 normals, extremes 1981–2010)
| Month | Jan | Feb | Mar | Apr | May | Jun | Jul | Aug | Sep | Oct | Nov | Dec | Year |
|---|---|---|---|---|---|---|---|---|---|---|---|---|---|
| Record high °C (°F) | 28.2 (82.8) | 30.2 (86.4) | 32.3 (90.1) | 34.8 (94.6) | 36.5 (97.7) | 38.2 (100.8) | 39.2 (102.6) | 38.5 (101.3) | 37.7 (99.9) | 35.6 (96.1) | 34.5 (94.1) | 29.0 (84.2) | 39.2 (102.6) |
| Mean daily maximum °C (°F) | 17.9 (64.2) | 20.2 (68.4) | 22.4 (72.3) | 26.2 (79.2) | 29.7 (85.5) | 32.0 (89.6) | 34.3 (93.7) | 34.0 (93.2) | 32.5 (90.5) | 29.2 (84.6) | 24.7 (76.5) | 19.6 (67.3) | 26.9 (80.4) |
| Daily mean °C (°F) | 12.2 (54.0) | 14.6 (58.3) | 17.3 (63.1) | 21.2 (70.2) | 24.8 (76.6) | 27.0 (80.6) | 28.5 (83.3) | 28.1 (82.6) | 26.9 (80.4) | 23.3 (73.9) | 18.9 (66.0) | 13.6 (56.5) | 21.4 (70.5) |
| Mean daily minimum °C (°F) | 8.6 (47.5) | 11.1 (52.0) | 13.9 (57.0) | 17.6 (63.7) | 21.5 (70.7) | 24.0 (75.2) | 24.8 (76.6) | 24.5 (76.1) | 23.3 (73.9) | 19.2 (66.6) | 15.0 (59.0) | 9.8 (49.6) | 17.8 (64.0) |
| Record low °C (°F) | −0.4 (31.3) | 0.1 (32.2) | 0.5 (32.9) | 8.2 (46.8) | 13.0 (55.4) | 16.6 (61.9) | 20.1 (68.2) | 21.0 (69.8) | 15.5 (59.9) | 7.4 (45.3) | 2.9 (37.2) | −2.9 (26.8) | −2.9 (26.8) |
| Average precipitation mm (inches) | 58.7 (2.31) | 86.2 (3.39) | 156.5 (6.16) | 192.2 (7.57) | 259.9 (10.23) | 301.1 (11.85) | 161.0 (6.34) | 220.7 (8.69) | 116.7 (4.59) | 37.7 (1.48) | 38.9 (1.53) | 43.5 (1.71) | 1,673.1 (65.85) |
| Average precipitation days (≥ 0.1 mm) | 8.1 | 10.9 | 16.1 | 16.3 | 17.5 | 19.1 | 14.3 | 17.3 | 11.0 | 5.1 | 5.7 | 6.2 | 147.6 |
| Average snowy days | 0.1 | 0 | 0 | 0 | 0 | 0 | 0 | 0 | 0 | 0 | 0 | 0 | 0.1 |
| Average relative humidity (%) | 72 | 75 | 78 | 79 | 80 | 82 | 76 | 78 | 75 | 70 | 70 | 68 | 75 |
| Mean monthly sunshine hours | 122.7 | 94.3 | 88.8 | 100.2 | 118.4 | 131.8 | 203.2 | 190.2 | 183.3 | 183.3 | 158.8 | 142.1 | 1,717.1 |
| Percentage possible sunshine | 37 | 29 | 24 | 26 | 29 | 32 | 49 | 48 | 50 | 52 | 49 | 43 | 39 |
Source: China Meteorological Administration
