= Meijiang, Meizhou =

Meijiang 梅江区
- District
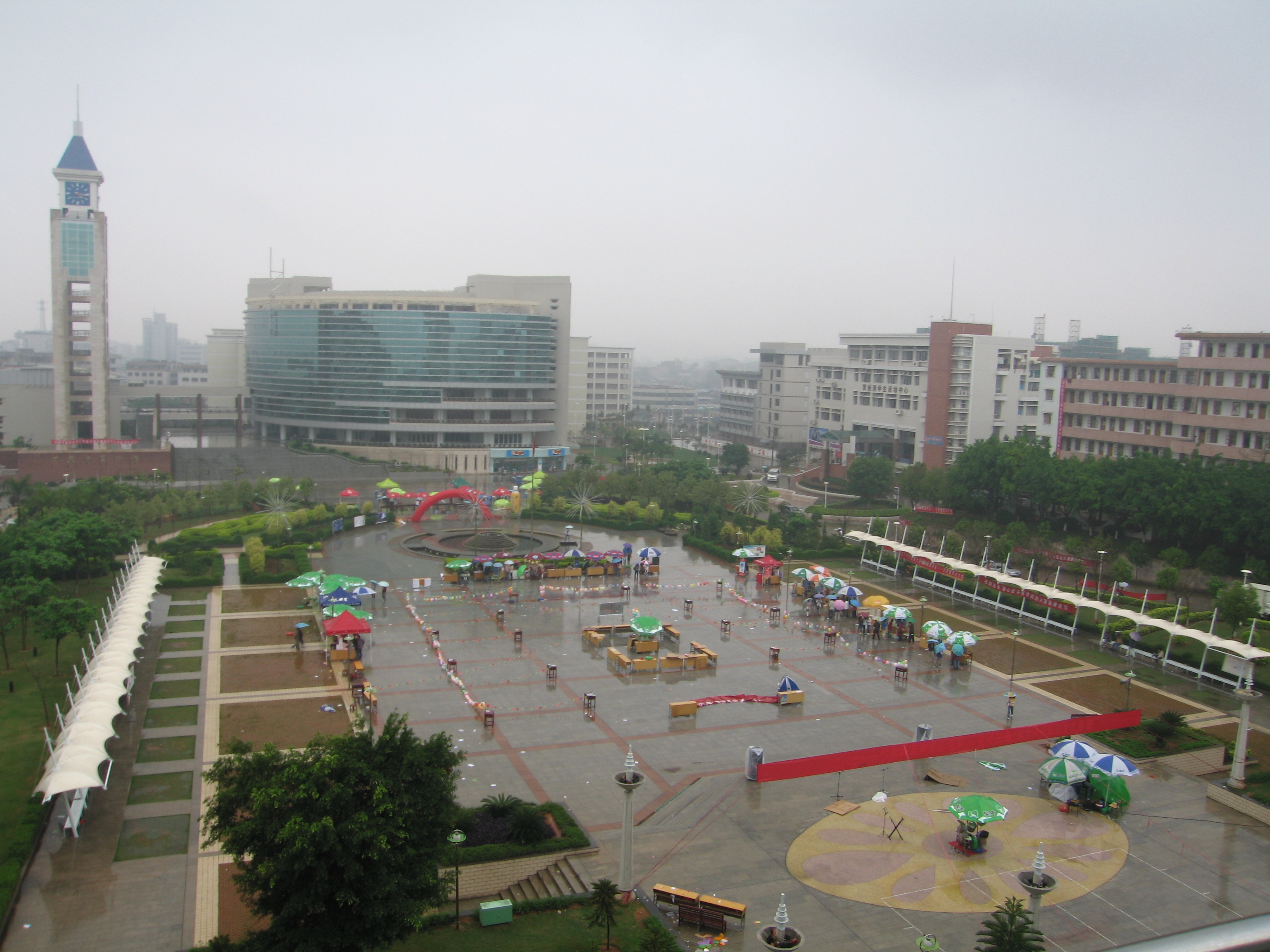

- Location in Guangdong
- Coordinates: 24°18′37″N 116°06′00″E
- Country: People's Republic of China
- Province: Guangdong
- Prefecture-level city: Meizhou

Area
  - Total: 323 km^{2} (125 sq mi)

Population (2020 census)
  - Total: 435,616
  - Density: 1,350/km^{2} (3,490/sq mi)
- Time zone: UTC+8 (China Standard)
- Postal code: 514000
- Area code: 0753
- Website: http://www.meijiang.gov.cn/

Meijiang (simplified Chinese: 梅江区; traditional Chinese: 梅江區; pinyin: Méijiāng Qū) is a district of Meizhou City, Guangdong Province, China.

== Administrative divisions ==
- Subdistricts (街道):
  - Jinshan (金山街道)
  - Jiangnan (江南街道)
  - Xijiao (西郊街道)
- Towns:
  - Changsha (长沙镇)
  - Sanjiao (三角镇)
  - Chengbei (城北镇)

== Ethno-linguistic make-up ==
Meijiang is noted for its large Hakka population.
