= Changsha, Meizhou =

Town in Meizhou, Guangdong, China

Coordinates: 24.2225°N 116.1250°E

- Simplified Chinese: 长沙镇
Transcriptions
Standard Mandarin
- Hanyu Pinyin: Chángshā Zhèn

Changsha is a town in the Meijiang District of Meizhou City, Guangdong Province in southern China.
