= Xijiao Subdistrict, Meizhou =

Subdistrict of Guangdong Province, China

Coordinates: 24.3121°N 116.1080°E

- Simplified Chinese: 西郊街道
Transcriptions
Standard Mandarin
- Hanyu Pinyin: Xijiāo jiēdào

Xijiao is a subdistrict in the Meijiang District of Meizhou City, Guangdong Province, southern China.
