= Horn House =

Horn house
- 牛角屋
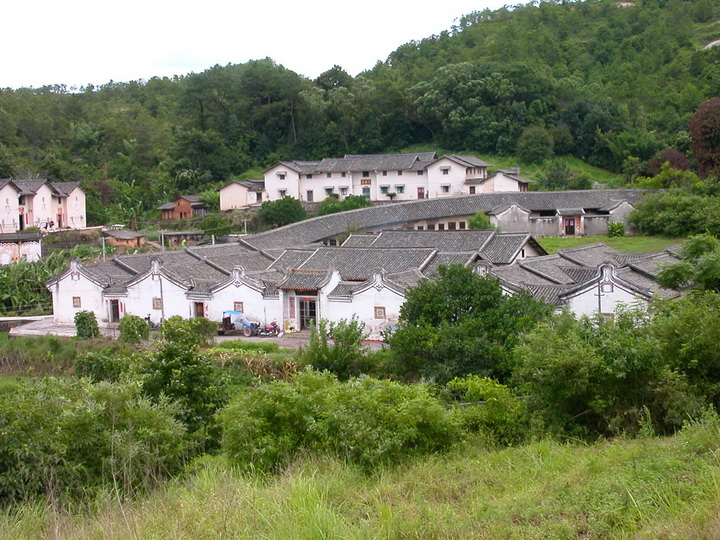
- Horn house from the front
- Interactive map of the Horn house area

General information
- Type: House
- Location: Mei County, Guangdong, China
- Coordinates: 24.3091167°N 116.2309139°E
- Completed: 1884

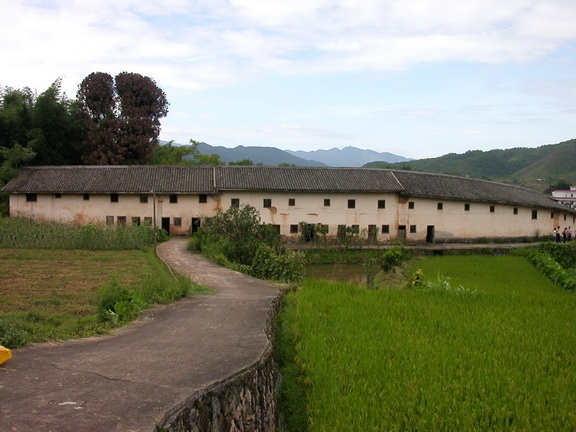
Horn house from the back

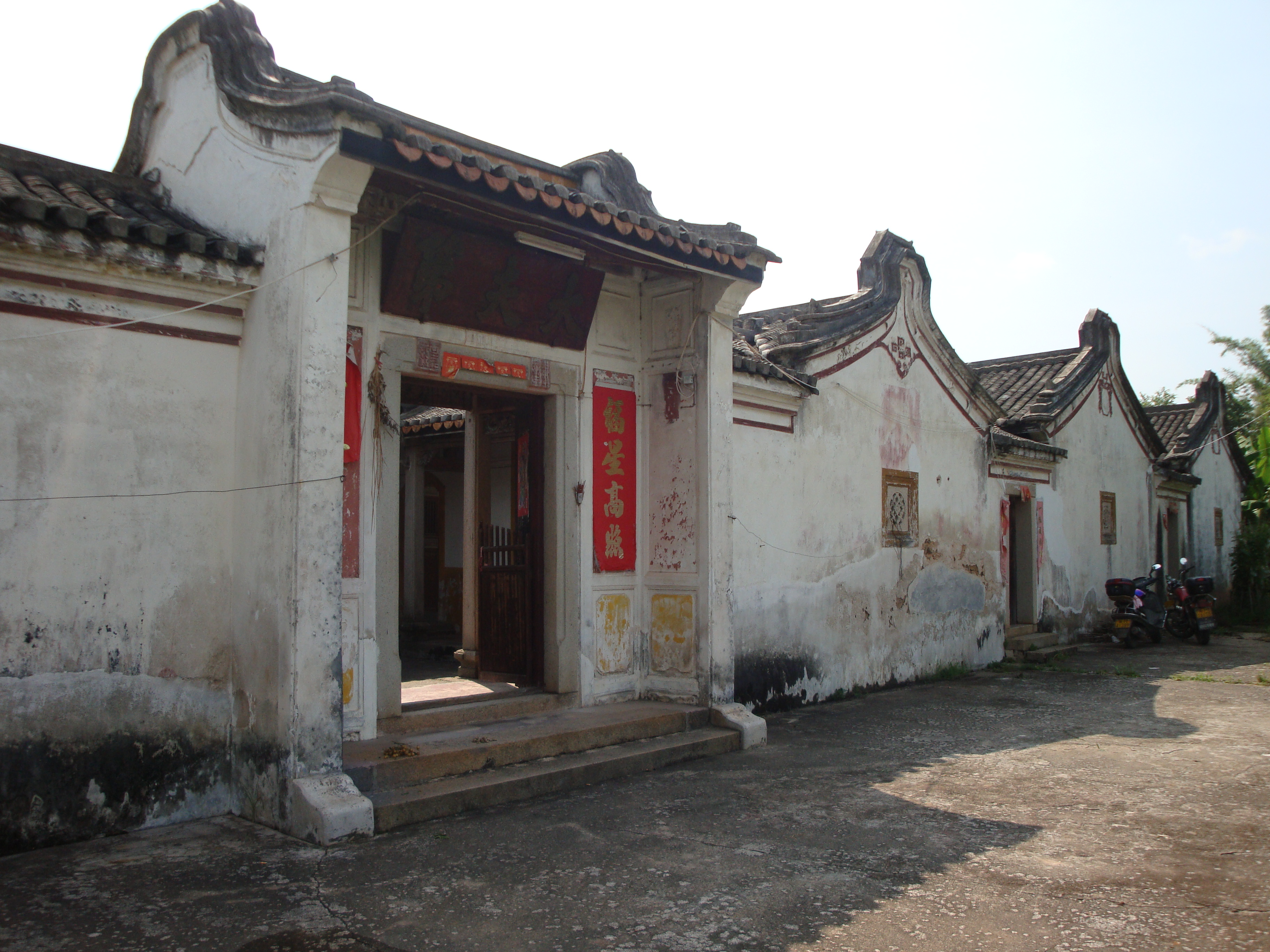
Main Gate

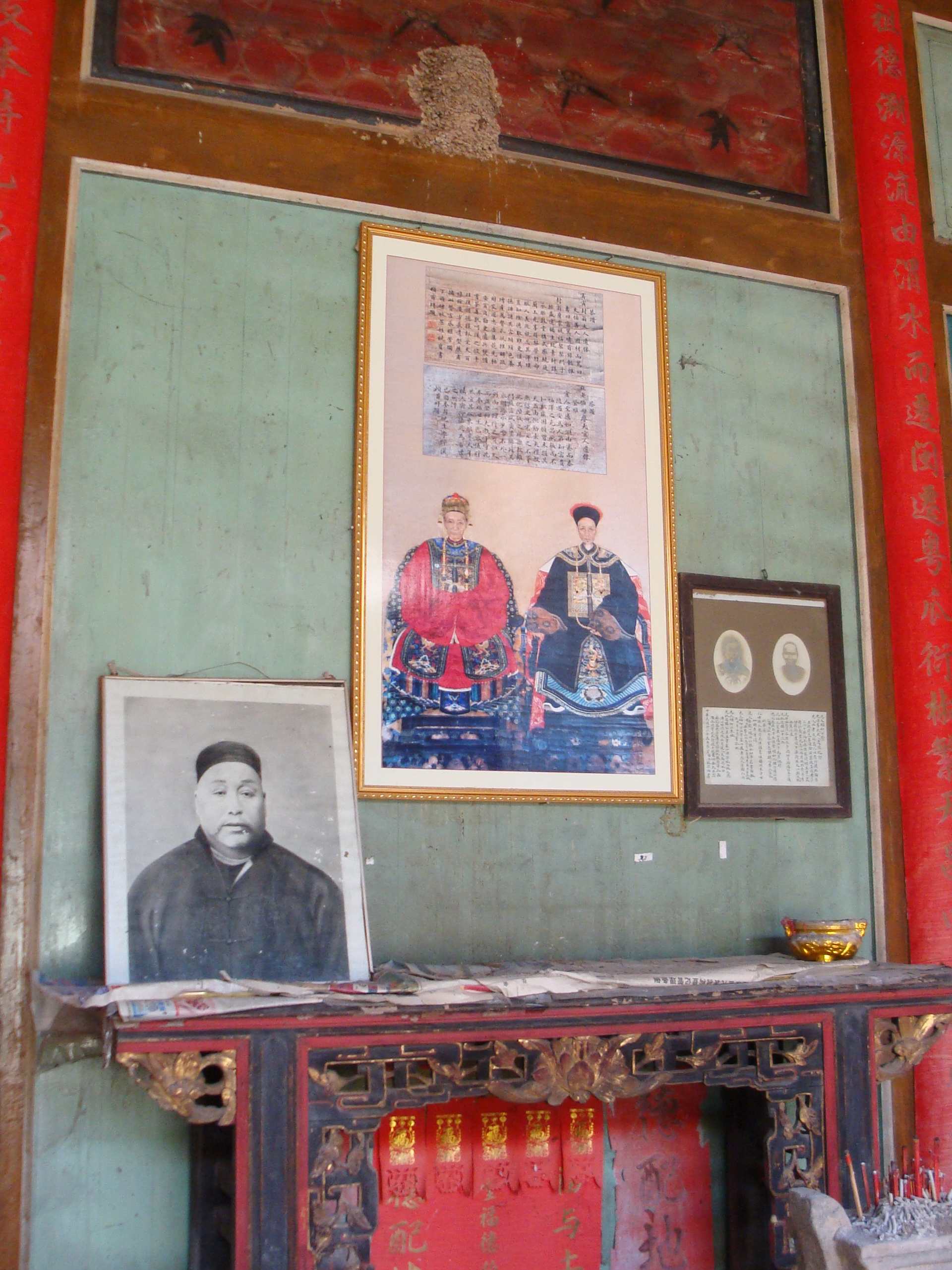
Qiu Kailin (left); Qiu Changsheng and madam (center)

Horn House (Chinese: 牛角屋; pinyin: Niújiǎo wū) is a Hakka bar-style house located at Mei County, Xiyang, Fuliang village. It is about 16 kilometers east of Meizhou, Guangdong, China.

This house is also called "Da Fu Di" (Chinese: 大夫弟; pinyin: Dàfūdì), which belongs to one of the members of the Qiu family (丘).

This house was built by Qiu Kailin (丘开麟) and his brother Qiu Xianglin (丘湘麟), sons of Qiu Changsheng (丘昌盛). In their early years, they traveled to Indonesia for business. Qiu Kailin founded the Kwong Long Company (广隆公司) in Jakarta. After they garnered enough money, they went back to their hometown and built the house. The house was completed in 1884, after 10 years of construction. The whole house has 89 rooms.
