= Guangji Bridge (Chaozhou) =

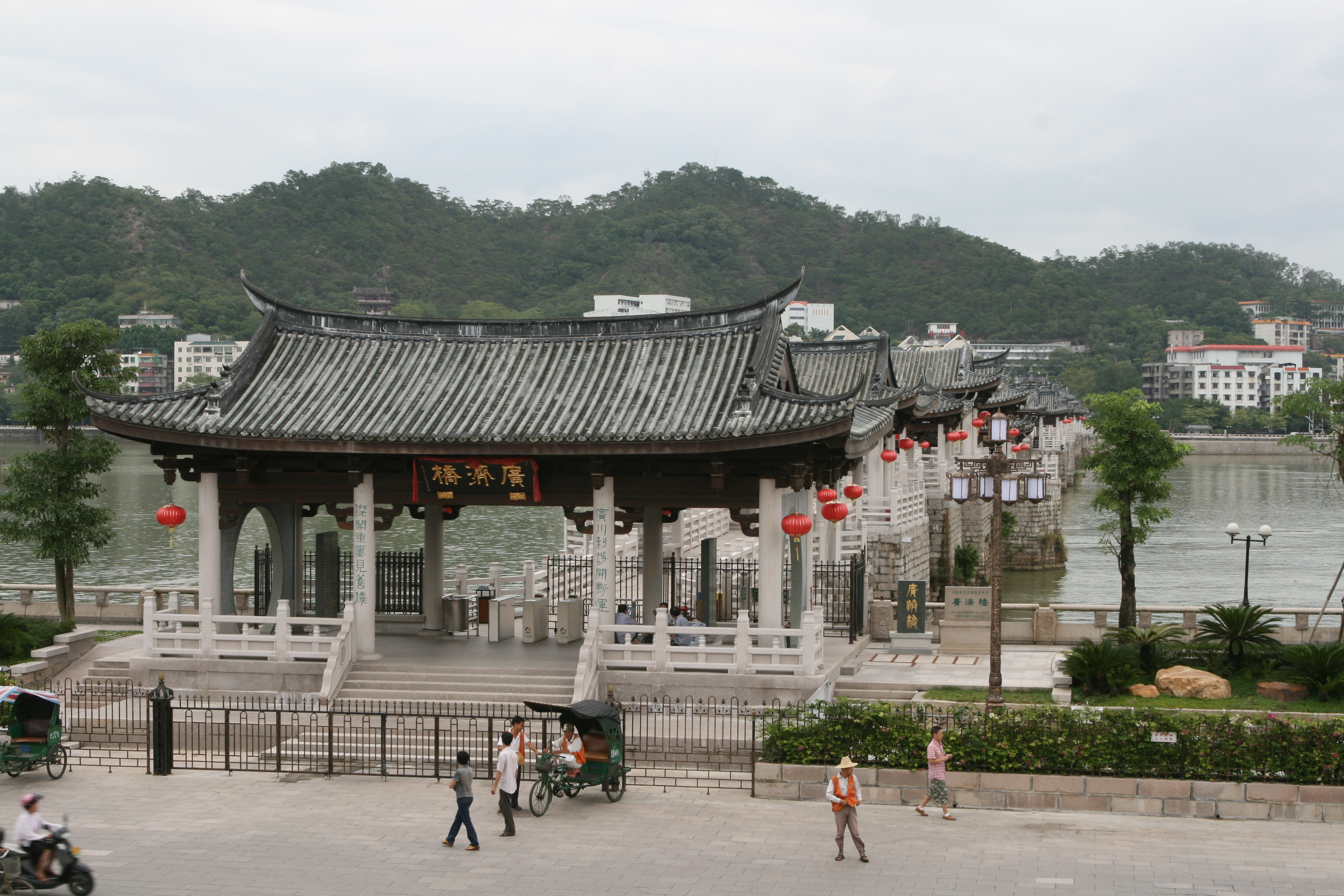
- a view of Guangji Bridge from the ancient city wall on the west bank
- Coordinates: 23.6632°N 116.6505°E
- Crosses: Han River
- Locale: Chaozhou, Guangdong

Characteristics
- Design: beam bridge, bateau bridge, pontoon bridge, open-close bridge
- Total length: 517.95 metres (1,699 ft)
- No. of spans: 18
- Piers in water: 24

History
- Construction start: 1170 (Year 7 of the Qiandao era, Southern Song)

Location
- Interactive map of Guangji Bridge

Guangji Bridge
- Traditional Chinese: 廣濟橋
- Simplified Chinese: 广济桥
- Literal meaning: "Broad River Crossing Bridge"
Transcriptions
Standard Mandarin
- Hanyu Pinyin: Guǎngjì Qiáo
- Bopomofo: ㄍㄨㄤˇㄐㄧˋㄑㄧㄠˊ
- Wade–Giles: Kwang^{3}-chi^{4} Chiao^{2}
- IPA: /kɯŋ⁵².t͡si²¹³.kio⁵⁵/
Yue: Cantonese
- Yale Romanization: Gwóngjaikìuh
- Jyutping: Gwong2zai3kiu4
Southern Min
- Hokkien POJ: Kńg-chè-kiô
- Tâi-lô: Kńg-tsè-kiô
- Teochew Peng'im: Geng^{2}zi^{3}gio^{5}

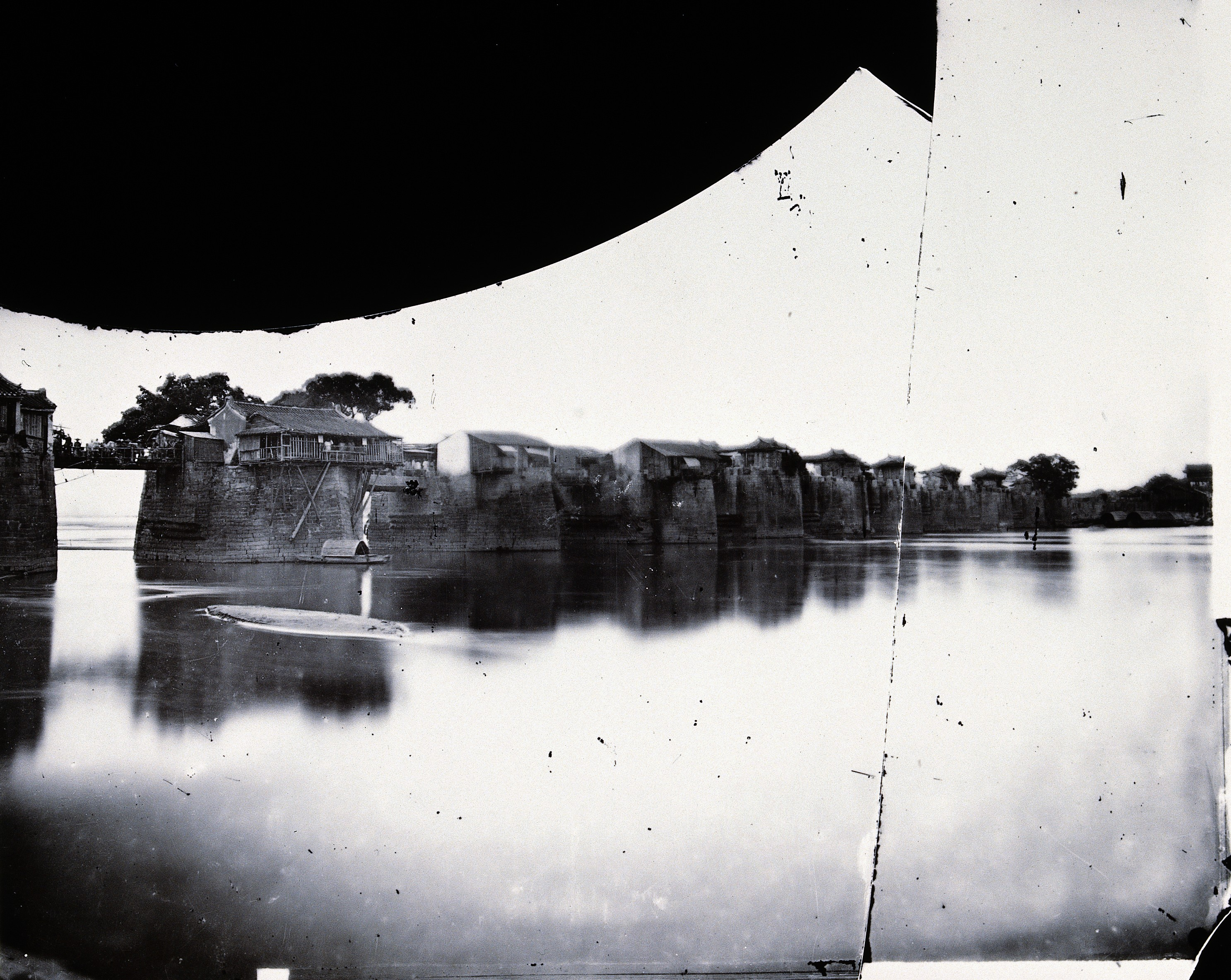
The bridge photographed in 1869 by John Thomson

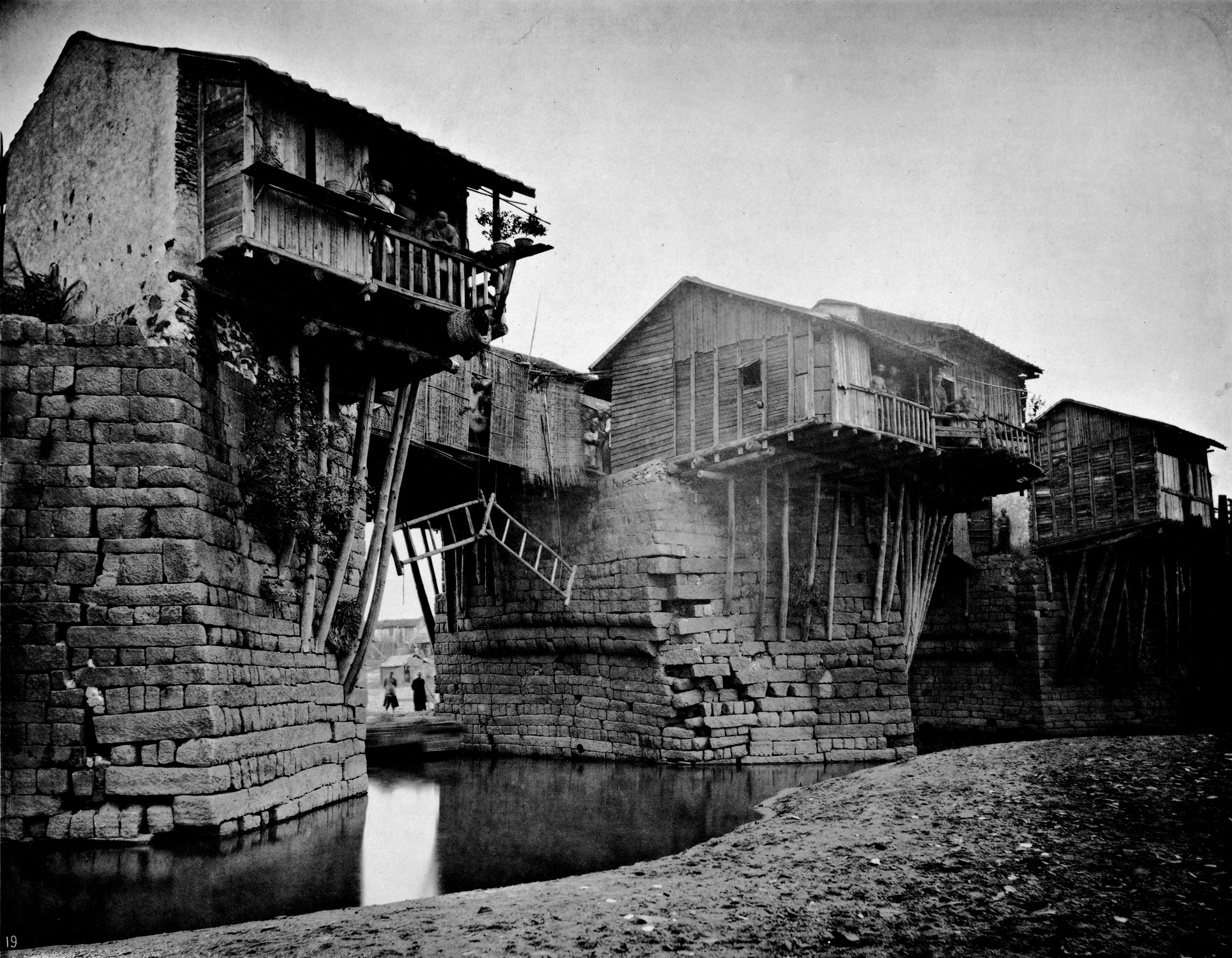
The bridge photographed in 1869 by John Thomson

Guangji Bridge (simplified Chinese: 广济桥; traditional Chinese: 廣濟橋; pinyin: Guǎngjì Qiáo; lit. 'Great Charity Bridge'), also known as Xiangzi Bridge (simplified Chinese: 湘子桥; traditional Chinese: 湘子橋; pinyin: Xiāngzǐ Qiáo), is an ancient bridge that crosses the Han River east of Chaozhou, Guangdong province, China. A key cultural relic under national protection, the bridge is renowned as one of China's four famous ancient bridges, the other three being Zhaozhou Bridge, Lugou Bridge, and Luoyang Bridge.

There is an old saying, "到潮不到桥，枉向潮州走一遭", that means if you go to Chaozhou without visiting the bridge, you cannot say that you have been to Chaozhou. Mao Yisheng, a famous expert on the bridge, said, "A part of Guangji Bridge is connected by boats as a pontoon bridge. When it is open, there is a channel for ships and boats to get across. It can also be closed. Since it can be open or closed, it is a special case in the history of bridges in China." There are various pavilions on the bridge, so there is a popular saying, "twenty-four pavilions have twenty-four styles". The pavilions housed businesses. It was a prosperous time, so people said, "In one Li one the bridge, there is one Li of business market."

== History ==
Guangji Bridge was built by Zeng Wang, a magistrate under the Song dynasty (1170). At that time, it was a floating bridge consisting of 86 large boats connected to one another. Its original name was Kangji Bridge.

In the year 1174 (Chunxi Year 淳熙元年间), it was broken up by flooding, so another magistrate, of Chang Wei prefecture, had workers start to reconstruct it, beginning with bridge piers on the west bank. By 1194, several magistrates of the prefecture—including Zhu Jiang, Wang Zhenggong, Ding Yinyuan, and Wang Shujin—had been involved in the construction of 10 bridge piers. Ding Yunyuan built the most piers; and for his outstanding achievements, the bridge was called Ding Gong Bridge (丁公橋). In 1194 (the 5th year of Zhaoxi, 绍熙五年), a magistrate (太守) of Shen Zongyu prefecture built a pavilion on the east bank and named the bridge Jichuan Bridge. Later, more magistrates became involved in its construction. By 1206 (the second year of Kaixi 开禧二年), 13 piers had been built.

After the construction of the east and west bridgeheads was completed, they were connected by some boats, which formed a bridge with the features of both a beam bridge and a pontoon bridge.

In the years between the late Song dynasty and Yuan dynasty, the surrounding area of the bridge was sometimes prosperous and sometimes poor. In 1435 (Ming dynasty), a magistrate of a prefecture (知府) named Wang Yuan had it reconstructed. When it was finished, the west bridge had 10 piers supporting 9 spans and the east bridge had 13 piers supporting 12 spans, with 24 boats in between. There were 126 rooms in the pavilions on the bridge. The bridge was named Guangji Bridge.

In 1513 (the eighth year of Zhengde), another magistrate of a prefecture, Tan Lun, added a pier and removed six boats; and the Guangji Bridge then consisted of 18 boats and 24 piers. People described it as, "eighteen pontoon boats and twenty‑four piers" (十八梭船二十四洲, lit. eighteen shuttle boats [and] twenty-four continents).

In 1724 (the second year of Yongzheng (雍正二年), Zhang Ziqian, magistrate of a prefecture, repaired the bridge and had two statues of oxen cast, one for the west bridge and the one for the east, which were meant to protect the bridge. In 1842, the eastern ox statue was lost to a flood. There is a folksong about it, which praises the beautiful scene of Guangji Bridge, describing 18 boats, 24 piers, 24 pavilions, and the 2 statues of oxen made of cast iron (潮州湘桥好风流，十八梭船，二十四洲，二十四楼台，二十四样，二只鉎牛一只溜).

After over 400 years, the pavilions are gone, and the ox statue on the east pier washed away by floods. In 1958, a beam bridge supplanted the pontoon bridge. In 1989, the Chaozhou municipal government completed the construction of the modern Hanjiang Bridge (韓江大橋) one kilometer downstream from Guangji Bridge, thereby bringing Guangji Bridge's historical role as a transportation link to an end. After Guangji Bridge ceased to serve any transportation function in 1989, it was not until 2003 that large‑scale restoration work officially began. The project restored its pavilions and towers in the original Ming‑dynasty style and rebuilt the floating bridge section. Since then, Guangji Bridge has served solely as a tourist attraction.

In Chaozhou, there is a street called Paifang Street. Beside this street, there are the many archways of the bridge. One of the Chaozhou Eight Famous Scenes is of the rising river of Han River (湘桥春涨). Every year, the bridge attracts a large number of visitors. The construction of the Xiamen-Shenzhen Railway enabled a greater number of people to visit the bridge and learn the culture of Chaozhou.

== Features ==
This bridge has the features of a beam bridge, arch bridge, and pontoon bridge, which makes it unique in China. On the bridge, there were various rooms and pavilions, with ox statues on the west and east bridge. People did business on it, so it was also known as "In one Li one the bridge, there is one Li of business market".

== Legends ==
Each pier of Guangji Bridge has a history of several hundred years. From the Song dynasty when the first one was built to the year when there were 24, it lasted over 300 years. In ancient times, with their backwardness, it was unimaginable that people could build such a long bridge. Therefore, there is a legend that it was fairies who constructed the bridge.

When Han Yu, a famous poet in the history of China, came to Chaozhou, he always climbed the Bijia mountain (now called Han Mountain). From the top of the mountain, he saw the river and the difficulty of crossing it, so he asked his nephew Han Xiangzi and a monk Guangji to build a bridge. Han Xiangzi built the east bridge. He invited eight fairies (八仙) to help him. Han Xiangzi himself climbed Fenghuang Mountain, in Chaozhou, for stones. He changed the stones into black pigs and chased them to the bridge. On the way, a woman cast a spell so the pigs changed back into the stones, which could not move. Consequently, several piers in the east were not built. In order to commemorate this, people named it Xiangzi Bridge.

Guangji the monk invited eighteen arhats to help him build the bridge in the west. He went on Sanpu Mountain to get stones. He changed the stones into cattle and sheep and chased them back. On the way, he met an evil landlord who tried to stop him and get his cattle and sheep. Guangji lost some cattle, so part of the bridge was not built. He Xiangu, a female fairy, dropped a lotus petal onto the river and changed it into 18 boats connecting the bridge. Guangji raised his cane and created chains to connect the boats together.

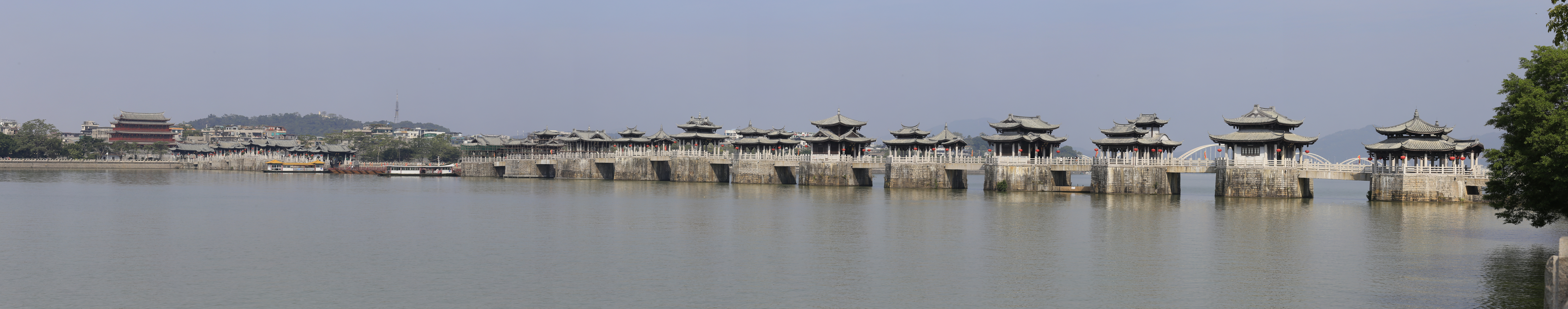

== See also ==
- List of bridges in China
