= Jiangbei =

Jiangbei (Chinese: 江北) may refer to:

- Henan Jiangbei Province, during the Yuan dynasty
- Jiangbei District, Chongqing, China
- Jiangbei District, Ningbo, Zhejiang, China
- Jiangbei, Meizhou, Guangdong, China
- Jiangbei region, north of Yangtze River
  - Jiangbei people
