= 江北 =

江北, meaning "north of the river", may refer to:

In the Mandarin Chinese reading Jiāngběi

- All areas of China north of the Yangtze River
- Jiangbei District, Chongqing, People's Republic of China (north of the Jialing and Yangtze Rivers)
- Jiangbei District, Ningbo, Zhejiang, People's Republic of China (north of the Yong River)
- Jiangbei, Meizhou, Guangdong, People's Republic of China (north of the Mei River)

In the Korean reading Gangbuk, also spelled Kangbuk:

- Gangbuk-gu, Seoul, South Korea (north of the Han River)

In the Japanese on-yomi Kōhoku

- Kōhoku, Saga, Japan (north of the Rokkaku River)
- Kōhoku, Adachi, Tokyo, Japan (north of the Arakawa River)

== See also ==
- Northern and southern China
