= Jinshan Subdistrict, Meizhou =

Subdistrict of Guangdong Province, China

Coordinates: 21.8169°N 110.8671°E

- Simplified Chinese: 金山街道
Transcriptions
Standard Mandarin
- Hanyu Pinyin: Jīnshān Jiēdào

Jinshan is a subdistrict in the Meijiang District of Meizhou City, Guangdong Province, southern China.
