= Jana Chen =

Chinese singer (born 1989)

- Born: Chen Juan'er; January 27, 1989 (age 37); Meizhou, Guangdong, China
- Occupation: Singer
- Years active: 2004–present

Chinese name
- Traditional Chinese: 陳娟兒
Transcriptions
Standard Mandarin
- Hanyu Pinyin: Chen Juan Er
Yue: Cantonese
- Jyutping: Can4 Gyun1 Ji4
- Musical career
- Also known as: Jana Chen
- Origin: China
- Genres: Mandopop
- Instrument: Voice
- Label: Dongjia Entertainment 2010–2016. Shizhong Entertainment 2016–present

Chen Juan'er (Chinese: 陈娟儿; pinyin: Chén juān er, born January 27, 1989), known professionally as Jana Chen, is a Chinese C-pop (Mandopop) singer who started her career in 2010.

== Biography ==
=== Personal life ===
Chen Juan'er was born in Meizhou, Guangdong, in a middle-class family. She started showing interest in music when she was a child. Following her artistic interest some years later, she emigrated to Guangzhou and entered the Xinghai Conservatory of Music, where she started developing her singing skills. After finishing the course inside that institution, she successfully graduated as a Pop singer.

=== Music career ===
Soon after her graduation, the young singer started attracting the interest of some publishers. In 2010 she signed a contract with the Beijing-based record label; Dongjia Entertainment, in which she would release her first album entitled "The more lonely I am, the more I sing" (越唱越寂寞), an album characterized by a Teen pop and R&B sound combined with some Rock and mainstream pop songs. This album featured her first hit song, "All your wrong" (錯錯錯) which she sang as a duo with Liù zhé, a male singer who was also signed to the same company. The music video for this track accumulated 7 million views on YouTube.

One year after her debut, Jana released "You have just found me all alone" (你寂寞才找我) her second album in which she started moving away from her initial teen-pop style to a more mature pop-rock one. This time, Chen started taking part in TV programs and variety shows where she performed her songs.

In November 2011 she released a compilation album entitled "Listen to me singing a song" (聽我唱首歌) which contained her most famous songs till then and three new songs.

In 2012, Chen's career continued its rise. She took part in "Marvelous blue sky," a Zhejiang TV program, she started a solo tour and she also took part in the short film "Turn it into love" in which she had a short role.

In March 2013, the singer released her third studio album "Provocation" after two years out of the recording studios. This album not only follows the trend of her previous studio albums towards pop-rock music, but also developed a more sensual and sentimental style with songs talking mostly about sadness and sorrow.

In 2016, Jana, after another two-year hiatus, left her record label and signed a contract with the Guangzhou-based label; Shì zhōng shēng Media. After that, she increased her musical activity and released many single releases, music videos, a new studio album entitled "Coldness" (低溫交流) and two EPs.

== Discography ==
=== Studio albums ===
- The more lonely I am, the more I sing (2010)
- You have just found me all alone (2011)
- Provocation (2013)
- Coldness (2016)
- Rebirth (2017)

=== Compilation albums ===
- Listen to me singing a song (2011)

=== EPs ===
- Between you and me (April 20, 2016)
- Nothing is bad ( October 27, 2016)

=== Singles ===
- You never thought (August 8, 2016)
- Shadowy identity (September 5, 2016)
- You don't love me (September 24, 2016)
- Nothing is perfect (October 14, 2016)
- I'm busy (October 27, 2016)
