= Sanjiao, Meizhou =

Town in Meizhou, Guangdong, China

Coordinates: 24.2652°N 116.1154°E

- Simplified Chinese: 三角镇
Transcriptions
Standard Mandarin
- Hanyu Pinyin: Sānjiǎo Zhèn

Sanjiao is a town in the Meijiang District of Meizhou City, Guangdong Province, southern China.
