= Jiangbei, Meizhou =

Cinbese demographic area

Coordinates: 24.17385°N 116.021247°E

Jiangbei (Chinese: 江北; pinyin: Jiāngběi) is an area in the prefecture-level city of Meizhou, Guangdong. It is situated on the northern, left bank of the Mei River (梅江) as it flows downstream.

Jiangbei and Jiangnan, on the right bank, were long the urban core of Meixian District. Both areas were carved from the county according to the new systems of territorial administration after 1949.

The two areas are joined by many road and foot bridges. The syllable Jiang (江) in their names refers to the Mei River (Méi Jiāng in Pinyin), which forms a great ox-bow here.
