= Ning River =

River in China

Ning River (simplified Chinese: 宁江; traditional Chinese: 寧江; pinyin: Níng Jiāng) is a tributary of Mei River. It originates and runs through Xingning, China.

It was previously called Zuobie Creek (左别溪). Of Mei River's tributaries, Ning River has the greatest drainage basin. It starts in the north at Xunwu County's Hefeng She (荷峰畲) and goes south to Shuikouxu (水口圩). The river spans 107 km (66 mi).

== See also ==
- List of rivers of China
