= Mei River =

Coordinates: 24.406°N 116.57°E

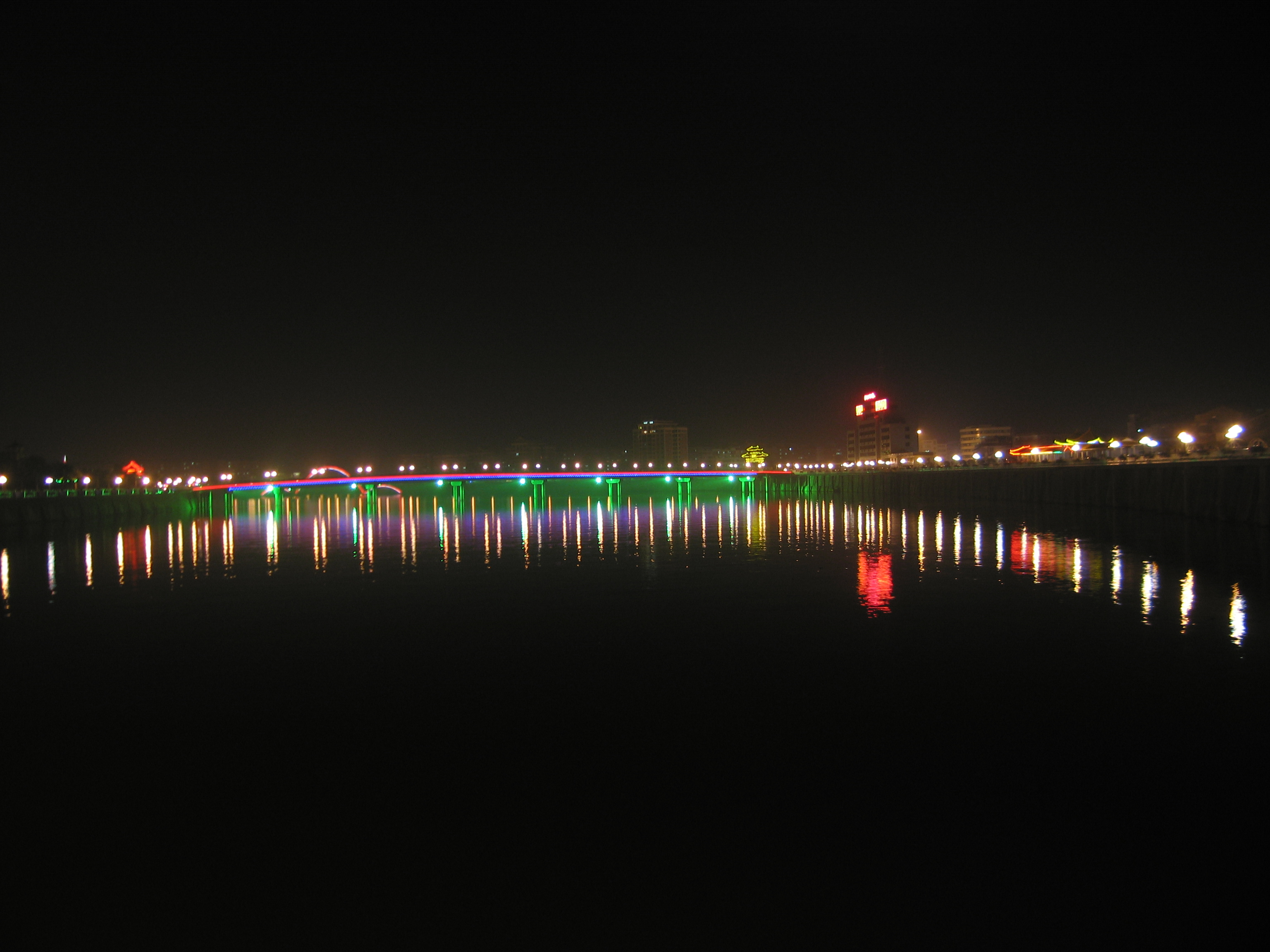
- Jianying Memorial Bridge over the river at night

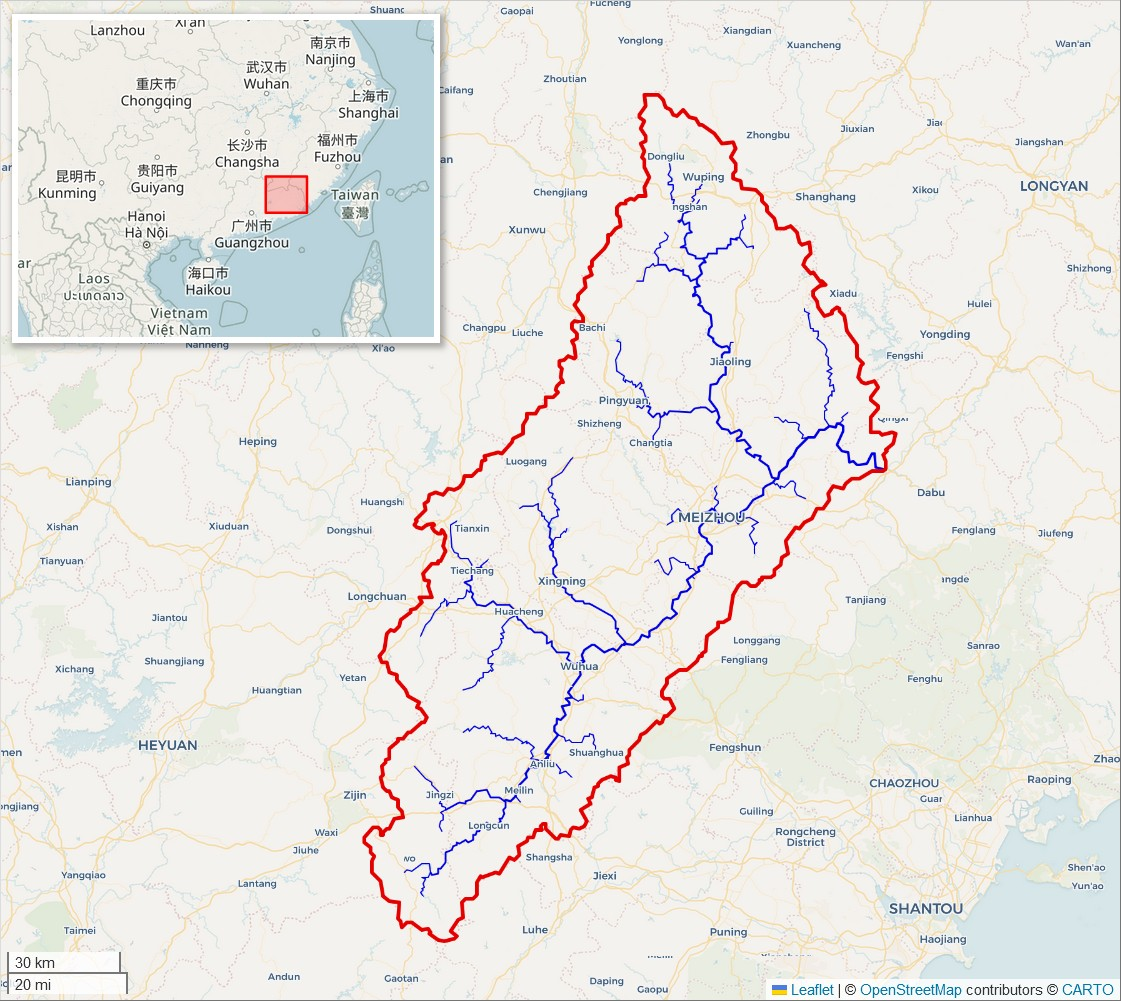
- Mei River watershed (Interactive map)

Location
- Country: China

Physical characteristics
- Basin size: 14,000 km²

The Mei River (Chinese: 梅江; pinyin: Méi Jiāng) is a river in Meizhou City in the eastern part of the Guangdong province in southern China and a tributary of the Han River.

Major bridges over it include the Jianying Memorial Bridge. It is formed by the confluence of the Wuhua River and the Qin River near the town of Hekoucun in Wuhua County.

Important tributaries include the Songyuan River, Shiku River, Zhou Xi River, Cheng River, and Ning River.
