= Meizhou =

Meizhou 梅州市 Mòichû
- Prefecture-level city
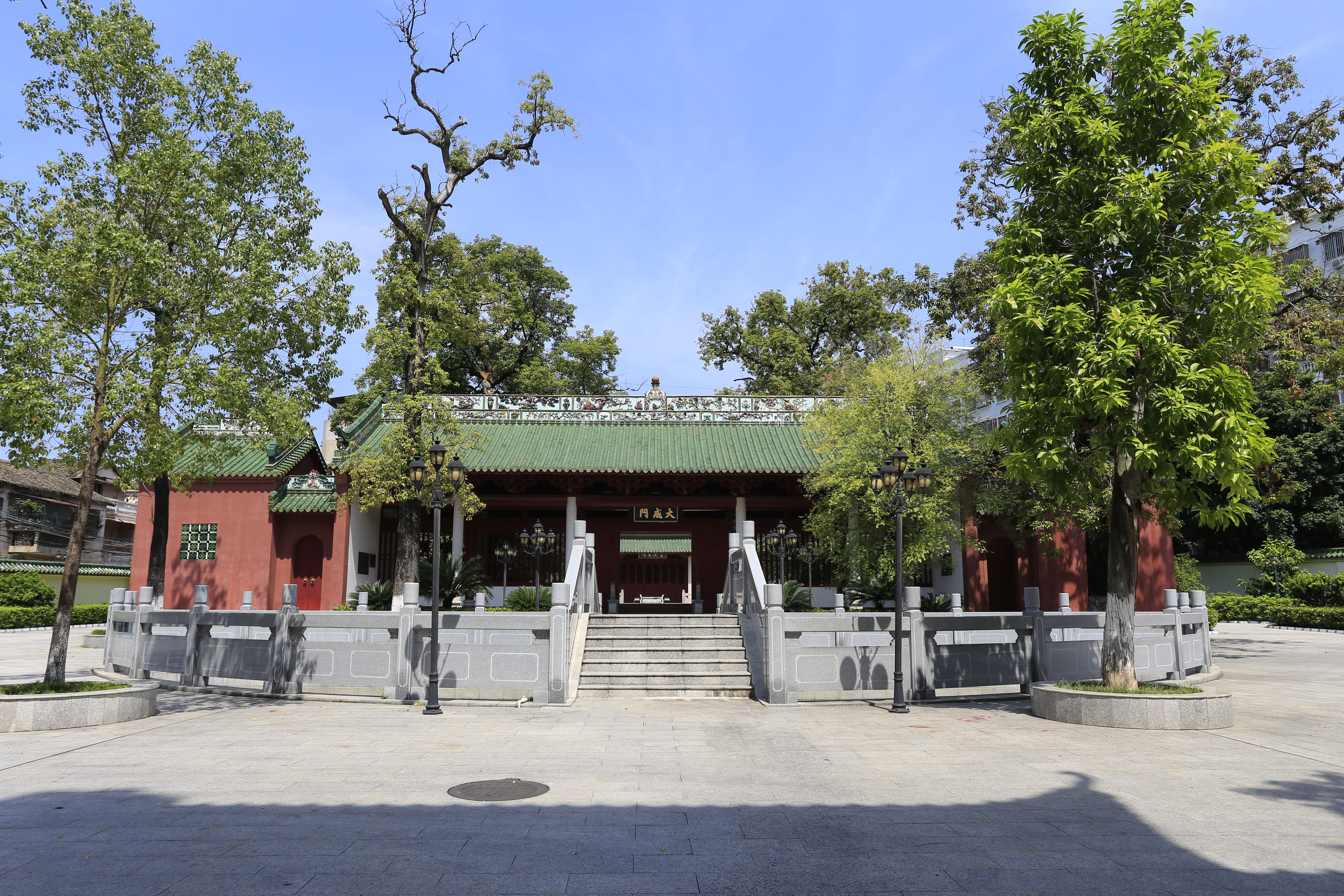
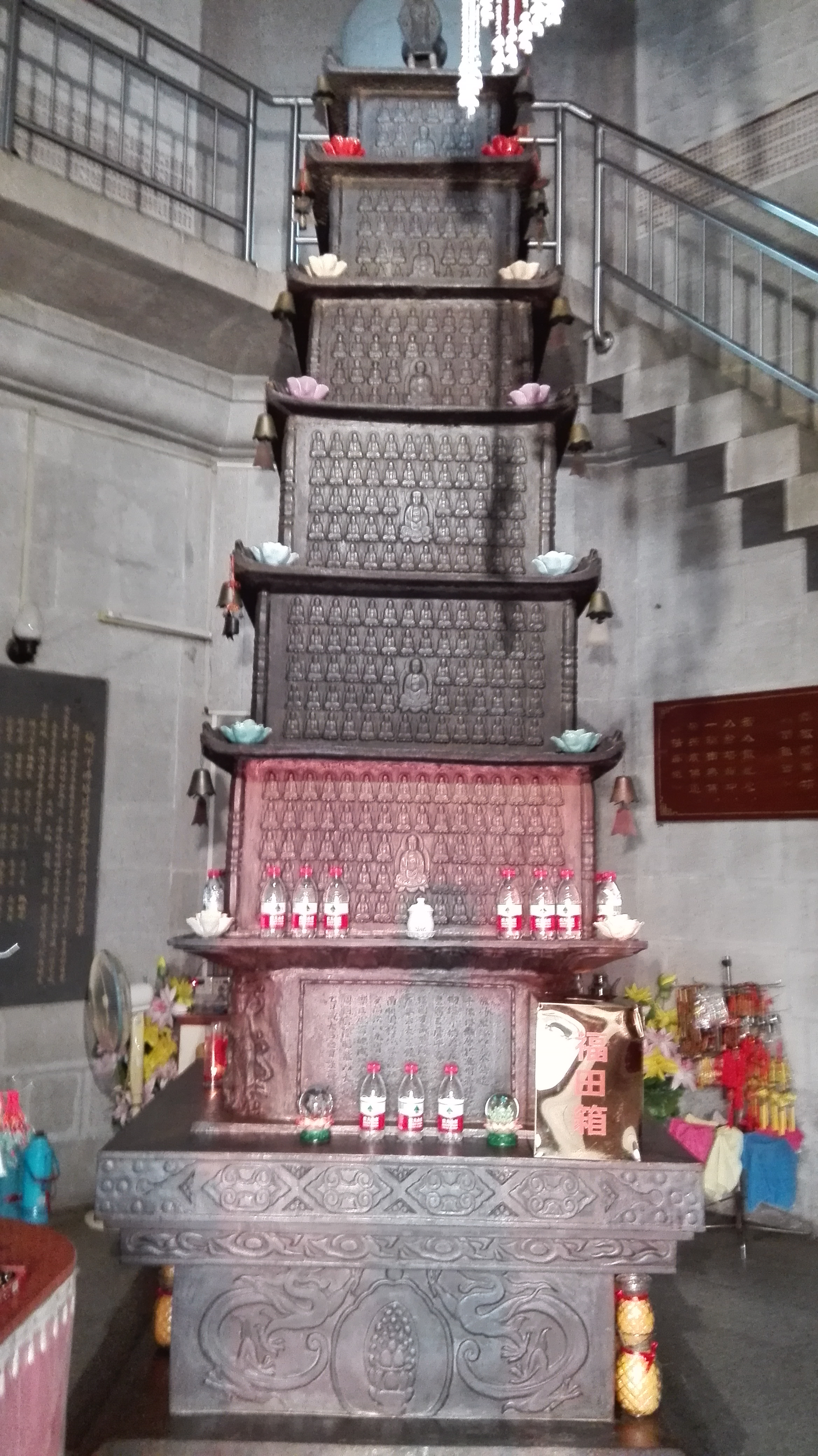
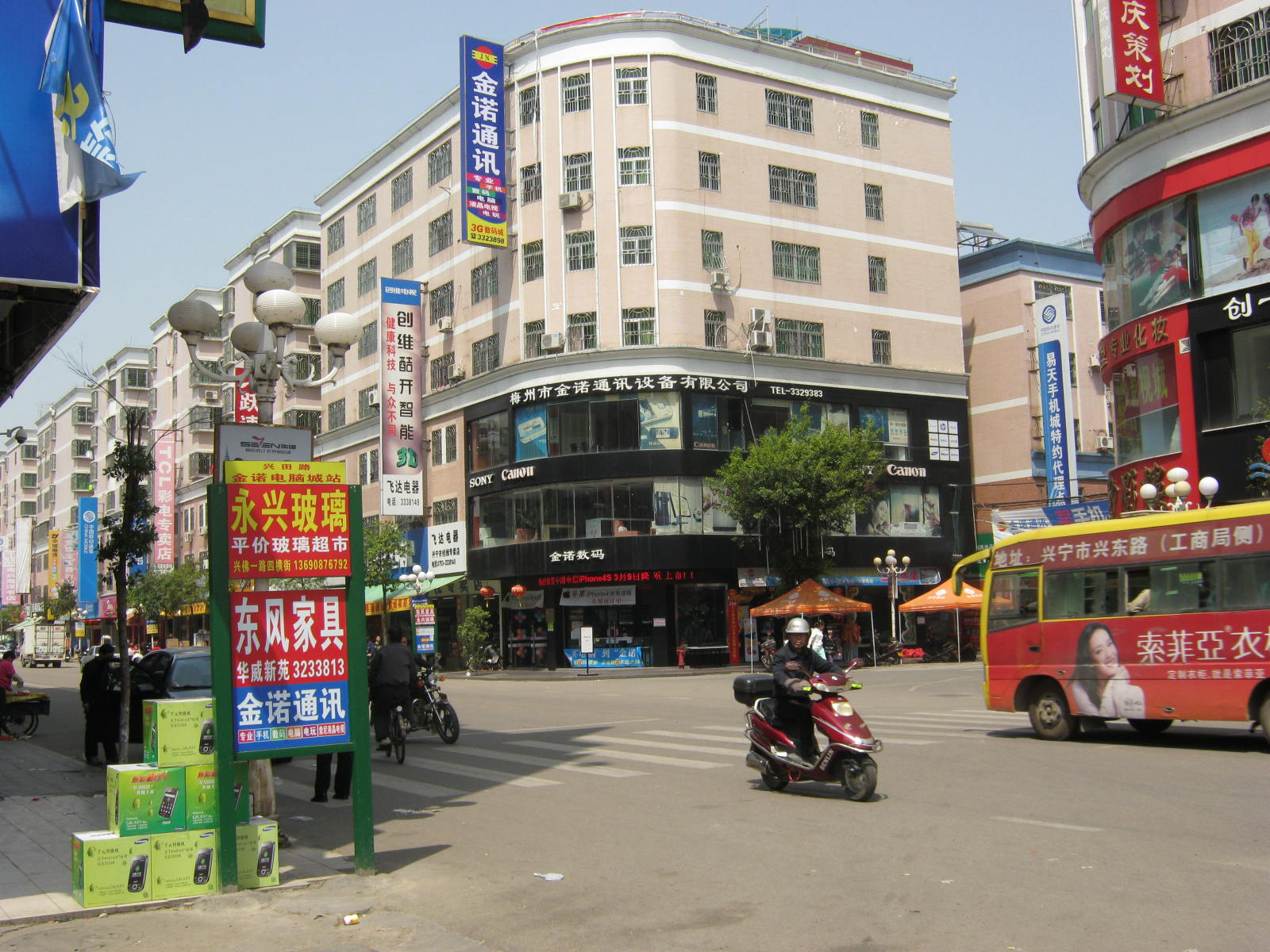
- Meizhou Confucian Temple Meizhou Buddhist Pagoda Xing Ning Street
- Nickname: Kezhou (客州)
- Motto: Capital of Hakkas in the World
- Interactive map of Meizhou
- Location of the city center in Guangdong Meizhou (China)
- Coordinates (Meizhou municipal government): 24°17′20″N 116°07′19″E
- Country: People's Republic of China
- Province: Guangdong
- Municipal seat: Meijiang District

Area
  - Prefecture-level city: 15,864.51 km^{2} (6,125.32 sq mi)
  - Urban: 3,047.5 km^{2} (1,176.6 sq mi)
  - Metro: 3,047.5 km^{2} (1,176.6 sq mi)
- Elevation: 96 m (315 ft)

Population (2020 census)
  - Prefecture-level city: 3,873,239
  - Density: 244.1449/km^{2} (632.3324/sq mi)
  - Urban: 992,351
  - Urban density: 325.63/km^{2} (843.37/sq mi)
  - Metro: 992,351
  - Metro density: 325.63/km^{2} (843.37/sq mi)
  - Major Nationalities: Han

GDP
  - Prefecture-level city: CN¥ 130.8 billion US$ 20.3 billion
  - Per capita: CN¥ 33,764; US$ 5,234
- Time zone: UTC+8 (China Standard)
- Postal Code: 514000
- Area code: 753
- ISO 3166 code: CN-GD-14
- License Plate Prefix: 粤M
- Languages: Standard Chinese (official); Hakka (regional)
- Website: www.meizhou.gov.cn (in Chinese)

Meizhou
- "Meizhou", as written in Chinese
- Chinese: 梅州
- Hakka: Mòi-chû
- Postal: Meichow (present); Meihsien (former); Kaying (former; pre-1912)
- Literal meaning: Plum/prune Prefecture
Transcriptions
Standard Mandarin
- Hanyu Pinyin: Méizhōu
Hakka
- Romanization: Mòi-chû
Yue: Cantonese
- Yale Romanization: Mùihjāu
- Jyutping: Mui4 zau1

Meizhou (Chinese: 梅州, Hakka Chinese: Mòichû) is a prefecture-level city in eastern Guangdong province, China. It has an area of 15,864.51 km^{2} (6,125.32 sq mi), and a population of 3,873,239 as of the 2020 census. It comprises Meijiang District, Meixian District, Xingning City and five counties. Its built-up or metro area made up of two urban districts was home to 992,351 inhabitants.

== History ==
Neolithic age stone tools and pottery have been discovered in dozens of places in the Meixian district of Meizhou. Ancient kiln sites from the Western Zhou dynasty and bells from the Warring States period were also found. Before the Qin dynasty, Meizhou was under Nanyue rule. After Qin unified the Nanyue, Meizhou was belonged to Nanhai Commandery.

Meizhou was historically known as Chengxiang (程鄉) and Jiaying (嘉應), and the local saying — "Before there was Meizhou, there was Jiaying; before there was Jiaying, there was Chengxiang" (未有梅州，先有嘉應；未有嘉應，先有程鄉) — summarizes the evolution of its place names.

From the Southern Qi empire through the early Republic, the region was called Chengxiang, because in the first year of Yongming (483 CE) the Southern Qi court carved out part of Haiyang County to establish Chengxiang County, marking the beginning of Meizhou's county‑level administration. According to tradition, the name "Chengxiang" commemorates the virtuous scholar Cheng Min (程旼), who lived in seclusion and taught in the area.

In the fourth year of the Northern Song's Kaibao era (971 CE), the region was reorganized as Meizhou, with Chengxiang County serving as the attached county of the prefectural seat. During the Ming dynasty, Meizhou Prefecture was once abolished, and Chengxiang County was placed under the jurisdiction of Chaozhou Prefecture and later Huizhou Prefecture.

The Imperially Commissioned Complete Collection of Ancient and Modern Books (欽定古今圖書集成, Geographical Compilation, Administrative Geography, Volume 1333, the entry for Chengxiang County summarized the history of Meizhou from Han-era to Ming dynasty:

Located three hundred miles northwest of the prefectural city. Originally part of Han‑era Jieyang County. During the Qi dynasty, Chengxiang County was established and placed under Yian Commandery. Under the Sui it belonged to Chaozhou. During the Southern Han, the county was elevated to Gongzhou. At the beginning of the Song, it was renamed Meizhou. In the Shaoxing period, it again became Chengxiang County under Chaozhou, and later reverted to Meizhou.

In the Yuan dynasty, during the Zhiyuan era, it was reorganized as Meizhou Circuit, and later restored as Meizhou, with its seat governing Chengxiang County. In the second year of the Ming Hongwu reign, the prefecture was abolished and merged into the county, which was organized into twenty‑one townships.

在府城西北三百里。本漢揭陽縣地。齊置程鄉縣，屬義安郡。隋屬潮州。南漢以縣為恭州。宋初，改曰梅州。紹興中，為程鄉縣，隸潮州，後復為梅州。元至元中，改置梅州路，後復為梅州，治程鄉縣。明洪武二年，省州入縣，編戶二十一里。

From the Qing dynasty (清朝) to the early Republic of China (民國初年), Meizhou was known as Jiaying. In the eleventh year of the Yongzheng reign (1733), Meizhou was separated from Chaozhou Prefecture and elevated by the Qing court to a directly governed prefecture, renamed Jiaying Prefecture (嘉應州) —a name expressing auspicious "favorable response." Jiaying Prefecture governed five counties: Chengxiang, Xingning, Changle (now Wuhua), Pingyuan, and Zhenping (now Jiaoling), collectively known in history as the "Five Counties of Jiaying" (嘉應五屬). The prefectural seat remained in Chengxiang County, corresponding to today's old urban core of Meizhou (the historic Jiaying city). To this day, the name "Jiaying" remains widely used in local institutions.

In the third year of the Republic of China (1914), the prefectural system was abolished, and Jiaying Prefecture was renamed Mei County, the name comes from the Mei River and the Chinese name for the plum blossom (梅; méi). The region has long enjoyed the elegant reputation of being the "Land of Plum Blossoms" (梅花之鄉). The Meizhou area is rich in plum varieties—green plums, white plums, and flowering plums. Each spring, the hillsides burst into bloom, offering not only beautiful scenery but also fruit that can be processed into preserved plums. Throughout history, Jiaying Prefecture (Meizhou) has maintained a deep cultural connection with the plum blossom.

After several subsequent shifts of jurisdiction, it became Meizhou City in 1988. Meizhou is now a noted historical and cultural city.

== Geography and climate ==
Meizhou is located in the northeast of Guangdong Province, bordering Fujian Province in the northeast and Jiangxi Province in the northwest. The complex geological structure was formed mainly from granite, spouting rocks, metamorphic rock, shale, sandstone, red rock and limestone.Its administrative area ranges in latitude from 23° 23' to 24° 56' N and in longitude from 115° 18' to 116° 56' E, covering an area of 15,836 km^{2} (6,114 sq mi).

Meizhou has a humid subtropical climate (Köppen Cfa), with short, mild, overcast winters and long, very hot, humid summers. The monthly daily average temperature in January is 12.6 °C (54.7 °F), and in July is 28.9 °C (84.0 °F). From April to June, rainfall is the heaviest and most frequent. Though striking typhoons do not affect the area as much as the coast, the mountainous topography means that flooding is a serious concern. Record temperatures in the city have raged from −7.3 °C (18.9 °F) on January 12, 1955 (lowest ever reliably recorded temperature in Guangdong Province) to 39.5 °C (103.1 °F) in July 25, 1971.

Climate data for Meizhou, elevation 116 m (381 ft), (1991–2020 normals, extremes 1952–2010)
| Month | Jan | Feb | Mar | Apr | May | Jun | Jul | Aug | Sep | Oct | Nov | Dec | Year |
|---|---|---|---|---|---|---|---|---|---|---|---|---|---|
| Record high °C (°F) | 29.5 (85.1) | 33.0 (91.4) | 33.4 (92.1) | 36.0 (96.8) | 37.4 (99.3) | 38.4 (101.1) | 39.5 (103.1) | 38.6 (101.5) | 38.0 (100.4) | 36.3 (97.3) | 34.8 (94.6) | 30.2 (86.4) | 39.5 (103.1) |
| Mean daily maximum °C (°F) | 18.5 (65.3) | 20.2 (68.4) | 22.9 (73.2) | 27.0 (80.6) | 30.3 (86.5) | 32.4 (90.3) | 34.3 (93.7) | 33.8 (92.8) | 32.4 (90.3) | 29.3 (84.7) | 25.2 (77.4) | 20.2 (68.4) | 27.2 (81.0) |
| Daily mean °C (°F) | 12.7 (54.9) | 14.8 (58.6) | 17.8 (64.0) | 22.0 (71.6) | 25.4 (77.7) | 27.5 (81.5) | 28.9 (84.0) | 28.4 (83.1) | 27.1 (80.8) | 23.7 (74.7) | 19.1 (66.4) | 14.1 (57.4) | 21.8 (71.2) |
| Mean daily minimum °C (°F) | 8.9 (48.0) | 11.1 (52.0) | 14.3 (57.7) | 18.4 (65.1) | 21.9 (71.4) | 24.3 (75.7) | 25.1 (77.2) | 24.9 (76.8) | 23.4 (74.1) | 19.5 (67.1) | 15.0 (59.0) | 10.1 (50.2) | 18.1 (64.5) |
| Record low °C (°F) | −7.3 (18.9) | −1.4 (29.5) | 0.3 (32.5) | 7.6 (45.7) | 13.4 (56.1) | 17.6 (63.7) | 20.5 (68.9) | 19.9 (67.8) | 15.1 (59.2) | 5.0 (41.0) | 0.4 (32.7) | −3.3 (26.1) | −7.3 (18.9) |
| Average precipitation mm (inches) | 55.8 (2.20) | 75.4 (2.97) | 142.2 (5.60) | 180.8 (7.12) | 199.6 (7.86) | 238.3 (9.38) | 151.2 (5.95) | 207.8 (8.18) | 112.7 (4.44) | 36.1 (1.42) | 42.6 (1.68) | 43.0 (1.69) | 1,485.5 (58.49) |
| Average precipitation days (≥ 0.1 mm) | 7.5 | 10.4 | 14.6 | 14.7 | 16.5 | 18.0 | 14.8 | 17.4 | 12.0 | 4.7 | 5.3 | 6.3 | 142.2 |
| Average relative humidity (%) | 74 | 76 | 78 | 78 | 78 | 80 | 75 | 78 | 76 | 71 | 72 | 72 | 76 |
| Mean monthly sunshine hours | 123.8 | 102.6 | 96.6 | 109.2 | 134.5 | 152.1 | 217.3 | 197.4 | 185.9 | 186.1 | 161.3 | 144.2 | 1,811 |
| Percentage possible sunshine | 37 | 32 | 26 | 29 | 33 | 37 | 52 | 49 | 51 | 52 | 49 | 44 | 41 |
Source 1: China Meteorological AdministrationPeriod of record start
Source 2: Weather China

== Administration ==
The municipal government, Intermediate Court, CPC office and Public Security Bureau are located in the Jiangnan Subdistrict of the Meijiang District, on the right bank of Mei River.

Map
| Name | Simplified Chinese | Hanyu Pinyin | Population (2010 census) | Area (km^{2}) | Density (/km^{2}) |
|---|---|---|---|---|---|
| Meijiang District | 梅江区 | Méijiāng Qū | 380,771 | 570.62 | 667 |
| Meixian District | 梅县区 | Méixiàn Qū | 554,745 | 2,476.87 | 224 |
| Dabu County | 大埔县 | Dàbù Xiàn | 374,666 | 2,461.82 | 152 |
| Fengshun County | 丰顺县 | Fēngshùn Xiàn | 478,974 | 2,706.34 | 177 |
| Wuhua County | 五华县 | Wǔhuá Xiàn | 1,050,528 | 3,237.83 | 324 |
| Pingyuan County | 平远县 | Píngyuǎn Xiàn | 230,045 | 1,373.98 | 167 |
| Jiaoling County | 蕉岭县 | Jiāolǐng Xiàn | 205,849 | 961.64 | 214 |
| Xingning | 兴宁市 | Xīngníng Shì | 962,883 | 2,075.39 | 464 |

== Economy ==
Meizhou is rich in mineral and tourism resources. It has 48 kinds of minerals including coal, iron, limestone, rare clay and porcelain clay amongst others. Of these reserves manganese is ranked first in Guangdong Province. Meizhou has plenty of water resources, hot springs and certified mineral waters. There are tourism resources such as cultural historic sites constructed during the Tang dynasty, former residences of notable figures, natural scenery of all kinds, and unique Hakka cultural sights.

== Transport ==
Meizhou is a communication hub for the three provinces of Guangdong, Fujian, and Jiangxi and the bridge connecting the coastal and the inland areas. State Highways 205 and 206 run across the city. Expressways, state, provincial county and village highways extend to all parts.

In 2019 the city became the terminus for the Meizhou–Chaoshan high-speed railway which opened a new station at Meizhou West providing high-speed rail links to Guangzhou, Zhuhai, Shenzhen, Shantou, Chaoshan, Yichang and Xiamen. The Guangzhou–Meizhou–Shantou railway and Meizhou-Kanshi Railway use Meizhou railway station in the city providing regular rail connections to Guangzhou, Xiamen, Shantou, Shenzhen, Dapu, Wuchang and Kunming.

The city is served by the regional Meizhou Meixian Airport, with regular air routes to Guangzhou and Hong Kong. By water, the Mei River and Han River reach Chaozhou and Shantou.

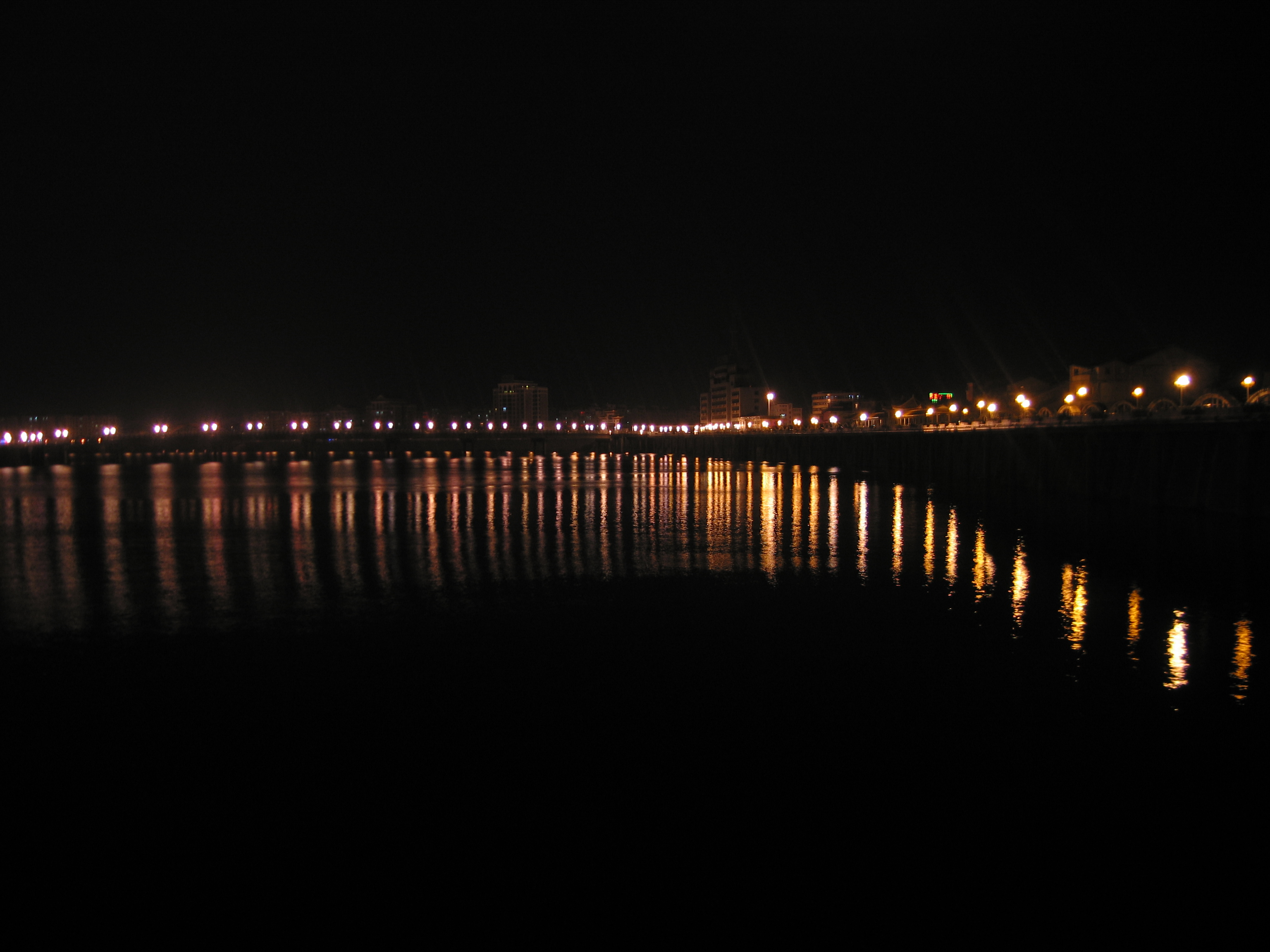
A view of the Mei River in Meizhou at night

== Culture ==
The Meixian dialect is considered the standard Hakka dialect, along with the neighboring Mei County and Dabu County.

Hakka people are a unique ethnic group of Han Chinese originally from around the Yellow River area, who later migrated south to avoid the chaos of war centuries ago. Due to hostility towards the new immigrants, many were forced into the mountainous regions of Guangdong Province. This migratory tradition has continued with the redistribution of Hakka people to the most remote parts of the world. Many people in Meizhou emigrated during the last century to earn money for their families, with some returning to build in their hometowns.

Many buildings are named after famous people in Meizhou, built by returning Hakkas and overseas diaspora Hakkas.

Because of its mountainous location, Meizhou has numerous natural scenic areas and good air quality. Many visitors come to the Yannanfei Tea Garden to climb the mountain.

== Education ==
Education in Meizhou has been highly valued since ancient times. The city is home to Jiaying University, a local university which also attracts Hakka students from other provinces. The university is also known for its research into Hakka culture.

== Food ==
During the period after August or September, a sea of pomelos can be seen, especially in village orchards.

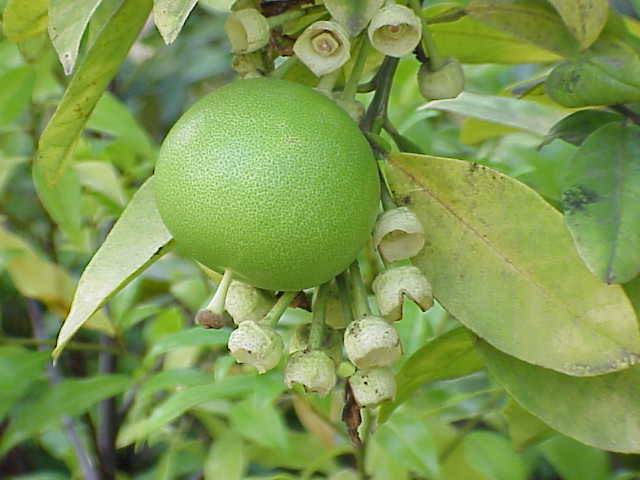
Pomelos

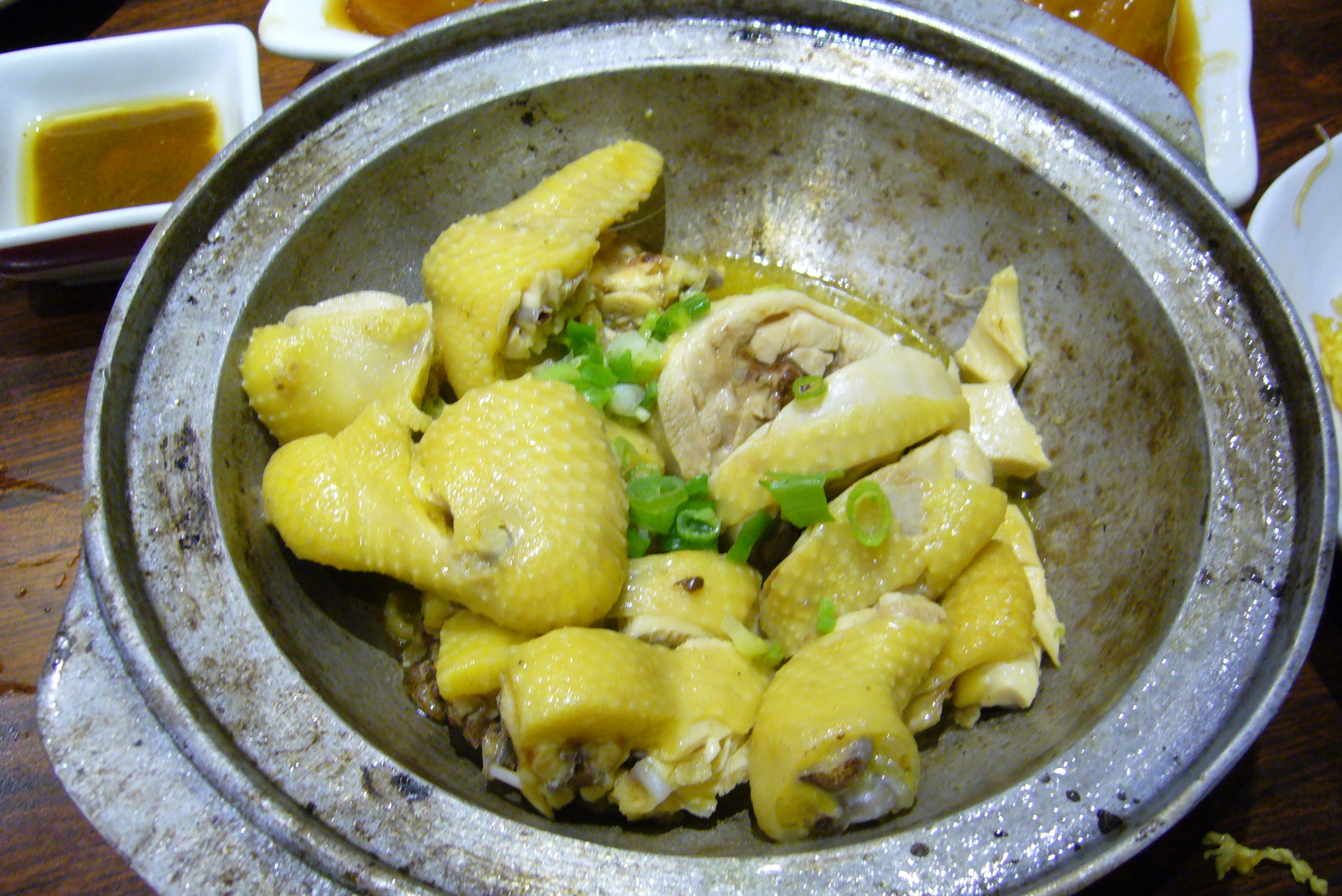
Salt baked chicken

Salt baked chicken is among the most well-known Hakka dishes, found also in many other cities. Another local dish is Yong tau foo (stuffed tofu). It is said that when Hakka people first came south, there was no wheat flour for dumplings. So they substituted tofu. Meat based fillings give a special taste that became a feature of Hakka cuisine. Preserved beef and ginger candies are also locally popular.

== Notable people ==
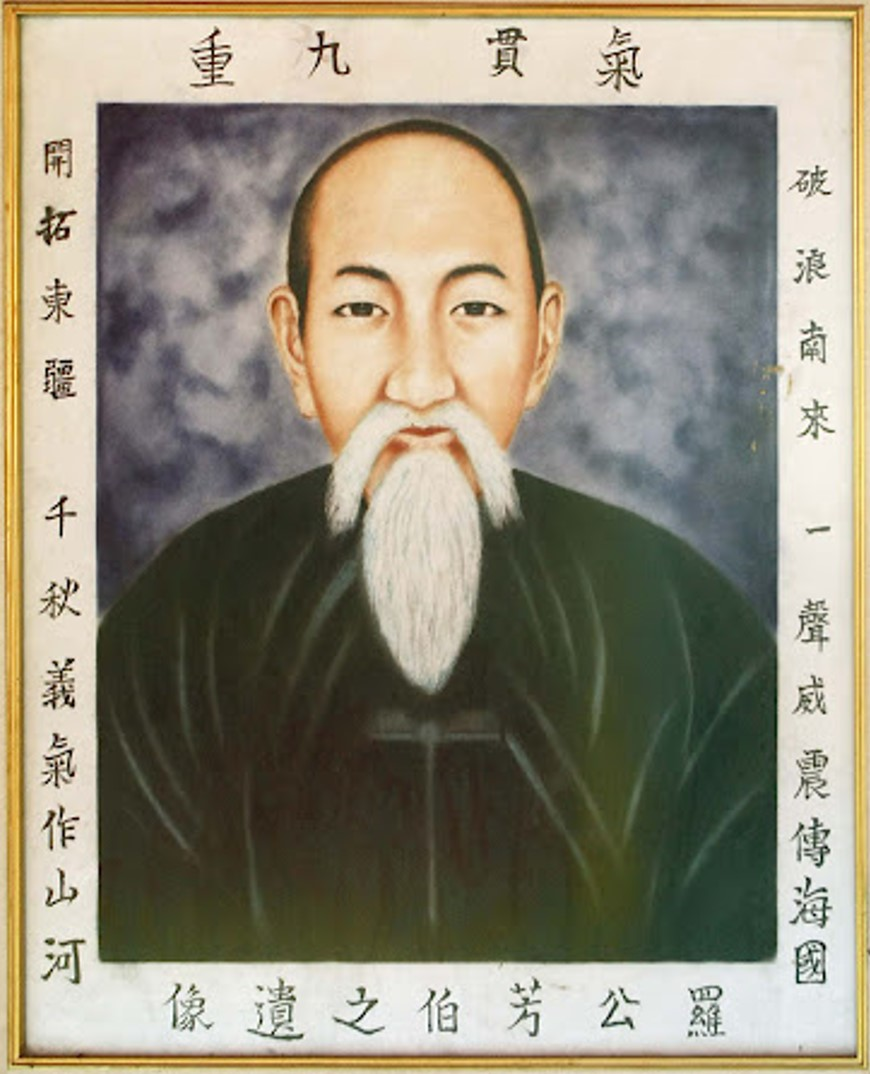
Low Lan Pak

- Low Lan Pak, founder of the Lanfang Republic and first Chinese person to be titled as 'President'.
- Tjong Yong Hian (1850–1911), Chinese Hakka kapitan governor of Medan.
- Tjong A Fie (1860–1921), Hakka Chinese businessman, banker and kapitan (Chinese major) who built a large plantation business in Sumatra, Indonesia.
- Huang Zunxian (1848–1905), diplomat and reformer
- Francis Xavier Ford (1892–1952), first Catholic bishop of Meizhou (Kaying)
- Xie Jinyuan (1905–1941), Chinese Nationalist military officer famous for commanding the Defense of Sihang Warehouse during the Battle of Shanghai in the Second World War.
- Seng Saekhu (c. 1840s–unknown), Thai Chinese tax farmer, the patriarch of the Shinawatra clan and the great-grandfather of Thaksin Shinawatra (Thai businessman, politician, visiting professor and former Prime Minister of Thailand) and Yingluck Shinawatra (Thai businesswoman, politician, member of the Pheu Thai Party and Thailand's first female prime minister).
- Ye Jianying (1897–1986), Chinese military general
- Lin Fengmian (1900–1991), painter
- Lee Wai Tong (1905–1979), Chinese footballer
- Arthur Chung (1918–2008), 1st President of Guyana
- Liu Fuzhi (1917–2013), Chinese politician
- Bolo Yeung (1946), Hong Kong bodybuilder, martial artist and actor
- Leslie Cheung (1956–2003), Hong Kong Cantopop singer
- Zhu Fenglian (1977), spokesperson of the Taiwan Affairs Office
- Chen Qiqiu (1978), former badminton player and currently a coach
- Liu Xijun (1988), singer
- Jana Chen (1989), singer
- Nathan Tjoe-A-On (2001), Indonesian footballer of Hakka ancestry

== Gallery ==
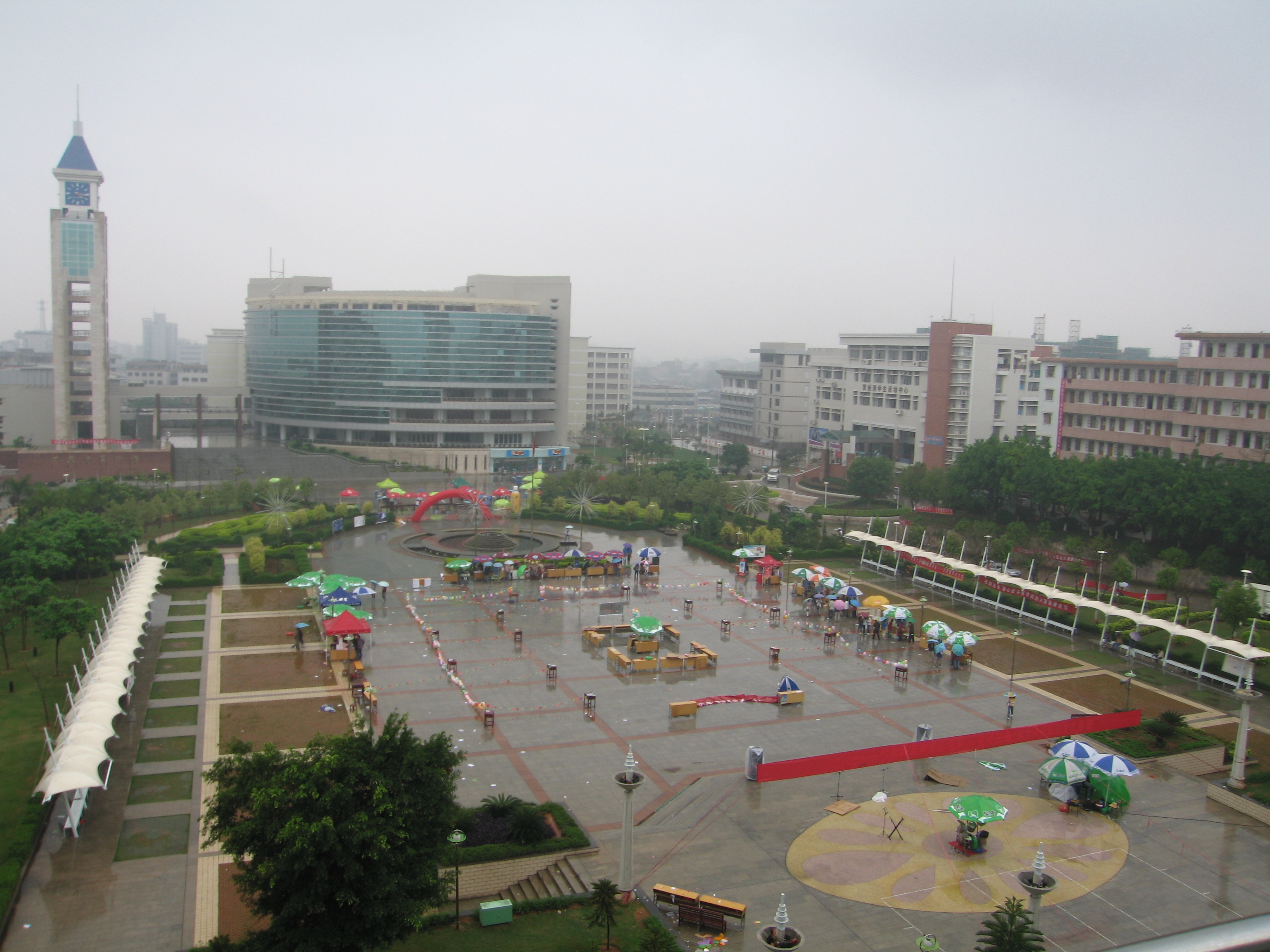
Jiaying University, Meizhou - New Century Square (located in the center of the main campus)

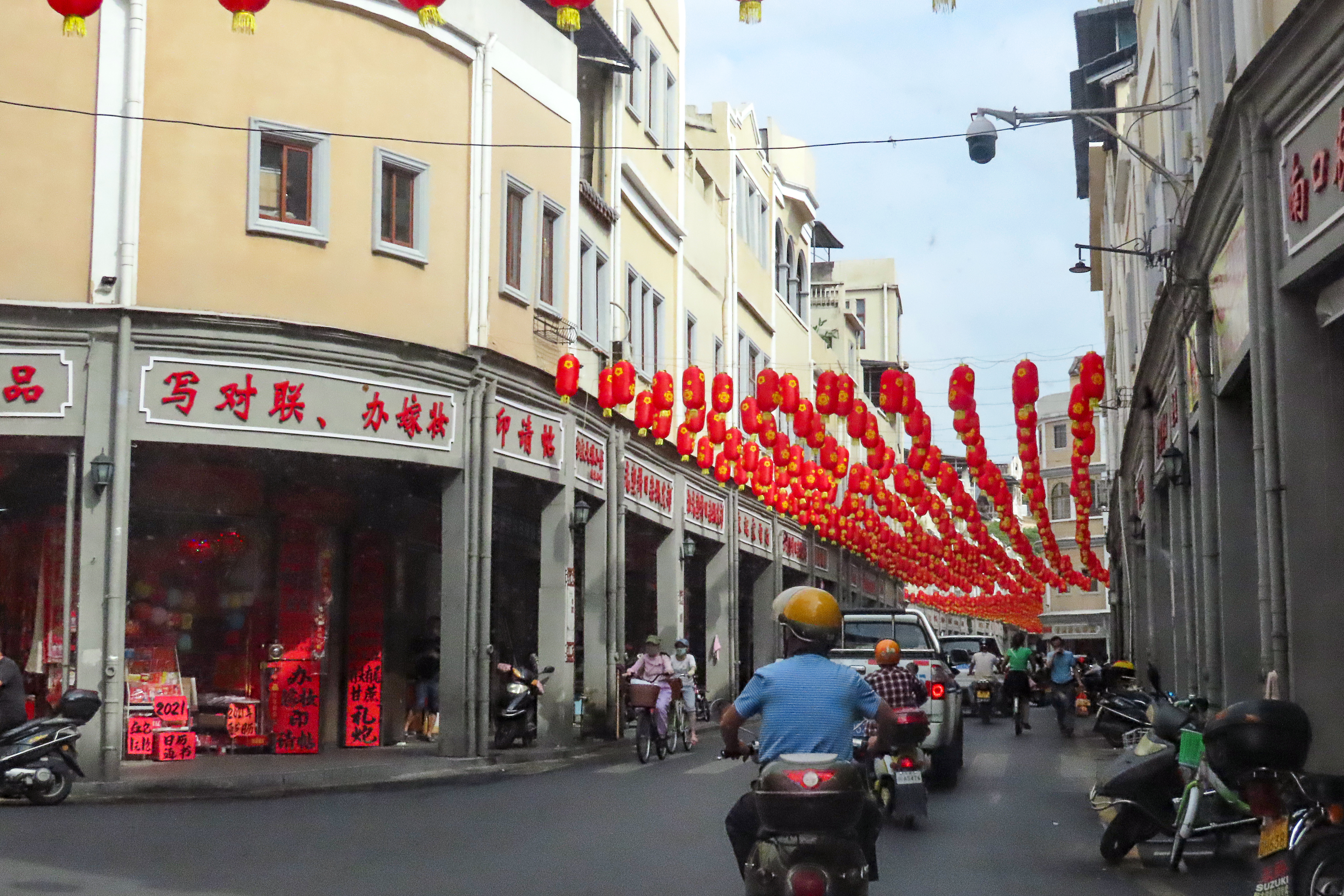
Youluo Street, Meizhou

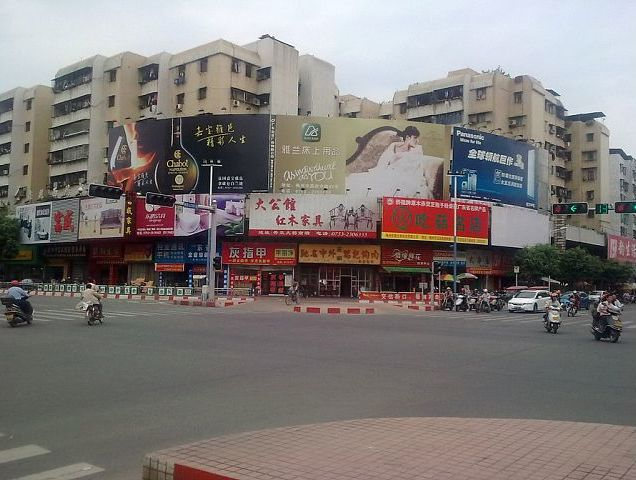
Meizhou street corner.

== Demographics ==
According to the Seventh National Census in 2020, the city's Permanent Population (hukou) was 3,873,239. Compared with 4240,139 in the Sixth National census in 2010, this represents a decrease of 366,900 people or 8.65 percent over the decade.Among the permanent residents of the city, the male population is 1952489, accounting for 50.41%; The female population was 1,920,750, or 49.59%. The sex ratio of the total population (100 females, male to female ratio) increased from 100.44 in the sixth National census in 2010 to 101.65.

== See also ==
- Hakka people
- Hakka cuisine
- Horn House
