= Xingning =

Xingning (simplified Chinese: 兴宁; traditional Chinese: 興寧) may refer to:

- Xingning, Guangdong, county-level city
- Xingning, Zixing (兴宁镇), a town of Zixing City, Hunan.
  - Xingning Academy, ancient structure in Xingning, Guangdong
  - Xingning Basin, located around Xingning, Guangdong
- Xingning District, Nanning, Guangxi
- Xingning era (363–365 CE), era name of the Emperor Ai of Jin
