= Xingtian (disambiguation) =

Xingtian is a Chinese deity.

Xingtian may also refer to:

- Xingtian Subdistrict
- Xingtian Temple, a temple in Zhongshan District, Taipei, Taiwan
- Xingtian Town (兴田镇), a town in Wuyishan City, the Prefecture-level city of Nanping, Fujian province, People's Republic of China
- Xingtian Township (兴田乡), a township in Fuliang County, Jiangxi province, People's Republic of China
- Xingtian Village (興田里), a village in Dashu District, Kaohsiung City, Taiwan
- Ma Xingtian (马兴田), a member of the Chinese Communist Party and real estate developer

== See also ==
- Xingtian Temple metro station, a metro station of the Taipei Metro
- Xingtianosaurus
- Xintian (disambiguation)
