= Jingnan (disambiguation) =

Jingnan (荊南) was a small kingdom during the 10th-century Five Dynasties and Ten Kingdoms period.

Jingnan may also refer to:

== Historical events ==
- Jingnan Rebellion (靖難之役), a civil war during the early Ming dynasty from 1399 to 1402

== Modern locations ==
- Jingnan, Guangdong (径南), a town in Xingning, Guangdong, China
- Jingnan, Guizhou (敬南), a town in Xingyi, Guizhou, China
- Jingnan, Guangxi (京南), a town in Cangwu County, Guangxi, China
- Jingnan Township (景南), a township in Jingning She Autonomous County, Zhejiang, China
