= Tengchow =

Tengchow may refer to the following cities in Shandong (Shantung), China:

- Penglai, formerly known as 'Dengzhou' in Chinese
- Tengzhou
