= Huangbei =

Huangbei may refer to:

- Huangbei Subdistrict, Luohu, Shenzhen, Guangdong, China
- Huangbei, Meizhou, town in Xingning City, Meizhou, Guangdong, China
- Huangbei, village in Xiaohe, Liuyang, Hunan, China
