= Nibei =

Nibei 坭陂镇
- Town
- Location in Guangdong
- Coordinates: 24°04′47″N 115°49′04″E
- Country: People's Republic of China
- Province: Guangdong
- Prefecture-level city: Meizhou
- County-level city: Xingning

Area
  - Total: 87.32 km^{2} (33.71 sq mi)

Population
  - Total: 82,000
  - Density: 940/km^{2} (2,400/sq mi)
- Time zone: UTC+8 (China Standard)
- Postal code: 514500
- Area code: 0753

Nibei is a town located in the south-central part of Xingning City, Meizhou, eastern Guangdong Province, China. It borders Diaofang (刁坊镇) to the west and Xinxu (新圩镇) to the east. It annexed the town of Libei in 2004. It has administrative responsibility for 18 villages, and covers an area of 87.32 km^{2} (33.71 sq mi) with a population of more than 82,000.

== Education ==
There are many elementary schools and four middle schools: Nibei Middle School, Beidong Middle School, Beixi Middle School and Jiping Middle School.

== Culture ==
The third, sixth, and ninth day of the three successive ten days of a month are days for trade. On these days, the villagers will go to downtown to buy commodities. It is especially crowded on festival days. Hakka-style fermented bean curd, Yong tau foo (Chinese: 酿豆腐; pinyin: niàng dòufu) is a popular dish, cooked differently from normal tofu dishes. The ingredients of the stuffing only require minced pork or fish. It is not fried all over, but only at the bottom or steamed It is usually served as the main food during Spring Festival.
