= Tianxin =

Tianxin or Tian Xin may refer to:

== Places ==
- Tianxin, Longchuan (田心镇), a town in Longchuan County, Guangdong, China
- Tianxin, Zhuzhou (田心街道), a subdistrict of Shifeng District, Zhuzhou, Hunan, China
- Tianxin District (天心区), a district of Changsha City, Hunan, China

== People ==
- Tian Xin (born 1998), Chinese footballer
- Tian Xin (actress) (born 1975), Taiwanese actress
