= Tianxin, Longchuan =

Town in Longchuan, Guangdong, China

Tianxin 田心镇
- Town
- Location in Guangdong
- Country: People's Republic of China
- Province: Guangdong
- Prefecture-level city: Heyuan
- County: Longchuan

Area
  - Total: 88.2 km^{2} (34.1 sq mi)

Population
  - Total: 39,000
  - Density: 440/km^{2} (1,100/sq mi)
- Time zone: UTC+8 (China Standard)

Tianxin is a small town of Longchuan County, Heyuan City, Guangdong Province, China. It is located in east-central part of Longchuan County, upstream of the Han River, with Xingning Town and Huilong Town to its east, Shikeng Town and Tiechang Town to its south, and Chiguang Town to its north. Tianxin was set up as a district in November 1983, and a town in 1990 to now. It has higher topography in the northeast and lower in the southwest, with a chain of undulating hills.

Tianxin has a total area of 88.2 square kilometers, including mountain area of 92000 mu, the cultivated land of 21400 mu. It has a total population of 39,000 people, 6,742 households, total workforce of 16,103 people, including non-agricultural population of 3,260 people, a population of 6,908 people year round. The Town office of Tianxin is located in Yangguangtou, Tianxin Village, 42 kilometers away from the county. It has a planning area of 2.5 square kilometers for street scene, 1.1 square kilometers having been built, with 3,018 existing residents.

== Industry ==
Tianxin has rapid industrial development, especially on promotion of investment and introduction of capital. The Gukengtang industrial park covers an area of tens of thousands acres. The town now has eight foreign processing enterprises which recommend Lantian Plastic Electronics Factory, with factory workers more than 500 people.

== Agriculture ==
Tianxin constantly strengthens its agricultural infrastructure construction. Comprehensive improvement of "Dayu Cup" Project covers "mountain, water, fields, forests, roads", it fundamentally improves agricultural plant conditions. The whole town has 12 small reservoirs, with a water area of 2,000 mu and total fish farming area of 900 mu. Forest coverage rate of the whole town reaches 98.2%, towarding to agriculturally ecological balance. The planting fruit area of the town is 2000 mu, including Tianbei Fruit Farm 250 mu, Shangzhai Fruit Farm 110 acres, Huangshatang Fruit Farm 1,001 mu, Changkeng Fruit Farm 120 mu, Tafeng Fruit Farm 300 mu, etc.

== Transportation, communications and energy sources ==
Hardware infrastructure is flourished here, with transit highway six kilometers, cement county roads 21 kilometers, village roads 14 kilometers. The whole town owns 4,500 assembly call. The town had built a substation of 35 kva, and a 110 - kilovolt transformer substation construction project has been settled in this town. It is ready to start building at chosen site. 81% of the farmers have concrete building in the town.

== Living standards ==
Estimatedly, at the end of December 2004, there was 210 vehicles, 4,050 motorcycles, 5,018 colored television sets, 210 sets of home computers, 3,100 mobile phones in the town. The rural credit savings rose sharply, the quality of people's life were improved substantially.

== Featured products ==
Tianxin features several local specialty products, including Umai, Huoshan sweet tea, Ganpi brown beds, Changkeng bamboo hats, and Dongkeng rice wine.

Local tourist attractions comprise Huoshan Mountain, the thousand-year-old Tafeng Tower, Pijiao Tower, and a designated She ethnic minority tourism area. An additional development site is the Xianniang Hole in Tafeng, a natural mineral water spring associated with local folklore regarding the emergence of notable figures. Historically, the village has produced prominent scholars, including Wusanzhu, a top imperial scholar during the Qianlong Emperor's reign in the Qing dynasty, as well as subsequent students admitted to Tsinghua University and Peking University following the establishment of the People's Republic of China.
