= Shuikou =

Shuikou may refer to:

- Shuikou, Meizhou, a town in Xingning City, Meizhou, Guangdong Province, China
- Shuikou, Yanling, a town in Yanling County, Huzhou, Hunan Province, China
- Shuikou, Gutian, a town in Gutian County, Ningde, Fujian Province, China
- Shuikou, Dehua, a town in Dehua County, Quanzhou, Fujian Province, China
- Shuikou, Kaiping, a town in Kaiping City, Jiangmen, Guangdong Province, China
- Shuikou, Chongzuo, a town in Longzhou County, Chongzuo, Guangxi Zhuang Autonomous Region, China
- Shuikou, Liping, a town in Liping County, Qiandongnan Miao and Dong Autonomous Prefecture, Guizhou, China
- Shuikou, Suining, a town in Suining County, Shaoyang, Hunan Province, China
- Shuikou, Binzhou, a town in Binzhou City, Xianyang, Shaanxi Province, China
- Shuikou, Changxing, a township in Changxing County, Huzhou, Zhejiang Province, China

== See also ==
- Shuikou Dam, Fujian Province, China
