= Laolong =

Laolong 老隆镇
- Town
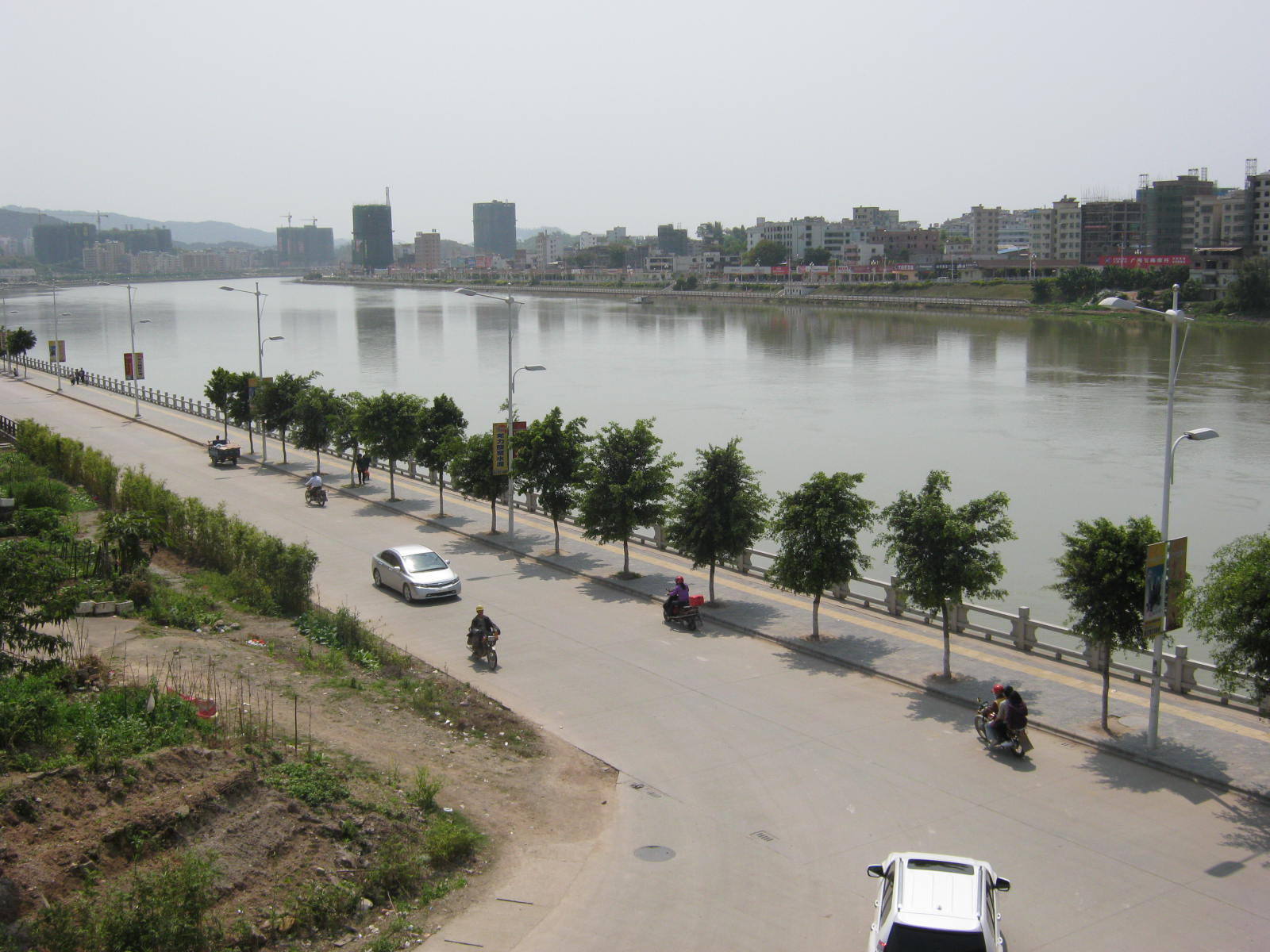
- Interactive map of Laolong
- Coordinates: 24.1017°N 115.2593°E
- Country: China
- Province: Guangdong
- Prefecture-level city: Heyuan
- county: Longchuan
- Seat: Longchuan County (龙川镇)

Area
  - Total: 15.4 km^{2} (5.9 sq mi)

Population
  - Total: 120,000
- Postal code: 517300
- Area code: 0762
- Website: longchuan.gov.cn

Laolong Town (Chinese: 老隆镇) is a settlement located in the northwestern part of Longchuan County, in northwestern Guangdong Province in China. Around 120,000 people live in Laolong town, which is the economic, political and transportation hub of the county. The town covers over 15 square kilometers. Laolong is surrounded on three sides by mountains and faces the East River in the west.

== History ==
In ancient China, Laolong was a trading and market town. During the Qing dynasty, it was a fort defended tenaciously by Zhao Tuo.

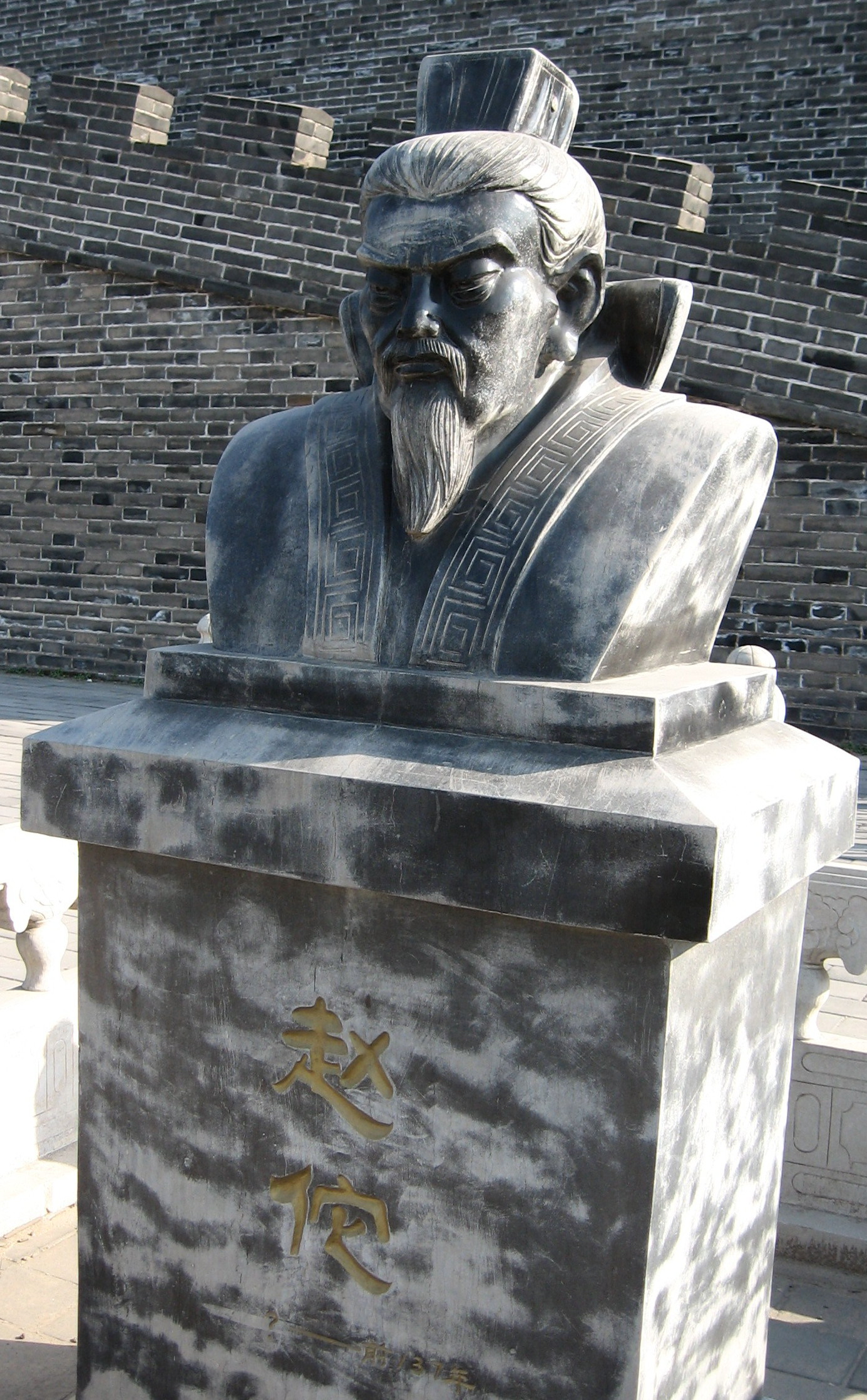
A statue of Zhao Tuo

The name of the town was changed to different Chinese characters, although the pronunciation did not change.

The government of Longchuan County was based in Laolong town for 65 years.

== Language and Culture ==
The most widespread dialect in Laolong is a regional variation of Hakka Chinese. Historically, the Shan'ge (also called Hakka hill songs) were popular in Laolong and older men and women would walk along the river singing in the mornings. The Shan'ge are often sung in duet with improvised lyrics.

== Economy ==
The economy of Laolong has developed rapidly in recent years. In 2004, the GDP of Laolong was about RMB 6.13 billion. This includes industrial output of about 3.33 billion, agricultural output of about RMB751 million and tertiary industry of about RMB 2.73 billion. Fiscal revenue is about RMB 461 million, while the rural per capita net income (PCNIRH) is about 5586 yuan.

== Transport ==
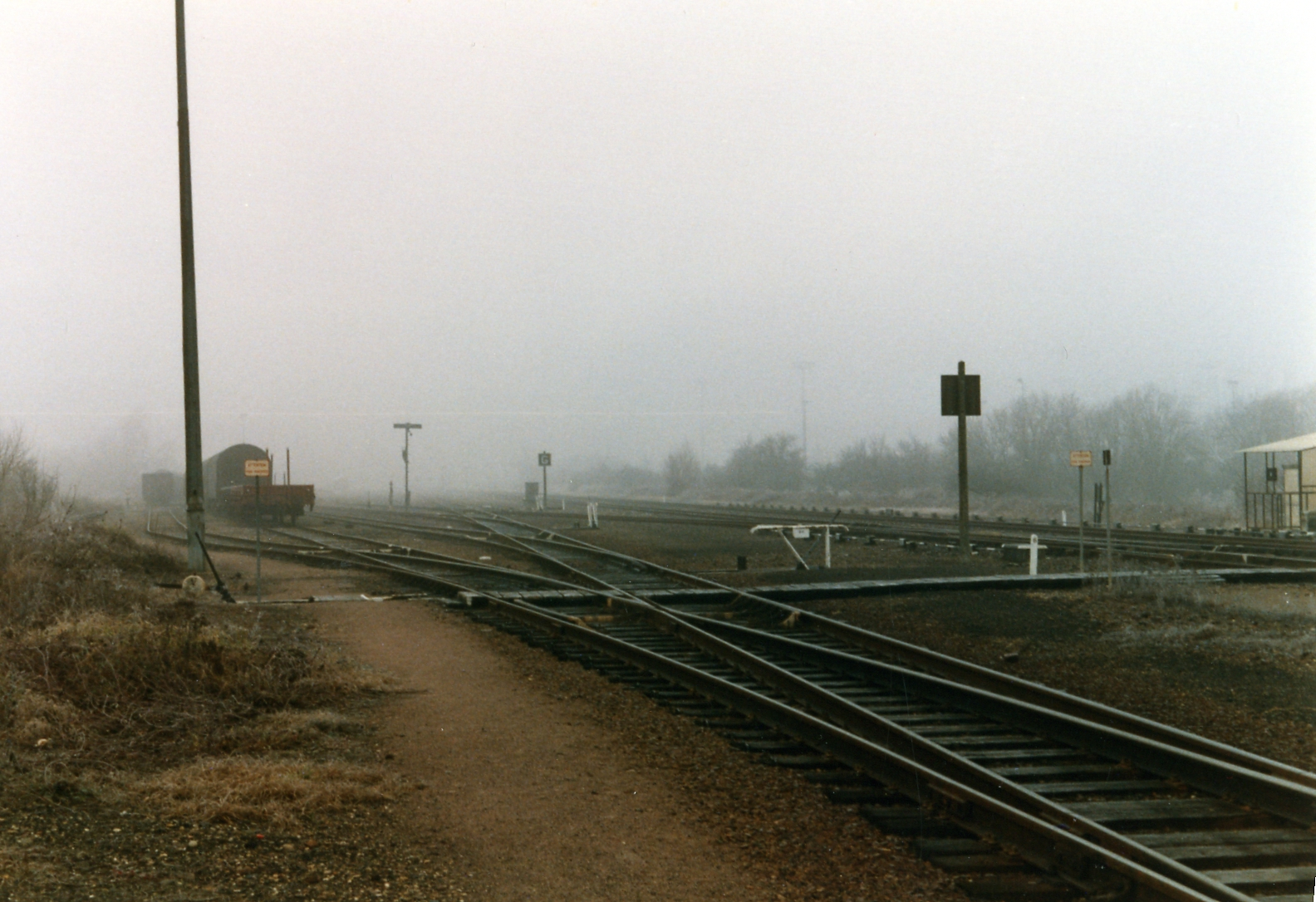
Railway

As the center of Longchuan County, the transportation system is more extensive than other nearby towns. Major roads include the China National Highway 205 (G205) and Guangdong Provincial Highway 120 (S120). The Beijing–Kowloon, Guangzhou–Meizhou–Shantou and Zhangping–Longchuan railways intersect in Longchuan, making it an important railway hub for the Lingnan region.

Three rail stations and three public transit bus routes operate in Laolong.

== Population ==
The population of Laolong town is about 120,000.

Population Structures	Quantity
Total Population	62596
Male	31322
Female	31274
Family Households	16353
Family-household (total)	59016
Family-household Male	29559
Family-household Female	29457
Age 0-14 (total)	14341
Age 0-14 Boys	7918
Age 0-14 Girls	6423
Age 15-64 (total)	44561
Age 15-64 Male	21714
Age 15-64 Female	22847
Over 65 years old (total)	3694
Over 65 years old (Male)	1690
Over 65 years old (Female)	2004
Account and Live in locality	51001
