= Shenguang Mountain =

Mountain in Guangdong, China

Shenguang Mountain (Chinese: 神光山; pinyin: Shēnguāngshān) is a hill located south of Xingning, China. The name comes from the Shenguang Temple there. ("Shenguang" in Chinese means halo, or a place of gods.)
