= Xinbei, Meizhou =

Town in Xingning, Guangdong, China

Coordinates: 24.1551°N 115.6967°E

- Simplified Chinese: 新陂镇
Transcriptions
Standard Mandarin
- Hanyu Pinyin: Xīnbēi Zhèn

Xinbei is a town under the jurisdiction of Xingning City, Meizhou, in eastern Guangdong Province, China.
