= Yonghe, Meizhou =

Town in Meizhou, Guangdong, China

Coordinates: 24.1438°N 115.8039°E

- Simplified Chinese: 永和镇
Transcriptions
Standard Mandarin
- Hanyu Pinyin: Yǒnghé zhèn

Yonghe is a town under the jurisdiction of Xingning City, Meizhou, in eastern Guangdong Province, China.
