= Luogang, Meizhou =

Town in Xingning, Guangdong, China

Coordinates: 24.4232°N 115.6383°E

- Simplified Chinese: 罗岗镇
Transcriptions
Standard Mandarin
- Hanyu Pinyin: Luōgǎng Zhèn

Luogang is a town under the jurisdiction of Xingning City, Meizhou, in eastern Guangdong Province, China.
