= Heshui, Meizhou =

Town in Xingning, Guangdong, China

Coordinates: 24.2495°N 115.7034°E

- Simplified Chinese: 合水镇
Transcriptions
Standard Mandarin
- Hanyu Pinyin: Héshuǐ Zhèn

Heshui is a town under the jurisdiction of Xingning City, Meizhou, in eastern Guangdong Province, China.
