= Ningzhong, Meizhou =

Town in Xingning, Guangdong, China

Coordinates: 24.1543°N 115.7436°E

- Simplified Chinese: 宁中镇
Transcriptions
Standard Mandarin
- Hanyu Pinyin: Níngzhòng zhèn

Ningzhong is a town under the jurisdiction of Xingning City, Meizhou, in eastern Guangdong Province, China.
