= Xinwei, Meizhou =

Town in Meizhou, Guangdong, China

Coordinates: 24.055948°N 115.864869°E

- Simplified Chinese: 新圩镇
Transcriptions
Standard Mandarin
- Hanyu Pinyin: Xīnwéi Zhèn

Xinwei is a town under the jurisdiction of Xingning City, Meizhou, in eastern Guangdong Province, China.
