= Shima, Meizhou =

Town in Xingning, Guangdong, China

Coordinates: 24°17′06″N 115°49′41″E

- Simplified Chinese: 石马镇
Transcriptions
Standard Mandarin
- Hanyu Pinyin: Shímǎ Zhèn

Shima is a town under the jurisdiction of Xingning City, Meizhou, in eastern Guangdong Province, China. The town has an area of 44.46 square kilometres (17.17 sq mi) and a population of 36 thousand.

The name of the town "Shima", meaning "Rock Horse" in Chinese, is named by a rock like a horse going down the hill near the region.
