= Niujingao =

Sweet Chinese rice cake

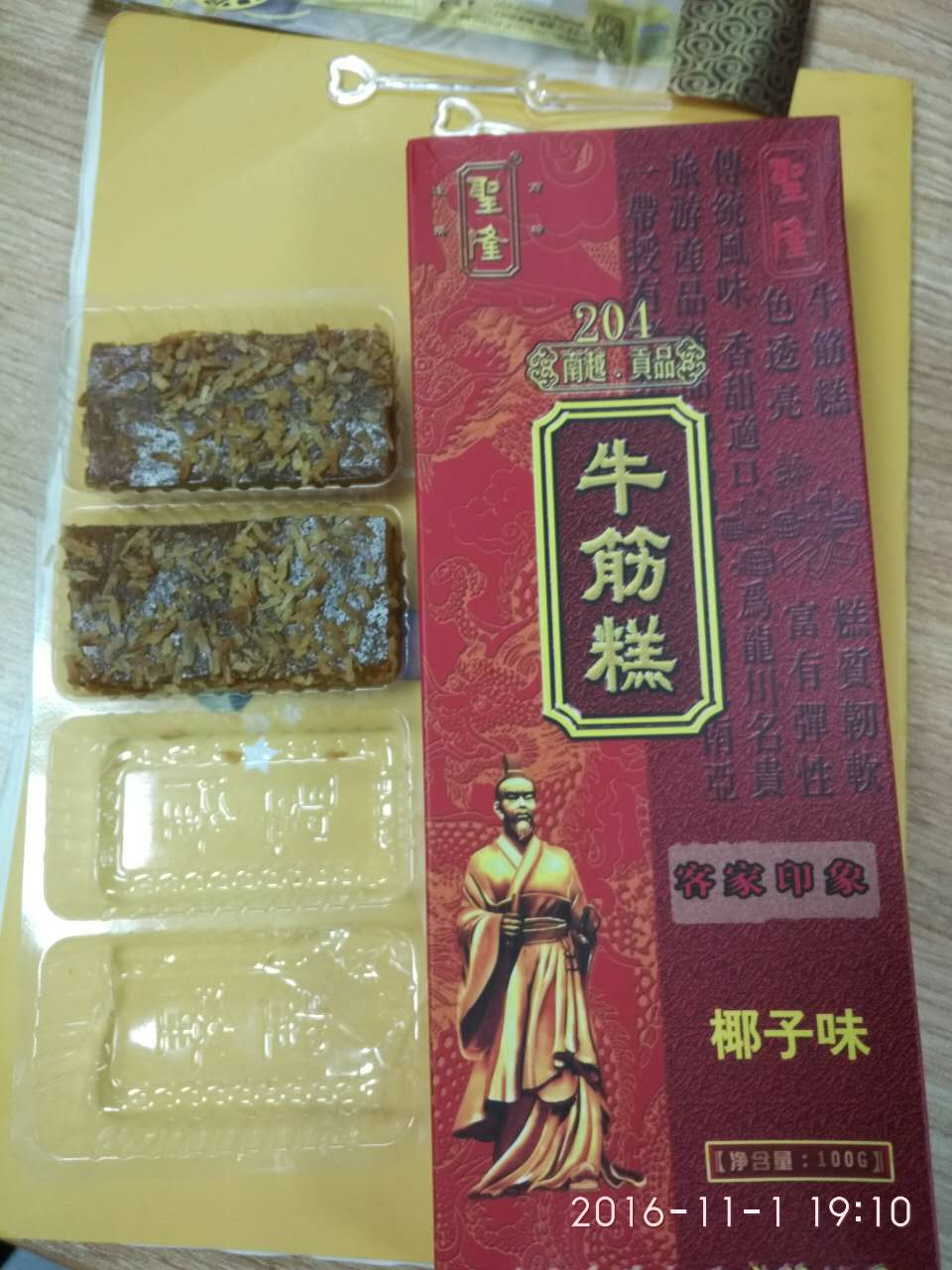
Niujingao

Niujingao (Chinese: 牛筋糕; pinyin: niújīngāo; lit. 'beef tendon cake') is a cake made from glutinous rice flour and sugar. It is regarded as a specialty of Longchuan County, Guangdong Province, China.

== Origins ==
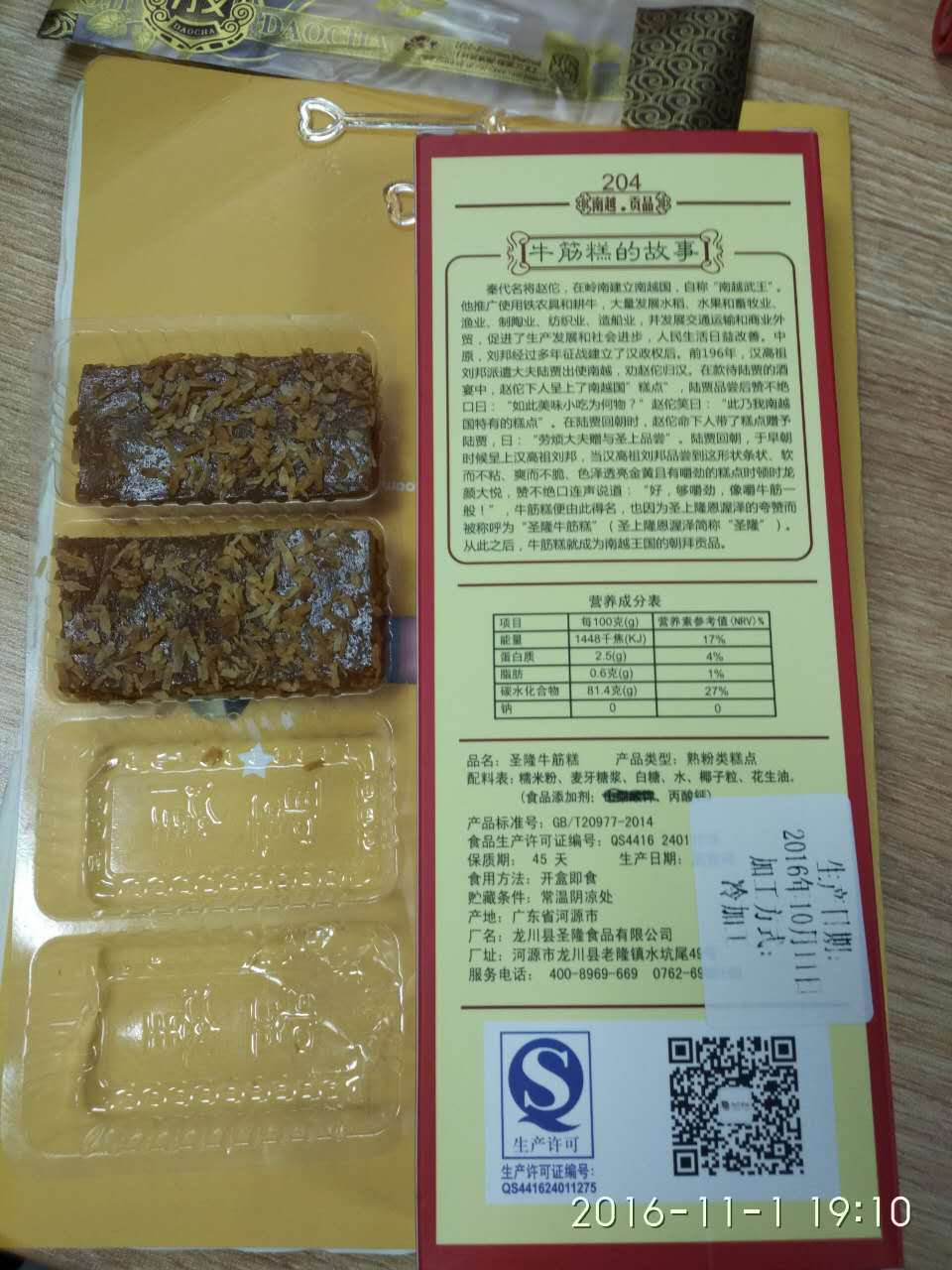
Back of package

As a traditional food, niujingao has a long history in Longchuan County. There are two legends about its origin.

=== Qin dynasty ===
It is believed that niujingao was invented during the Qin dynasty. At that time, Zhao Tuo ruled the ancient kingdom of Nanyue. After Liu Bang destroyed the Qin dynasty he sent an emissary, Lu Jia, to persuade Zhao Tuo to surrender. At a banquet for Lu Jia, Zhao Tuo ordered his servants to present him a special cake. After tasting it, Lu Jia asked what the delicious cake was; Zhao Tuo replied that it was a Nanyue specialty.

Because Lu Jia liked the cake, Zhao Tuo gave him many cakes to bring back to Liu Bang. When he reached the Qin capital, Lu Jia presented the specialty to the emperor and the cake became the most popular dish in Nanyue.

=== A magician's invention ===
Several hundred years ago, a magician who could no longer earn a living with his magic decided to become a baker. With the help of his wife, he created a special cake and opened a pastry shop. Although their cake was delicious, few people knew about the shop and the magician-turned-baker still could not earn a living. His wife found a solution: the magician should combine his skills, using magic to attract customers. Although the magician tried to use magic to make the cake attractive, people came to see the magic and left. Still struggling to earn a living, he tried another approach: to use the name of the cake.

The next morning, passersby were surprised to see a cow at the door of his shop and a notice on the wall saying that he could make a delicious cake from a cow's tendon. Although the people were skeptical, the magician did what he said and the cake was delicious. He acquired more and more customers and became wealthy, and the cake became known as niujingao ("beef tendon cake").

== Development ==
As a Longchuan County specialty, these cakes are often bought to give to friends or relatives at a visit, especially during festivals. The recipe for niujingao is owned by the Laolong Niujingao Company, which originally hand-made the cakes. A batch of cake could take ten workers more than ten hours: three hours to make the cake and seven hours to steam it. The company often ran out of stock during periods of high demand, such as the Spring Festival. In 1990, it introduced machinery to increase production capacity.

The cakes would originally remain fresh for only a few days after production, limiting their distribution range. Company researchers extended the cake's shelf life to three months during the 1990s, allowing it to be sold more widely.

The manufacturer now has a 2,680-square-metre (28,800 sq ft) factory, a fryer, five grinding machines, three blenders, four food steamers, a boiler, cooling equipment and a packing machine. After an investment of over ¥100,000, it produces more than 35 tons of niujingao each year.

== Flavors ==
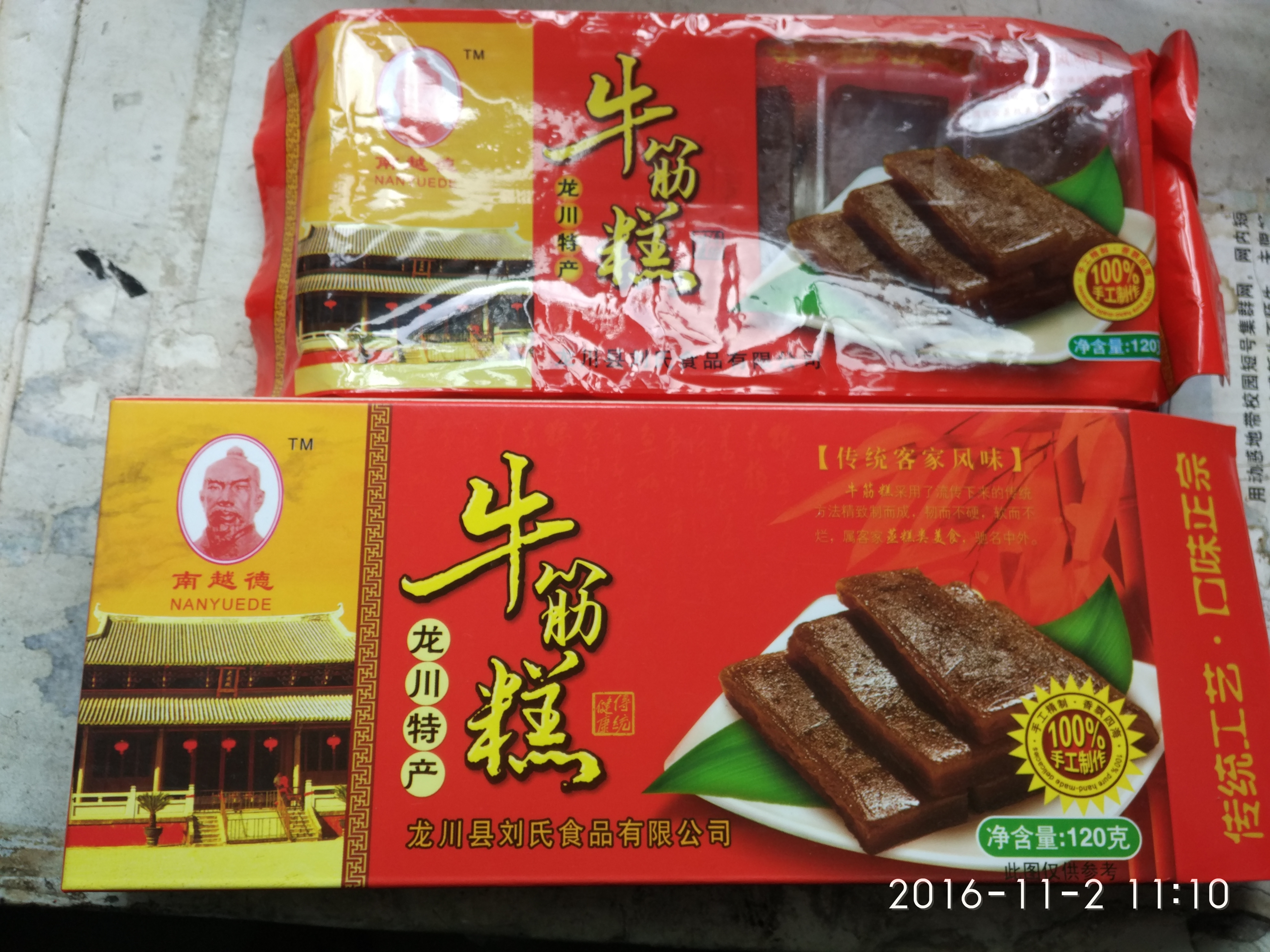
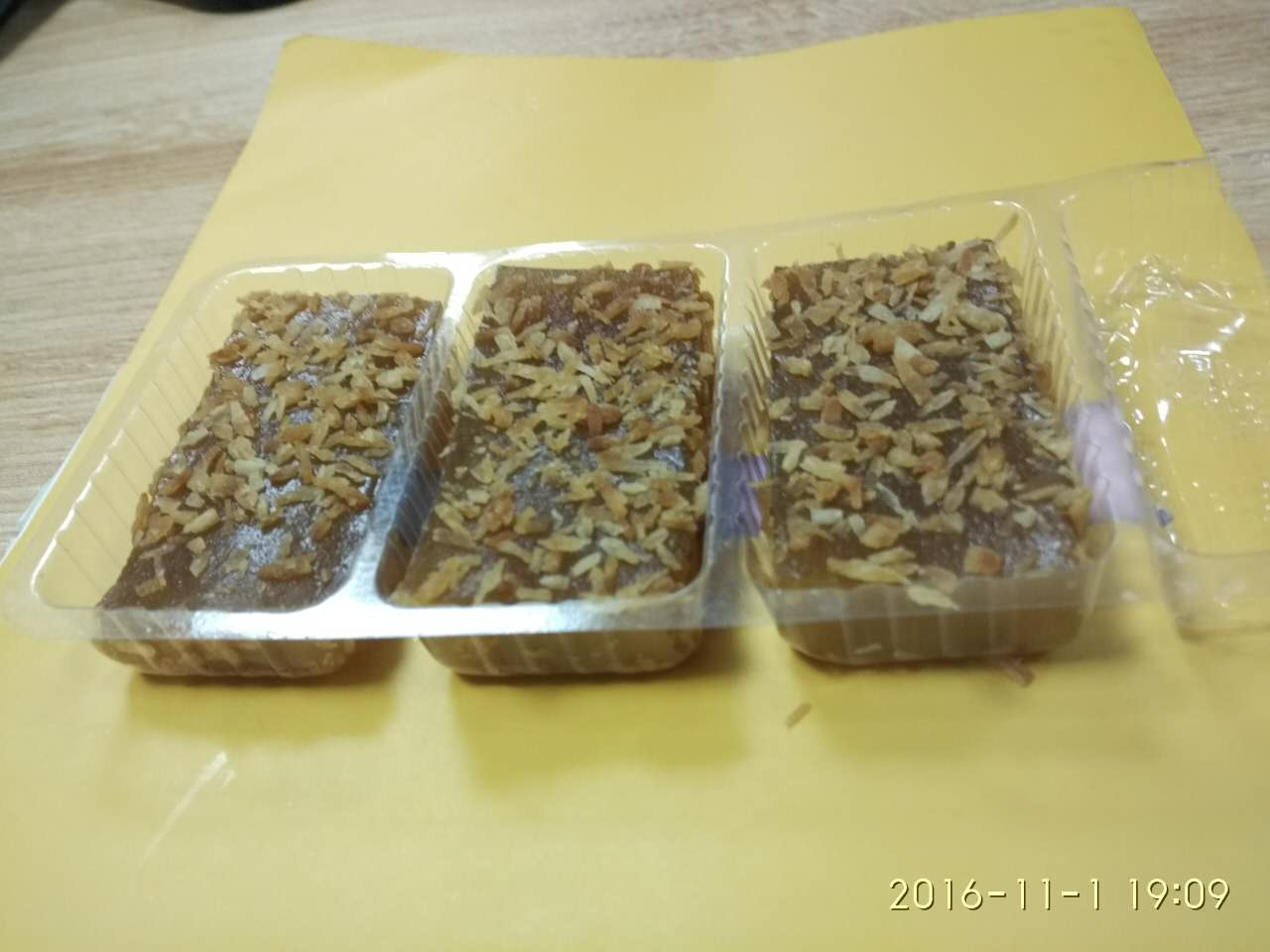
Niujingao in original (left) and coconut flavors

Original-flavor niujingao follow the traditional recipe and are made from glutinous rice flour, maltose syrup, dried orange peel, peanut oil and glucose syrup. Coconut-flavored cakes, made from glutinous rice flour, maltose syrup, peanut oil, white sugar and desiccated coconut, are popular with young people. Ginger candy is a popular snack among the Hakka people, and ginger-flavored cakes are made from glutinous rice flour, maltose syrup, peanut oil, white sugar and ginger.
