= Luofu, Meizhou =

Town in Xingning, Guangdong, China

Coordinates: 24.5220°N 115.5826°E

- Simplified Chinese: 罗浮镇
Transcriptions
Standard Mandarin
- Hanyu Pinyin: Luófú Zhèn

Luofu is a town under the jurisdiction of Xingning City, Meizhou, in eastern Guangdong Province, China.
