= Longtian, Xingning =

Town in Meizhou, China

Coordinates: 24.2146°N 115.7120°E

- Simplified Chinese: 龙田镇
Transcriptions
Standard Mandarin
- Hanyu Pinyin: Lóngtián Zhèn

Longtian is a town under the jurisdiction of Xingning City, Meizhou, in eastern Guangdong Province, China.
