= Xingning Basin =

Xingning Basin, located in Xingning, China, is the largest basin in east Guangdong province. It spans 302 km^{2}. Ostracode fossils from at least a dozen species in ten genera have been found there, from both the Early and Late Cretaceous.
