= Ningxin Subdistrict, Meizhou =

Subdistrict of Guangdong Province, China

Coordinates: 24.1379°N 115.7584°E

- Simplified Chinese: 宁新街道
Transcriptions
Standard Mandarin
- Hanyu Pinyin: Níngxīn Jiēdào

Ningxin is a subdistrict of Xingning City, Meizhou, in eastern Guangdong Province, China.
