= Daping, Meizhou =

Town in China

Coordinates: 24.3298°N 115.5853°E

- Simplified Chinese: 大坪镇
Transcriptions
Standard Mandarin
- Hanyu Pinyin: Dàpíng Zhèn

Daping is a town under the jurisdiction of Xingning City, Meizhou, in eastern Guangdong Province, China.
