= Fuxing Subdistrict, Meizhou =

Subdistrict of Guangdong Province, China

Coordinates: 24.1267°N 115.7227°E

- Simplified Chinese: 福兴街道
Transcriptions
Standard Mandarin
- Hanyu Pinyin: Fúxìng Jiēdào

Fuxing is a subdistrict of Xingning City, Meizhou, in eastern Guangdong Province, China.
