= Yetang, Meizhou =

Chinese town

Coordinates: 24.1927°N 115.6654°E

- Simplified Chinese: 叶塘镇
Transcriptions
Standard Mandarin
- Hanyu Pinyin: Yètáng zhèn

Yetang is a town under the jurisdiction of Xingning City, Meizhou, in eastern Guangdong Province, China.
