= Tengzhou =

Tengzhou 滕州市
- County-level city
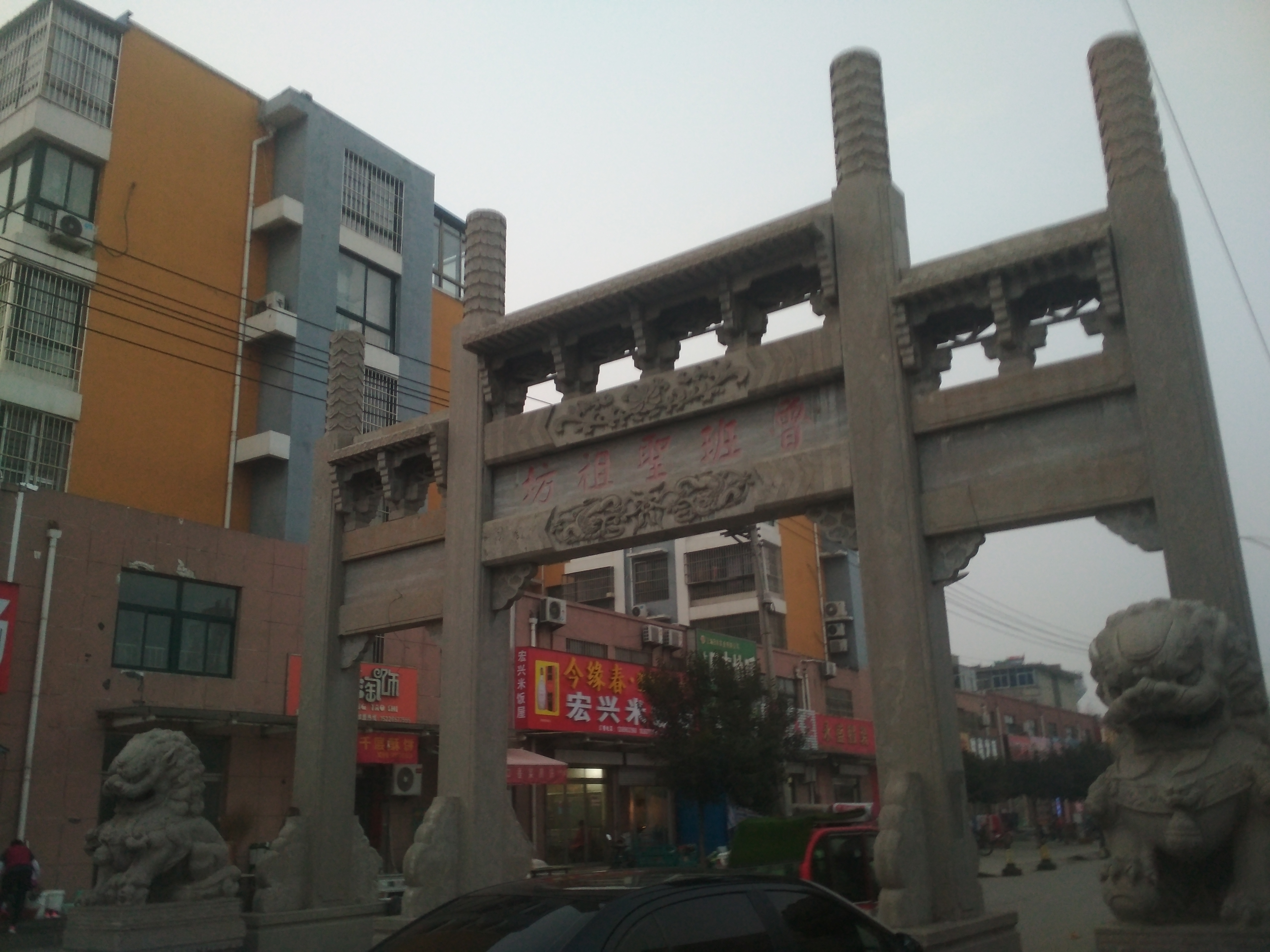

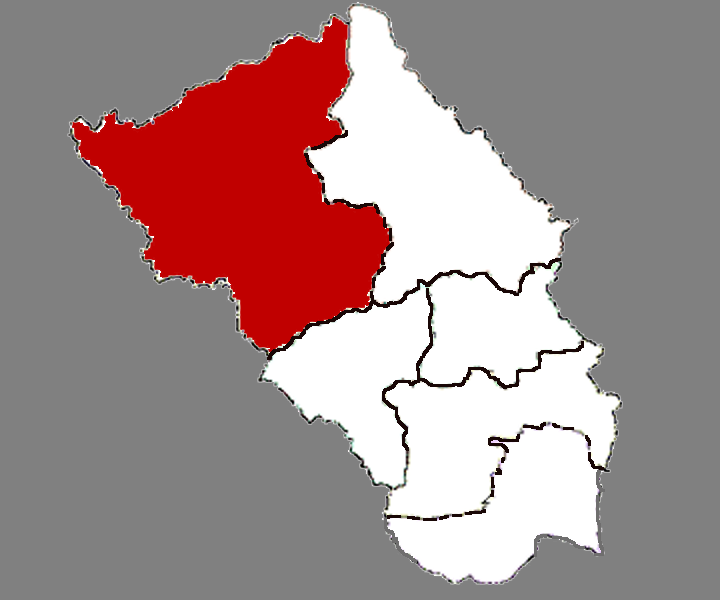
- Location in Zaozhuang

- Location in Shandong
- Coordinates: 35°05′N 117°09′E
- Country: People's Republic of China
- Province: Shandong
- Prefecture-level city: Zaozhuang
- Township-level divisions: 21

Government
  - CPC Committee Secretary: Shao Shiguan (邵士官)
  - Mayor: Liu Wenqiang (刘文强)

Area
  - Total: 1,485 km^{2} (573 sq mi)

Population (2019)
  - Total: 1,756,300
  - Density: 1,183/km^{2} (3,063/sq mi)
- Time zone: UTC+8 (China Standard)
- Postal code: 277500
- Area code: 0632
- Website: tengzhou.gov.cn

Tengzhou
- Chinese: 滕州
- Postal: Tengchow
Transcriptions
Standard Mandarin
- Hanyu Pinyin: Téngzhōu
- Wade–Giles: T'eng^{2}-chou^{1}

Tengzhou (Chinese: 滕州; pinyin: Téngzhōu) is a county-level city of Zaozhuang, Shandong province of the People's Republic of China. It is the site of the feudal vassal State of Teng during the Spring and Autumn period.

Tengzhou was likely the birthplace of the philosopher Mozi, and the city hosts the Mozi Memorial Hall (simplified Chinese: 墨子纪念馆; traditional Chinese: 墨子紀念館) to commemorate him.

The mayor of Tengzhou is Liu Wenqiang, and the Tengzhou Party Committee Secretary is Shao Shiguan.

Tengzhou has an area of 1,485 square kilometres (573 mi^{2}), and a population of 1,756,300 as of 2019. As of the end of 2022, the resident population of Tengzhou was 1,553,200.

== History ==
The settlement of Tengzhou is said to date back to the Yellow Emperor.

After the collapse of the Shang dynasty, present-day Tengzhou became the center of the independent Teng state. Eventually, it was conquered by the Qin state.

Upon the reunification of the region, the region became incorporated as Teng County (simplified Chinese: 滕县; traditional Chinese: 滕縣). It remained as Teng County until the Jin Dynasty, when it became the Tengyang Prefecture (simplified Chinese: 滕阳州; traditional Chinese: 滕陽州). The prefecture was abolished at the start of the Ming Dynasty.

From 1945 to 1953, the county changed administration numerous times, before finally becoming Teng County.

On March 7, 1988, Teng County became the county-level city of Tengzhou.

== Geography ==
Tengzhou is Located on the Huanghuai Plain, it borders the Taiyi Mountain to the east and Weishan Lake to the west, and has a minimum elevation of 33.5 metres (110 ft), and a maximum elevation of 596.6 metres (1,957 ft).

=== Climate ===
Tengzhou is located in the southern edge of the warm temperate zone, the average temperature of the coldest month is -0.2 °C. Tengzhou experiences an average annual temperature of 13.6 °C (56.5 °F), and an average precipitation of 773.1 millimetres (30.44 in). There are four distinct seasons with abundant rainfall and plenty of light.

Climate data for Tengzhou, elevation 75 m (246 ft), (1991–2020 normals, extremes 1981–2010)
Month	Jan	Feb	Mar	Apr	May	Jun	Jul	Aug	Sep	Oct	Nov	Dec	Year
Record high °C (°F)	15.9 (60.6)	23.5 (74.3)	27.6 (81.7)	32.6 (90.7)	36.3 (97.3)	38.7 (101.7)	40.6 (105.1)	36.9 (98.4)	35.6 (96.1)	34.8 (94.6)	25.3 (77.5)	19.8 (67.6)	40.6 (105.1)
Mean daily maximum °C (°F)	5.4 (41.7)	8.9 (48.0)	14.8 (58.6)	21.3 (70.3)	26.8 (80.2)	31.1 (88.0)	31.8 (89.2)	30.8 (87.4)	27.4 (81.3)	21.8 (71.2)	13.9 (57.0)	7.2 (45.0)	20.1 (68.2)
Daily mean °C (°F)	0.2 (32.4)	3.5 (38.3)	9.2 (48.6)	15.7 (60.3)	21.2 (70.2)	25.7 (78.3)	27.5 (81.5)	26.4 (79.5)	22.1 (71.8)	15.9 (60.6)	8.5 (47.3)	2.0 (35.6)	14.8 (58.7)
Mean daily minimum °C (°F)	−3.8 (25.2)	−1.0 (30.2)	4.2 (39.6)	10.2 (50.4)	15.7 (60.3)	20.8 (69.4)	23.8 (74.8)	22.7 (72.9)	17.7 (63.9)	11.1 (52.0)	4.1 (39.4)	−2.0 (28.4)	10.3 (50.5)
Record low °C (°F)	−17.1 (1.2)	−15.4 (4.3)	−9.8 (14.4)	−3.0 (26.6)	3.3 (37.9)	11.2 (52.2)	16.6 (61.9)	12.8 (55.0)	6.2 (43.2)	−2.3 (27.9)	−10.5 (13.1)	−16.1 (3.0)	−17.1 (1.2)
Average precipitation mm (inches)	10.6 (0.42)	17.1 (0.67)	18.5 (0.73)	37.3 (1.47)	59.5 (2.34)	83.3 (3.28)	191.7 (7.55)	200.6 (7.90)	64.8 (2.55)	28.5 (1.12)	30.3 (1.19)	12.1 (0.48)	754.3 (29.7)
Average precipitation days (≥ 0.1 mm)	3.5	4.3	4.5	5.8	6.9	7.5	11.7	11.7	7.3	5.5	5.1	3.7	77.5
Average snowy days	3.0	2.5	0.7	0.1	0	0	0	0	0	0	0.6	1.6	8.5
Average relative humidity (%)	63	59	56	59	63	64	78	81	74	69	69	66	67
Mean monthly sunshine hours	141.3	149.6	202.5	222.2	238.6	207.6	185.1	188.3	181.5	182.8	149.9	142.3	2,191.7
Percentage possible sunshine	45	48	54	56	55	48	42	46	49	53	49	47	49
Source: China Meteorological Administration

== Administrative divisions ==
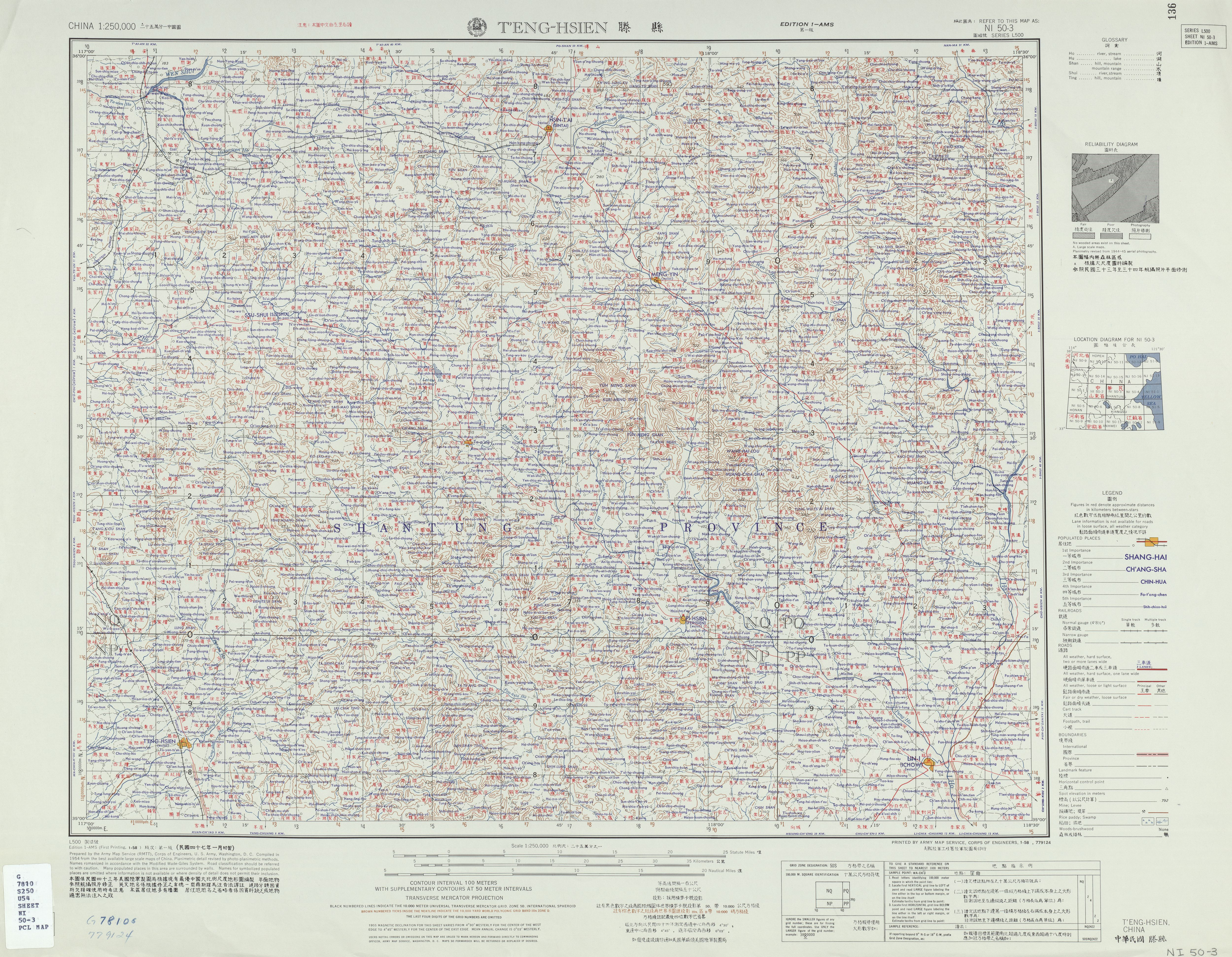
Map including Tengzhou (labeled as 滕縣 T'eng-Hsien (walled)) (AMS, 1954)

The county-level city of Tengzhou administers 21 township-level divisions: 5 subdistricts and 16 towns. These township-level divisions then administer 1,226 village-level divisions.

=== Subdistricts ===
The city's 5 subdistricts are Jinghe Subdistrict, Longquan Subdistrict, Beixin Subdistrict, Shannan Subdistrict, and Dongshahe Subdistrict.

=== Towns ===
The city's 16 towns are Hongxu, Nanshahe, Dawu, Binhu, Jisuo, Xigang, Jiangtun, Baogou, Zhangwang, Guanqiao, Chaihudian, Yangzhuang, Mushi, Jiahe, Longyang, and Dongguo.

== Demographics ==
As of 2019, Tengzhou is home to 1,756,300 people, living in 518,500 households. As of the end of 2022, the resident population of Tengzhou was 1,553,200. The city has about 927,900 males and 828,400 females. The city has a birth rate is 10.65 per thousand, a death rate of 6.15 per thousand, and a rate of natural increase of 4.49 per thousand.

In addition to the city's Han Chinese population, 30 ethnic minorities live in Tengzhou, the largest of which is the Hui people. As of 2009, the city's ethnic minority population totaled 4,050, with the Hui people comprising 2,280 of this population.

== Economy ==
=== Agriculture ===
In 2019, 788,100 tons of agricultural produce was made, a 2.1% increase from 2018. 56,200 hectares of vegetables were harvested, representing a 0.7% increase from 2018. The city's pigs were afflicted by African swine fever, resulting in a 27.4% drop in live pigs from 2018 to 2019. The city slaughtered 27.08 million heads of poultry in 2019, a 5.7% increase from the previous year. Tengzhou's aquaculture output totaled 41.2 thousand tons in 2019, a decline of 8.9% from the previous year.

=== Industry ===
As of 2019, Tengzhou had 254 industrial enterprises above designated size. The value added of industrial enterprises above designated size increased by 3.2% from 2019, with light industry increasing 1.3%, and heavy industry increasing 3.8%. Major industries in Tengzhou include chemicals, minerals, petroleum, coal, food processing, Chinese medicine, electronic components, and cement.

In the early 2010s, Tengzhou, which had been a major manufacturing area, was experiencing an economic downturn which closed many local factories. However, The Wall Street Journal reported in July 2015 that innovation, particularly in manufacturing, had revitalized the local economy.

=== Retail ===
In 2019, the city's total retail sales of consumer goods increased by 4.9%, with urban retail sales increasing 3.6%, and rural retail sales increasing by 9.9%. In 2019, Tengzhou's auto sector grew by 10.7%; its books, newspapers, and magazines retail sales increased by 16.5%; Tengzhou's sports and entertainment goods retail sales increased by 27.7%.

=== Foreign investment and trade ===
In 2019, Tengzhou received $45.59 million of foreign investment, which was utilized for 19 different projects. In 2019, ¥328 million worth of goods was imported into Tengzhou, and ¥3.445 billion worth of goods was exported from Tengzhou.

== Main tourist attractions ==
Mozi Memorial Museum – set academic seminars, library collection, science and technology education, visits in one of the comprehensive courtyard building groups. The east courtyard is the Mozi Memorial Hall, which mainly exhibits Mozi's biography, scientific and technological military achievements, results, Mozi statues, etc. The west courtyard is the office area of Tengzhou Mozi Research Center of Shandong University. The west courtyard is the office area of Mozi Research Center of Tengzhou City, Shandong University, which is equipped with a gallery of celebrities' inscriptions and a collection of domestic and foreign Mozi research books and materials.

Lu Ban Memorial Hall – there are the Hall of Sacred Ancestors, the Hall of Public Ceremonies, the Hall of Woodworking Instruments, the Hall of Stone Weapons, the Hall of Weapons, the Hall of Architecture, the Hall of Boats and Bridges, the Hall of Science and Technology Education for Youths, and the Hall of Achievements of Luban's Successors.

Weishan Lake Wetland Red Lotus Scenic Area – There are more than 50 attractions in the scenic area, such as Panlong Island, Xiaolizhuang, Aquatic Plant Garden, Wetland Rafting Garden, Lotus Boutique Garden, Wetland Museum and so on. Weishan Lake Wetland Red Lotus Tourist Scenic Area is the largest and most primitive preservation state in East China, with the best wetland landscape and the largest lotus ornamental place in China.It is known as the "Lotus Capital of China".

Wang Xuezhong Art Gallery – Inside the hall, there are Strider Garden, Strider Academy, Poetry Monument Gallery, Double Pond Lotus Cui, Stone Bridge Maple Forest, and Academy Corridor. There are exhibition halls, cultural relics exhibition rooms, ancient painting and calligraphy exhibition rooms, lecture halls, data rooms, and reception rooms. It is a collection, exhibition, research, and exchange in one of the cultural and boogey units, the main collection of Mr. Wang Xuezhong's calligraphy, Chinese painting, oil painting, watercolor paintings created over the years.

Longshan Scenic Area – with Longshan Mountain as the main body, it belongs to Taiyishan Mountain Range together with Taishan Mountain and Yishan Mountain.In the north, it is connected with Tai Mountain and Yishan Mountain, and in the east and west, it is adjacent to the scenic spots of Weishan Lake Red Lotus Wetland and Lianqing Mountain."Longling Clear Clouds" is listed as the top of the eight scenic spots in Guteng.

Tengguo Old Town – It was the political, economic and cultural center of Tengguo at that time. In the scenic spot, there are mainly Wengong Ancient Platform, Teng Wengong Building, Ancient City Wall, Li Bai Spectacular Stone Carving, Lv Zu Pavilion and other historical landscapes. Tengguo Old Town is a famous tourist attraction in Zaozhuang, and Wengong Ancient Platform is one of the "Eight Scenic Spots of Ancient Teng" and one of the top ten scenic spots in Zaozhuang.

== Transport ==
=== Road ===
National Highway 104 runs through the city, as does the Beijing–Fujian Expressway (Chinese: 京福高速公路).

=== Rail ===
The Beijing–Shanghai railway, the Beijing–Shanghai high-speed railway both run through the city.

=== Maritime ===
The city's two ports, Xin'an Port (Chinese: 辛安港) and Tengzhou Port (Chinese: 滕州港) are connected to the Beijing–Hangzhou Grand Canal.

== Food ==
Tengzhou's special food is spicy chicken, mutton soup, pancakes, vegetable pancakes, spicy soup, Zhang Wang dried salted duck, Wang Kai pork head, and so on.

== Famous people ==
=== Ancient times ===
- Teng Wengong
- Mo Zi
- Lu Ban
- Xi Zhong
- Shusun Tong
- Gongsun Hong

=== Modern times ===
- Liu Ziheng
- Wang Xuezhong
- Yang Guangli
- Liu Shutian
