= Xintian =

Xintian may refer to the following places in China:

- Xintian County, county in Hunan
- Xintian, Anhui (新田), town in Xuancheng, Anhui
- Xintian, Pengshui County (新田), town in Pengshui Miao and Tujia Autonomous County, Chongqing
- Xintian, Wanzhou District (新田), town in Wanzhou District, Chongqing
- Xintian, Lintao County (新添), town in Lintao County, Gansu
- Xintian, Minle County (新天), town in Minle County, Gansu
- Xintian, Longchuan County (新田), town in Longchuan County, Guangdong
- Xintian, Luhe County (新田), town in Luhe County, Guangdong
- Xintian, Guangxi (新田), town in Bobai County, Guangxi
- Xintian Township, Hunan (新田乡), township in Xupu County, Hunan
- Xintian, Xinfeng County (新田), town in Xinfeng County, Jiangxi
- Xintian, Yichun (新田), town in Yichun, Jiangxi
- Xintian Township, Shanxi (新田乡), township in Houma, Shanxi
- Xintian Township, Sichuan (新田乡), township in Huidong County, Sichuan
