= Jingnan, Guangdong =

Town in Xingning, Guangdong, China

Coordinates: 24.1883°N 115.9244°E

- Simplified Chinese: 径南镇
Transcriptions
Standard Mandarin
- Hanyu Pinyin: Jìngnán Zhèn

Jingnan is a town under the jurisdiction of Xingning City, Meizhou, in eastern Guangdong Province, China.
