= Diaofang =

Town in Xingning, Guangdong, China

Coordinates: 24.0928°N 115.7568°E

- Simplified Chinese: 刁坊镇
Transcriptions
Standard Mandarin
- Hanyu Pinyin: Diāofang Zhèn

Diaofeng is a town under the jurisdiction of Xingning City, Meizhou, in eastern Guangdong Province, China.
