= Huangbei, Meizhou =

Town in Xingning, Guangdong, China

Coordinates: 24.4121°N 115.7457°E

- Simplified Chinese: 黄陂镇
Transcriptions
Standard Mandarin
- Hanyu Pinyin: Huángbēi Zhèn

Huangbei is a town under the jurisdiction of Xingning City, Meizhou, in eastern Guangdong Province, China.
