= Huilong, Heyuan =

Huilong 回龙镇
- Town
- Location in Guangdong
- Coordinates: 24°22′19″N 115°31′33″E
- Country: People's Republic of China
- Province: Guangdong
- Prefecture-level city: Heyuan
- County: Longchuan
- Village-level divisions: 1 residential community 14 villages

Area
  - Total: 84.5 km^{2} (32.6 sq mi)
- Elevation: 212 m (696 ft)

Population
  - Total: 29,000
  - Density: 340/km^{2} (890/sq mi)
- Time zone: UTC+8 (China Standard)
- Area code: 0762

Huilong (simplified Chinese: 回龙; traditional Chinese: 回龍; pinyin: Huílóng) is a town of central Longchuan County in northeastern Guangdong province, China, situated 40 kilometres (25 mi) northeast of the county seat. As of 2011, it has one residential community (社区) and 14 villages under its administration.

== See also ==
- List of township-level divisions of Guangdong
