= Huanghuai =

Town in Xingning, Guangdong, China

Coordinates: 24.4672°N 115.7773°E

- Simplified Chinese: 黄槐镇
Transcriptions
Standard Mandarin
- Hanyu Pinyin: Huánghuái Zhèn

Huanghuai is a town under the jurisdiction of Xingning City, Meizhou, in eastern Guangdong Province, China.
