= Shuikou, Meizhou =

Town in Guangdong Province, China

Coordinates: 23.9829°N 115.8967°E

- Simplified Chinese: 水口镇
Transcriptions
Standard Mandarin
- Hanyu Pinyin: Shuǐkǒu Zhèn

Shuikou is a town under the jurisdiction of Xingning City, Meizhou, in eastern Guangdong Province, China.
