= Xingning Academy =

Coordinates: 24.13406°N 115.73167°E

- Traditional Chinese: 興寧學宮
- Simplified Chinese: 兴宁学宫
Transcriptions
Standard Mandarin
- Hanyu Pinyin: Xīngníng Xuégōng

The Xingning Academy is an ancient structure in Xingning, China. Now part of Xingmin High School (兴民中学), it was originally built during the Ming Dynasty (1368–1644).
