= Xingtian Subdistrict =

Subdistrict of Guangdong Province, China

Coordinates: 24.1305°N 115.7302°E

- Simplified Chinese: 兴田街道
Transcriptions
Standard Mandarin
- Hanyu Pinyin: Xìngtián Jiēdào

Xingtian is a subdistrict of Xingning City, Meizhou, in eastern Guangdong Province, China.
