= Xingning, Guangdong =

Xingning 兴宁市 Hinnên
- County-level city
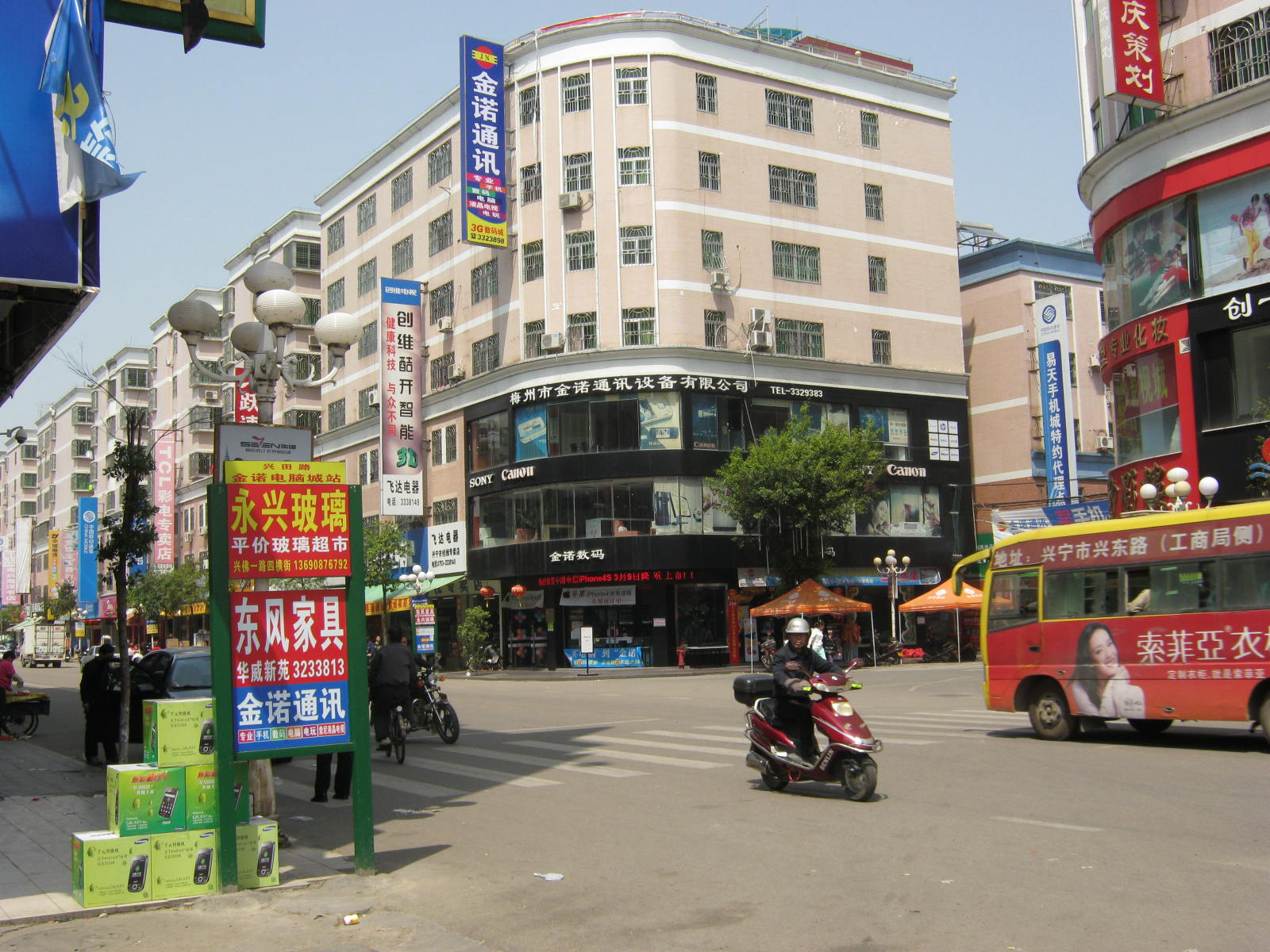
- Xingtianyi Road (兴田一路), Xingning

- Location in Guangdong
- Coordinates: 24°8′5″N 115°43′48″E
- Country: People's Republic of China
- Province: Guangdong
- Prefecture-level city: Meizhou

Area
  - Total: 2,104.85 km^{2} (812.69 sq mi)

Population (2020 census)
  - Total: 779,411
  - Density: 370.293/km^{2} (959.054/sq mi)
- Time zone: UTC+8 (China Standard)
- Postal code: 514500
- Area code: 0753
- Website: http://www.xingning.gov.cn/

Xingning is also the era name for Emperor Ai of the Jin dynasty.

Xingning (postal: Hingning; simplified Chinese: 兴宁; traditional Chinese: 興寧; pinyin: Xīngníng, Hakka: Hinnên) is a county-level city, under the jurisdiction of Meizhou City, Guangdong Province, China. The second largest city in eastern Guangdong, Xingning has an area of 2,104.85 square kilometres (812.69 sq mi) and a population of 779,411 (2020).

== Names ==
Xingning was formerly known as Qichang (齐昌; 齊昌).

== History ==
Xingning county was established in 331 CE, later becoming the capital of the 10th-century Southern Han Dynasty.

From its previous long-established status a county, in 1991 Xingning was upgraded to a county-level city within the municipal jurisdiction of Meizhou.

== Location ==
Xingning is located in the north eastern part of Guangdong province and borders the counties of Pingyuan, Meixian, Fengshun and Wuhua in Meizhou City, Longchuan in Heyuan City and Xunwu in Ganzhou City, Jiangxi Province.

== Ethno-linguistic make-up ==
Xingning is noted for its large Hakka population.

== Administrative districts ==
The city governs three subdistricts and 17 towns:

=== Subdistricts ===
- Fuxing
- Ningxin
- Xingtian

=== Towns ===
- Daping
- Diaofeng
- Luofu
- Luogang
- Heshui
- Huangbei
- Huanghuai
- Jingnan
- Longtian
- Nibei
- Ningzhong
- Shima
- Shuikou
- Xinbei
- Xinwei
- Yetang
- Yonghe

== Climate ==
Climate data for Xingning, elevation 124 m (407 ft), (1991–2020 normals, extremes 1981–present)
Month	Jan	Feb	Mar	Apr	May	Jun	Jul	Aug	Sep	Oct	Nov	Dec	Year
Record high °C (°F)	28.9 (84.0)	31.9 (89.4)	34.2 (93.6)	35.9 (96.6)	36.1 (97.0)	38.3 (100.9)	38.5 (101.3)	39.0 (102.2)	37.4 (99.3)	37.8 (100.0)	34.2 (93.6)	29.3 (84.7)	39.0 (102.2)
Mean daily maximum °C (°F)	17.9 (64.2)	19.7 (67.5)	22.4 (72.3)	26.5 (79.7)	29.7 (85.5)	32.0 (89.6)	33.9 (93.0)	33.5 (92.3)	31.9 (89.4)	29.0 (84.2)	24.9 (76.8)	19.7 (67.5)	26.8 (80.2)
Daily mean °C (°F)	12.1 (53.8)	14.3 (57.7)	17.4 (63.3)	21.8 (71.2)	25.1 (77.2)	27.3 (81.1)	28.7 (83.7)	28.2 (82.8)	26.7 (80.1)	23.2 (73.8)	18.7 (65.7)	13.5 (56.3)	21.4 (70.6)
Mean daily minimum °C (°F)	8.2 (46.8)	10.5 (50.9)	13.9 (57.0)	18.3 (64.9)	21.7 (71.1)	24.1 (75.4)	24.9 (76.8)	24.8 (76.6)	23.1 (73.6)	19.0 (66.2)	14.3 (57.7)	9.3 (48.7)	17.7 (63.8)
Record low °C (°F)	−2.5 (27.5)	0.2 (32.4)	1.2 (34.2)	7.5 (45.5)	12.1 (53.8)	16.9 (62.4)	19.2 (66.6)	21.3 (70.3)	15.4 (59.7)	7.7 (45.9)	1.9 (35.4)	−3.5 (25.7)	−3.5 (25.7)
Average precipitation mm (inches)	52.0 (2.05)	70.7 (2.78)	132.0 (5.20)	175.4 (6.91)	228.2 (8.98)	244.9 (9.64)	161.6 (6.36)	187.2 (7.37)	111.4 (4.39)	40.2 (1.58)	37.1 (1.46)	43.5 (1.71)	1,484.2 (58.43)
Average precipitation days (≥ 0.1 mm)	7.5	10.4	14.7	15.5	18.5	18.3	15.5	17.2	11.3	5.0	5.7	6.2	145.8
Average snowy days	0.1	0	0	0	0	0	0	0	0	0	0	0	0.1
Average relative humidity (%)	74	76	79	78	80	81	77	79	77	72	72	72	76
Mean monthly sunshine hours	134.4	107.0	101.4	115.8	139.2	157.7	222.2	207.6	197.6	202.6	172.3	158.3	1,916.1
Percentage possible sunshine	40	33	27	30	34	39	54	52	54	57	53	48	43
Source: China Meteorological Administrationall-time May lowall-time October record

== Transport ==
- Guangzhou–Meizhou–Shantou railway
- Longyan–Longchuan high-speed railway

== Culture ==
The majority of Xingning's residents are Hakka people.

== Tourist attractions ==
- Shenguang Hill
- Xingning Academy
- Heshui Reservoir

== See also ==
- List of township-level divisions of Guangdong
