= Yujiao Town =

Town in Jieyang, China

Coordinates: 23°36′14″N 116°30′19″E

Yujiao Town (simplified Chinese: 玉滘镇; traditional Chinese: 玉滘鎮; pinyin: Yùjiào Zhèn) is located in south east China. It is a township-level administrative unit under the jurisdiction of Jiedong District, Jieyang City, Guangdong Province.

Yujiao Town has a population of 50,614 (according to the census in 2020) and a total area of 36.44 km², with the population density of 1,389/km².

== Administrative division ==
Yujiao Town has jurisdiction over the following sub-areas:

- Yujiao Community (simplified Chinese: 玉滘社区; traditional Chinese: 玉滘社區),
- Xinzhai Village (新寨村),
- Raomei Village (饶美村; 饒美村),
- Qiaotou Village (桥头村; 橋頭村),
- Dongmian Village (东面村; 東面村),
- Banyang Village (半洋村),
- Fengmei Village (凤美村; 鳳美村),
- Dajiao Village (大窖村),
- Xiekeng Village (谢坑村; 謝坑村),
- Jianshan Village (尖山村),
- Chidu Village (池渡村).

== Airport ==
The Jieyang Chaoshan International Airport, the largest airport in Eastern Guangdong Province, is located near Yujiao, and this is a good support to the development of the town in various fields.

== See also ==
- Jiedong, Jieyang
- Jieyang
- Denggang Town
