= Xing Ruiming =

Chinese educator (1888–1990)

Xing Ruiming, or Ruiming Xing (simplified Chinese: 邢瑞鸣; traditional Chinese: 邢瑞鳴; pinyin: Xíng Ruìmíng; 1888–1990), was a Chinese educator, Christian evangelist, and advocate of education for young women in Jieyang, Guangdong province, China. She served as principal of the first girls' school in Jieyang county (now Jieyang city), after having been a student in the first girls' literacy class in the region.

== Early life and education ==
Ruiming was born on April 26, 1888, into a peasant family in Fengwei village, in the eastern suburbs of Rongcheng, the county seat of Jieyang, Guangdong province. Later, her father converted the whole family to Christianity, sparing Ruiming from foot binding, which was popular at that time.

In 1899, Xing Ruiming was one of 12 girls from Christian families admitted into a literacy class (識字班) in Rongcheng. According to the Rongcheng Town Chronicles, the girls' literacy class founded by the wife of American Christian pastor Jacob Speicher was the first school for girls in Jieyang. Speicher hired Chen Meixian from Chenghai County to teach the class. Xing received instruction for two years, after which the classes were discontinued.

She resumed her studies at the age of 15, when she went to Shantou to study at Zhengguang Girls' School (正光女校), which was run by the Christian Queshi Church. She was elected president of the Christian students' union.

== Career ==
After graduating in 1908, Xing Ruiming returned to Rongcheng, where Chen Meixian had started another church-sponsored literacy class for girls. Xing was hired as the school's administrator, and decided to call it "Zongguang Girls' School" (宗光女校), stylised after her own alma mater, making it the first girls' school in Jieyang to have a regular name.

In 1913, the second year of the Republic of China, Xing Ruiming left Zongguang Girls' School and founded Jingyuan Girls' School (靜遠女校) at Zhuxiang near Jinxian Gate of Rongcheng, and became its principal and teacher. Starting with an enrollment of two dozen or so pupils, in less than four years, it expanded to more than 80, divided into 4 classes. The subjects taught included Chinese, mathematics, history, geography, abacus, singing, and hand embroidery.

The school hired several well-known scholars as teachers. Xing Ruiming’s husband, Chen Dexiu, also assisted in teaching. In the 18th year of the Republic of China (1929), Zongguang Girls' School was renamed the Truth Girls' Middle School (真理女中); Xing Ruiming was appointed as the principal, and students of Jingyuan Girls' School were transferred to Truth Girls' Middle School. Later, the Truth Boys' and Girls' Schools merged to form the Jieyang County Truth Middle School (揭陽縣真理中學). Xing Ruiming resigned as principal but remained a school director.

Xing Ruiming had thousands of students, including Professor Xie Haiyan, president of the Nanjing Academy of Fine Arts.

== Evangelism ==
By 1932, there were several girls' schools in the county town. Xing Ruiming retired from teaching to focus full-time on the spread of Christian gospel. With her church colleagues, she went to rural villages for missionary visits, during which she also taught Chinese characters and Bible reading. For the next three years, she visited various rural churches in Jieyang and Puning counties, focusing her efforts on women's education and evangelism in the Chaoshan region.

From 1935, Xing Ruiming went to work at the church-run Jieyang Truth Hospital (真理醫院) as a chaplain, a position she held for 15 years. In 1944, the Japanese army invaded Jieyang, and the doctors and nurses fled the hospital, leaving Xing Ruiming and a few others behind. At that time, there was a female patient in the hospital who had just undergone surgery. Xing moved the patient to her mother's home in the suburb for recuperation, and sent her home after her condition improved two days later. Xing's relationship with co-workers, doctors, nurses, patients and their relatives led many people to accept Christianity.

As the political environment changed in the People's Republic of China, Xing Ruiming focused more on helping to raise her grandchildren and looking after her elderly mother, but continued to preach the gospel whenever the opportunity arose. During the Cultural Revolution, the churches were closed and Bibles and hymn books were destroyed. However, Xing wrote down many Bible chapters and hymns from memory. Before the reform and opening up of China, Chaoshan region was quite poor, and many people lacked food and clothing. Xing lived frugally, keeping a limited wardrobe, and donating her old clothes after receiving new outfits from her children and grandchildren.

== Personal life and death ==
Xing Ruiming's husband, Chen Dexiu, was also a teacher. They had four children, two daughters and two sons. On November 23, 1990, Xing Ruiming died at home at the age of 102.

== See also ==
- Jieyang
- Queshi Church
- Jieyang Church of Truth
