= Mei Yi =

Mei Yi can refer to:

- Mei Ze (fl. 4th century) or Mei Yi, Jin dynasty official and Confucian scholar
- Mei Yi (translator) (1913–2003), Chinese translator
- Moy Yat (Chinese: 梅逸; pinyin: Méi Yì, 1938–2001), Chinese martial artist
