= Jieyang Church of Truth =

Christian church in Jieyang City, China

- Jieyang Church of Truth
- Address: Linjiang South Road, Rongcheng District, Jieyang, Guangdong
- Country: China
- Denomination: Protestantism
- Website: www.jyzl1865.com

History
- Founded: 1865

Architecture
- Completed: 29 December 1996

Specifications
- Height: 43 metres (141 ft)

Jieyang Church of Truth (simplified Chinese: 揭阳真理堂; traditional Chinese: 揭陽真理堂; pinyin: Jiēyáng Zhēnlǐtáng), full name Jieyang Christian Church of Truth, is the oldest and largest Christian church in Jieyang City, China. In addition to gospel preaching, the church has founded the Jieyang Hospital of Truth, Jieyang School of Truth, nursing homes, etc.

Since December 1996, the Jieyang Associations of China Christian Council and of the Three-Self Patriotic Movement have been located in the Church of Truth, looking after a total of 83 churches with more than 40,000 believers in the city.

== History ==
In 1865, Rev. William Ashmore DD, an American missionary of the Northern Baptist Convention in Shantou Queshi Church, hired Elder Chen Yongquan to preach the gospel in Jieyang. The church activities was held in a rented house on the Cross Street of Chenghuang Temple in the county capital town of Rongcheng. Later, as the number of religious believers gradually increased, a chapel with a capacity of about 200 people was built by the Rong River outside the north gate of Rongcheng in 1889. The following year, the Truth Hospital (the predecessor of the current Jieyang People's Hospital) was founded.

In 1894, American Pastor Jacob Speicher came to Jieyang to work, and the number of believers grew day by day. In 1899, the church built a new church on the east side of the original chapel, named: "Christian Baptist Church of Truth". Then, with the church as the center, evangelistic activities were expanded to villages throughout Jieyang. And "nursing homes" were established to provide care for elderly and helpless believers.

In 1906, the church founded the School of Truth. From the end of the 19th century to the beginning of the 20th century, Baita Church, Deqiao Church, Xinheng Church, Quxi Church, Paotai Church and many others were successively built. In 1925, the Lingdong Baptist Convention (岭东浸信大会) established the "Jieyang District Committee" to look after all Baptist churches in Jieyang County. And the committee office was located in the pastor building of the Church of Truth.

In 1958, due to historical reasons, like many other churches across the country, the Church of Truth stopped worship gathering and the buildings were arranged for use by some factories until the end of the Cultural Revolution.

In 1994, with the efforts of the Municipal Religious Affairs Bureau and other relevant parties, the government returned the church site occupied by the factory to the church. After more than two years of planning, construction and support from churches of Hong Kong and Macao, a new church was built on 29 December 1996 at the original site of the church.

== New church buildings ==
The new Church of Truth has a total construction area of 3,500 square meters, with seven floors in the main building of 43 meters in height. There are a worship hall, a small auditorium, and more than 40 rooms of various sizes. The Jieyang Christian Three-Self Patriotic Association and the Jieyang Christian Association and its book and publication service department are located in this church. At present, Jieyang City has 83 churches with more than 40,000 believers under the leadership of these Associations.

== Public welfare ==
The church pays great attention to social welfare, from the initial medical and drug donation, literacy classes, and girls' schools, to the establishment of the Truth Hospital, the Truth School, nursing homes and other welfare undertakings. And medical caring teams are often sent to serve in rural mountainous areas.

== See also ==
- Queshi Church
- Chaozhou Heng'ai Church
- Dongshan Church (Guangzhou)
- Xing Ruiming
