= Jieyang Tower =

Building in China

- 揭阳楼 (Chinese)
- Location in Guangdong Province
- 23.5677°N 116.3869°E
- Location: Jieyang City, Guangdong Province, China

Site notes
- Website: www.jynews.net/Item/254560_2.aspx

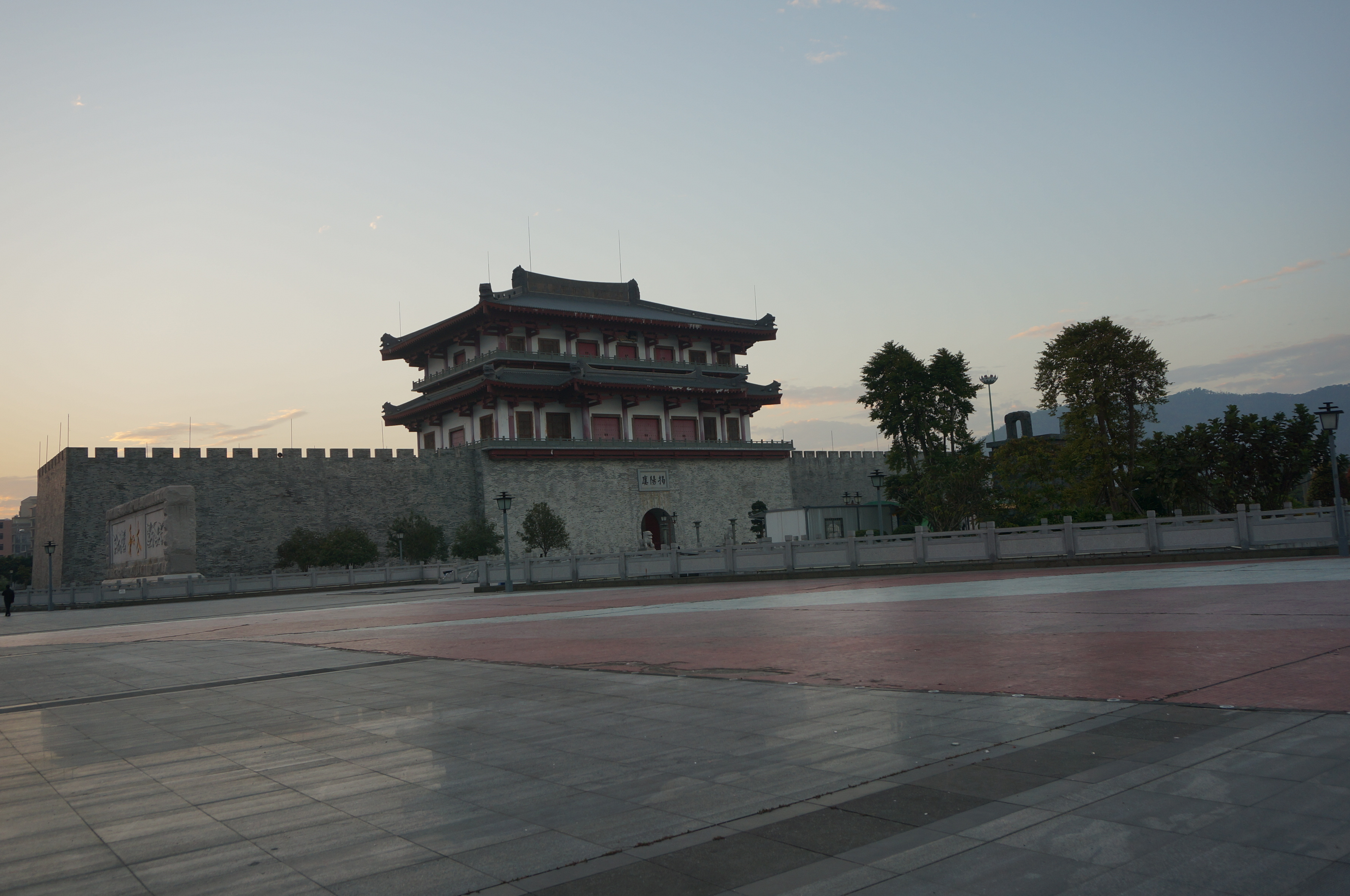
The panorama of Jieyang Tower

Jieyang Tower is a Han-style building located in Jieyang, Guangdong Province, China. It is constructed according to the theme of the lotus on the water and the waterside city of south of the Five Ridges. It was designed to show the history and the urban plan of Jieyang, so it has become a landmark of Jieyang and a tourist attraction.

== Basic information ==
Chinese Name	揭(Jie 1)阳(Yang 2)楼(Lou 2)	English Name	Jieyang Tower
Geographic position	in the junction of Rongcheng District (榕城区) and Jiedong District (揭东区), Jieyang City, Guangdong Province. Near to Rong Jiang River (榕江) and No. 206 national road	Climate	Subtropical monsoon climate
Area	300 thousand square meters	Height	38 meters

== History ==
The ancient Jieyang Tower was built in the Tang dynasty, located in Chaozhou city, Guangdong province. Poets like Han Yu and Mei Yaocheng wrote about it. However, as time went by, the ancient Jieyang Tower became ruins. In 2010, the government rebuilt it in Jieyang city. and an entrepreneur called Huang Changran (黄畅然) donated 15 million RMB to its reestablishment.

== Constituent parts ==
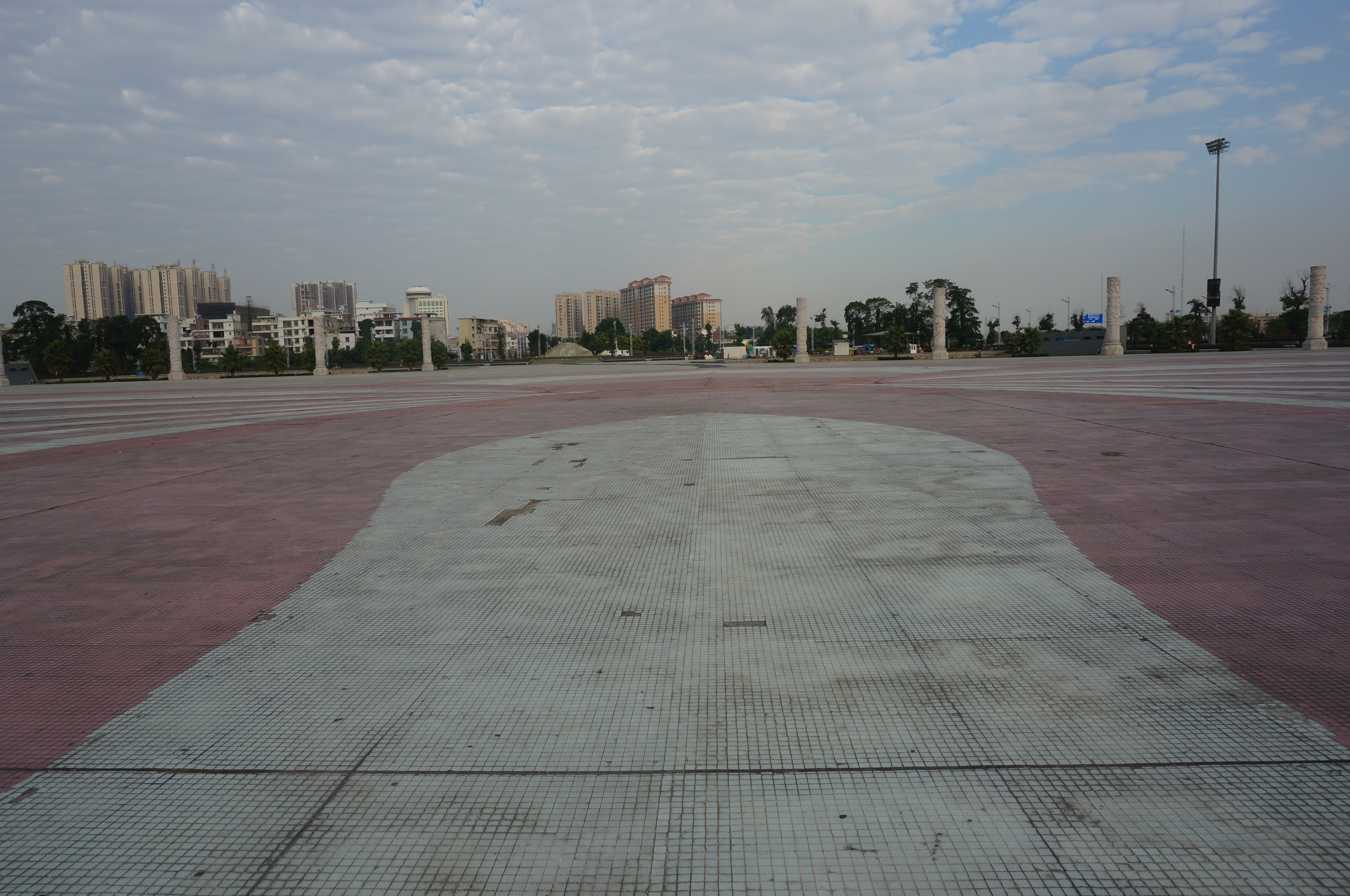
Jieyang Tower Square

=== Jieyang Tower Square ===
Jieyang Tower Square, also named Treasure Tripod Square or Prosperity Square, stands for the whole attraction. There is a liparite in the front of the square that weighs 136 tons and comes from Mount Tai. The square is surrounded by 12 polycarpa trees, nine cultural columns, and eight separate cultural walls. These trees provide shady places for visitors and make a contribution to the environment. All of these columns are 9.8 meters high, with a diameter of 1.6 meters. They are covered with embossment of sun, moon, water, fire and people. The arc-shaped arrangement of these columns implicates the theory that man is an integral part of nature. The cultural walls around the square are covered with embossment of the eight most famous attractions in Jieyang. The embossment on the columns and walls shows famous places, famous legends, or the creation of Jieyang. Also, it reflects the sculpture technique of Jieyang. A large painting of a lotus on the floor of the square embodies the theme of the lotus on the water.

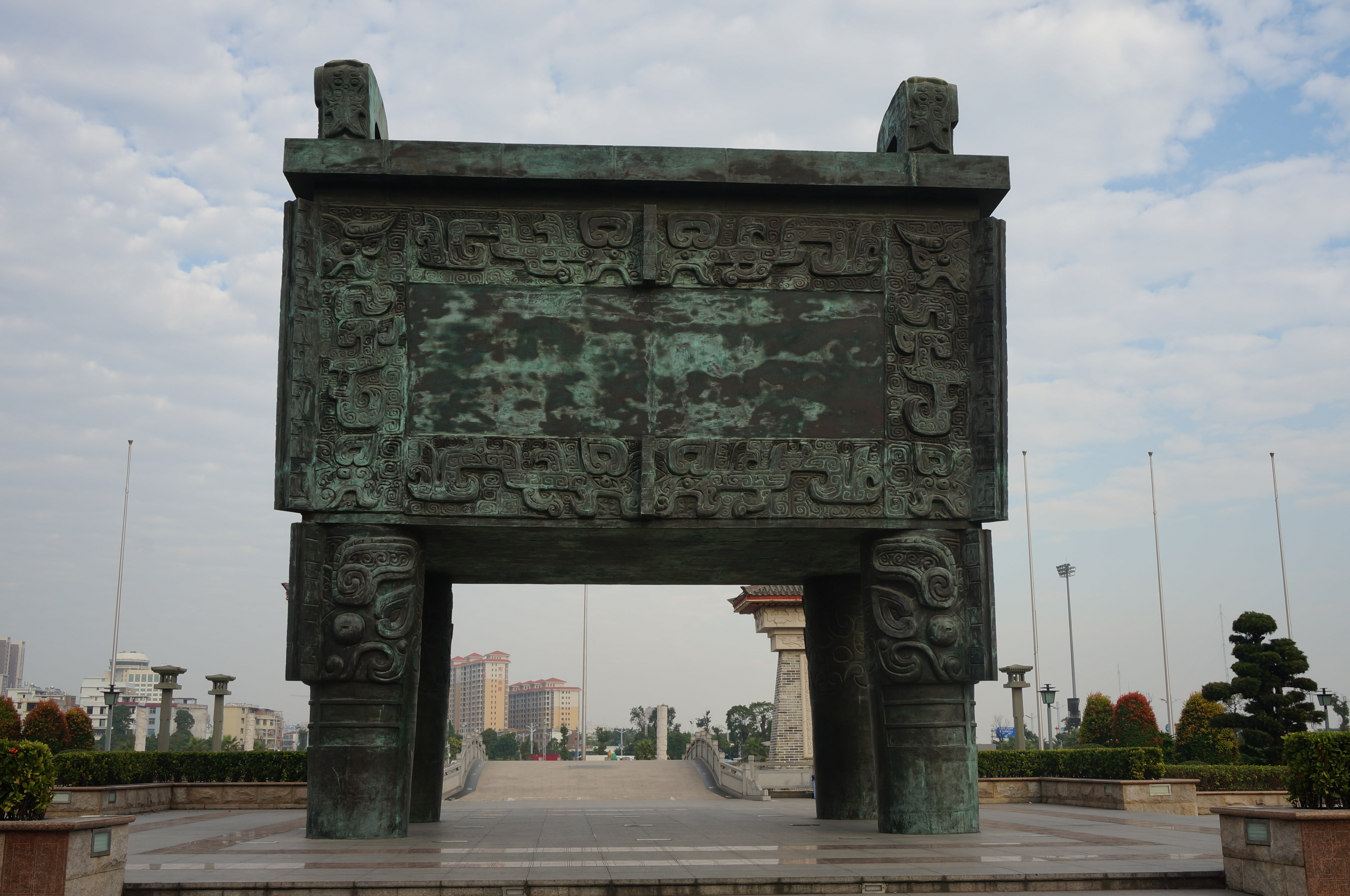
Bronze Tripod in Jieyang Tower Square

=== A bronze tripod ===
A bronze tripod is in the back of the square but in front of the Gate Tower. It is 9.99 meters (32.8 ft) high and weights 58 tons. It is said that this bronze tripod is the biggest and heaviest one in the world. The figure 9.99 sounds like "permanent existence" in Chinese. This tripod embodies Jieyang's permanent existence and lasting political stability.

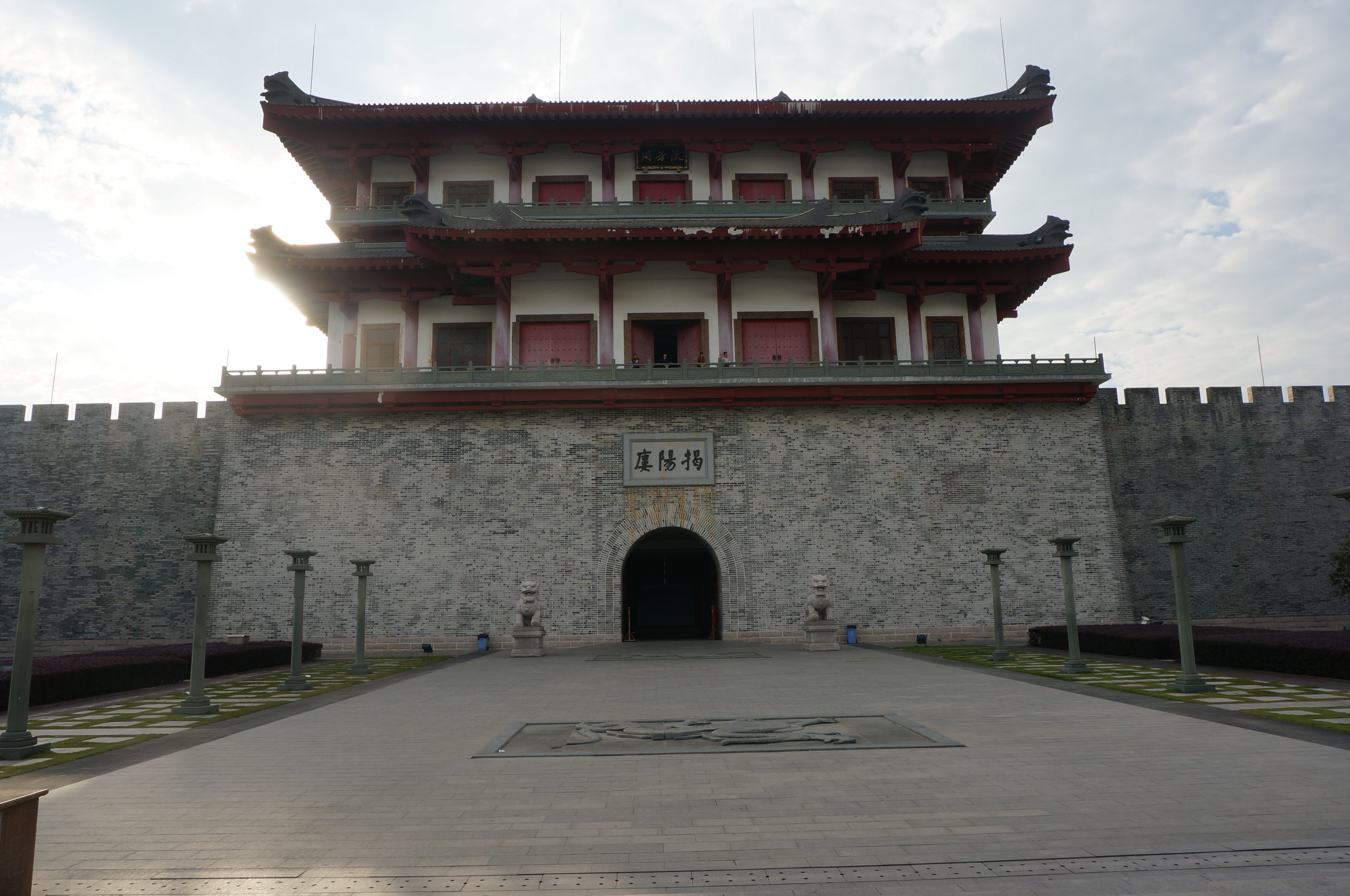
Jieyang Gate Tower

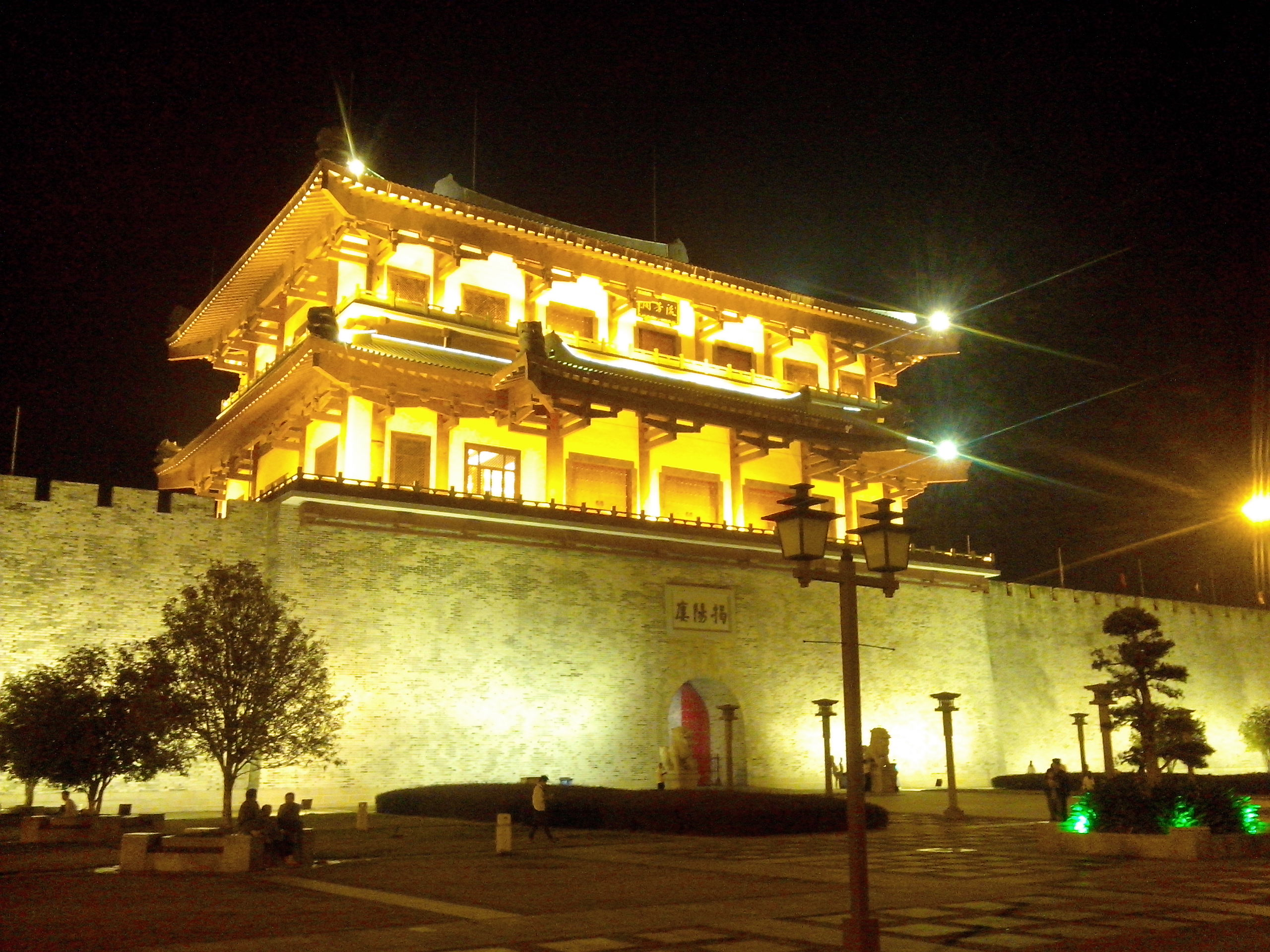
Jieyang Gate Tower in nightscape

=== Han Style Gate Tower ===
The Han style gate tower is in the east of the square. It is surrounded by a river called Hu Cheng He (护城河. The river separates the Gate Tower from the outside world, which is said to protect the Gate Tower. Also, this arrangement reflects the theme of the waterside city of south of the Five Ridges. The southwest of the Gate Tower is a stone tablet called Taihe (太和碑) on which is an article telling the basic information of Jieyang Tower, Jieyang city as well as the spirit of people in Jieyang. This Gate Tower was built in a Han style. It is 38 meters high and contains 5 storeys. Inside the Gate Tower are a series of museums showing the history of all the periods, architectural styles and folkways of Jieyang.

== Culture implication ==
- Symbolizes the history of Jieyang, the renaissance of Jieyang culture and the developing economy of the city.
- Implicates the spirit of generosity and gratitude of the Jieyang people.
- Attract more literati to make a contribution to Jieyang culture. After the reconstruction was finished, Jieyang Tower appealed to some famous Chinese people like Chen Shaoci (陈少慈) who wrote down a couplet hung on the columns of a hall.
