= Queshi Church =

Church in Guangdong Province, China

Coordinates: 23°20′22″N 116°40′38″E

Queshi Church (Chinese: 礐石堂; pinyin: Quèshí Táng), full name Queshi Church of Shantou Christianity, also known as Ling Tung Baptist Church, is located in the Queshi Scenic Area in Shantou, Guangdong Province, China. It is a rare large church in mainland China that combines Chinese and Western architectural styles, and has been listed among the provincial-level cultural relics protection units.

== History ==
Queshi Church was founded in 1863 by Rev. William Ashmore DD, a North American Baptist missionary who came to Shantou to spread the gospel in 1860. Its original site was in Big Queshi. At first, the church was a bungalow, and there were only a dozen believers, but, with the gradual increase of people coming here for worship, the chapel soon ran out of capacity.

The church was expanded in 1898, but the problem soon re-appeared as believers continued to increase.

In the 19th year of the Republic of China (1930), with the help of the American church, Queshi Church was re-built at its current location in Little Queshi as Ling Tung Baptist Church to commemorate the 70th anniversary of the gospel's introduction in Chaoshan, and worship services were moved here from Big Queshi.

During the Cultural Revolution, the church was closed and the buildings were used for other purposes, such as holding non-religious meetings and cultural activities.

The church was re-opened for worship in 1980, when it was renovated and the surrounding squares expanded. Large-scale maintenance was carried out again in 2008, from early January to May.

On April 19, 2019, Queshe Church was listed in the Guangdong Provincial Cultural Relics Protection Units.

== Buildings and architecture ==
The current church covers an area of approximately 4,000 square meters. Structurally, it is of a combination of Chinese and Western styles. The architectural style of its main seat and porch is Western Doric column style. The main entrance is supported by 6 granite columns, "Six" in the traditional Chinese concept is the number of "Sixty-six great fortunes". The seven steps embodies the complete number "seven" in the Bible. The main entrance includes three purely Western-style tall stone frame arch doors, representing the "Trinity" of Christian faith.

The four walls are made of granite stones too. The roof is of the traditional Chinese double-eaves roof with green glazed tiles on the top. There is a wall tile inscribed with the words "Ling Tung Christian Memorial Hall". The building's floor plan basically maintains the characteristics of Chaoshan Hakka residential architecture, but its facade adopts Western architectural form. This fusion of Chinese and Western styles makes the church look majestic, simple and elegant.

Near the main building lies the buildings of the former Zhengguang Girls' School (正光女子学校) (Note: In 1927, Zhengguang Girls' School (正光女子学校) was merged with Queshi Middle School (礐石中学) to form the private Queguang Middle School (礐光中学), which was later merged into the Guangdong Jinshan Middle School when the later moved from Chaozhou to Queshi in 1952.) and Ashmore Tiandao Theological Seminary (耶士摩天道神学院), both run by the Church. On the left side of the courtyard, the lawn is trimmed to spell out the word 'Emmanuel,' and on the right side, some missionary tombstones are placed.

== See also ==
- Queshi
- Dongshan Church (Guangzhou)
- Jieyang Church of Truth
- Chaozhou Heng'ai Church
- Xing Ruiming
