= Queshi =

Subdistrict of Shantou, Guangdong, China

Coordinates: 23°20′21″N 116°40′19″E

Queshi (simplified Chinese: 𬒈石; traditional Chinese: 礐石; pinyin: Quèshí; Chaozhou dialect: Kak-tsio̍h) is a town-level sub-district under the jurisdiction of Haojiang District, Shantou City, Guangdong Province, China. According to the census in 2020, Queshe has a population of 47,119 and a total area of 38.50 km², with the population density of 1,224/km².

== Administrative division ==
Queshi Subdistrict has the following 16 village-level administrative divisions:

- Queshi Community (simplified Chinese: 礐石社区; traditional Chinese: 礐石社區),
- Hongguang Community (红光社区; 紅光社區),
- Hongqi Community (红旗社区; 紅旗社區),
- Hongxing Community (红星社区; 紅星社區),
- Leikou Community (磊口社区; 磊口社區),
- Songshan Community (松山社区; 松山社區),
- Mianhua Community (棉花社区; 棉花社區),
- Aotou Community (澳头社区; 澳頭社區),
- Zhupu Community (珠浦社区; 珠浦社區),
- Gechen Community (葛陈社区; 葛陳社區),
- Gezhu Community (葛朱社区; 葛朱社區),
- Maobei Community (茂北社区; 茂北社區),
- Maonan Community (茂南社区; 茂南社區),
- Toucun Community (头村社区; 頭村社區),
- Zhongcun Community (中村社区; 中村社區),
- Weicun Community (尾村社区; 尾村社區).

== Queshi Scenic Area ==
Queshi Scenic Area covers an area of 20.77 square kilometers. It is located on the south bank of Queshi Sea, facing the old Shantou city on the other side. Originally the scenic area was an island, later became a peninsula due to the construction of a bridge to the southwest.

Queshi Scenic Area is among the first batch of provincial-level scenic spots in Guangdong Province and the first batch of national AAAA-level tourist areas in Chaoshan region, and it is the first of the eight scenic spots in Shantou.

== Shantou Jinshan Middle School ==
Shantou Jinshan Middle School is located in Queshi Scenic Area, covering an area of 107,000 square meters. There are approximately 3,600 students and 210 full-time teachers.

Founded in 1877 of the Qing Dynasty on the Jinshan Mountain in Chaozhou, the school has a history of over one hundred years.

In 1952, the school moved from Jinshan of Chaozhou to Queshi, Shantou City, and merged with the private Queguang Middle School (founded in 1927, a merger of Queshi Middle School and Zhengguang Girls' School). It was one of the 16 provincial key middle schools in Guangdong Province.

In 2007, Jinshan Middle School was identified as one of the first batch of national model high schools in Guangdong Province.

== Queshi Bridge ==
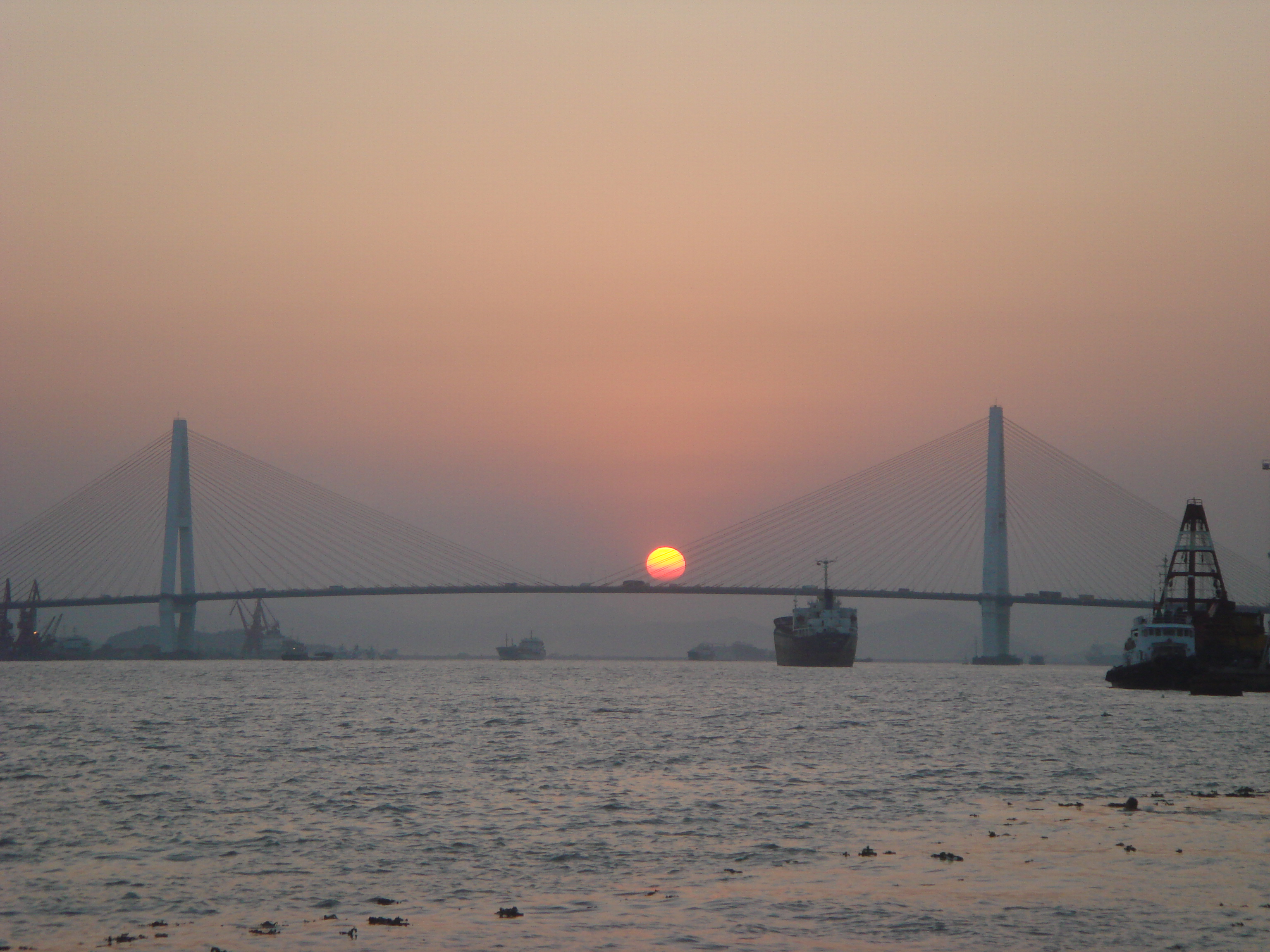
Queshi Bridge

The Queshi Bridge (礐石大桥) is 2,402 m long, with a deck width of 30.35 m and 6 lanes. The long span of 518 metres (1,699 ft) ranks it among the largest cable-stayed bridges in the world.

== Cultural relic protection units ==
=== Queshi Church ===
Queshi Church, also known as Ling Tung Baptist Church, is located in the Queshi Scenic Area. It is a rare large church in mainland China that combines Chinese and Western architectural styles, and has been listed among the provincial-level cultural relics protection units.

=== Former site of the British consulate ===
Founded in 1862, the former site of the British Consulate is located at No. 5, Shihai Bypass Road, Queshi Community. It is a provincial cultural relic protection unit announced by the provincial government in April 2019.

=== Yishi Hospital ===
Yishi Hospital (益世医院) was founded in Queshi Scenic Area in 1878. At that time, an American female doctor lived here for a long time, treating local people and living in harmony with them. Therefore, this place is called Doctor's Peak (医生顶) by the Queshi people. Yishi Hospital is the predecessor of the present Shantou Third People's Hospital in Queshi.

== See also ==
- Queshi Church
- Shantou
