= Haojiang, Shantou =

Haojiang 濠江区
- District
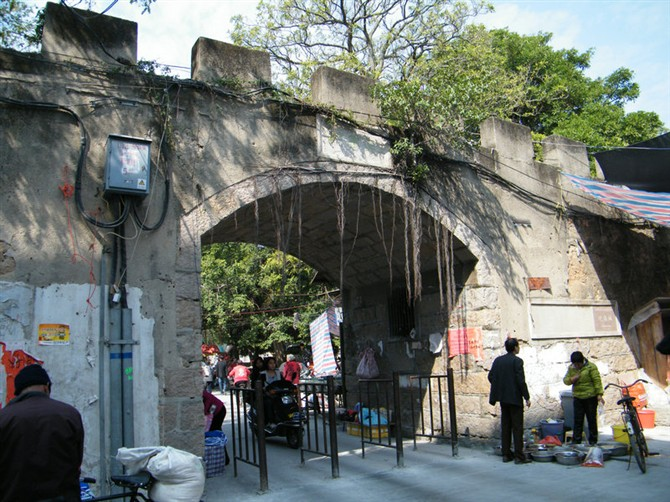
- Daohao Town East Gate

- Location of Haojiang in Shantou

- Location in Guangdong
- Coordinates: 23°17′N 116°43′E
- Country: People's Republic of China
- Province: Guangdong
- Prefecture-level city: Shantou

Area
  - Total: 179.9 km^{2} (69.5 sq mi)

Population (2020 census)
  - Total: 269,471
  - Density: 1,498/km^{2} (3,880/sq mi)
- Time zone: UTC+8 (China Standard)

Haojiang District (simplified Chinese: 濠江区; traditional Chinese: 濠江區; pinyin: Háojiāng Qū) is a district of Shantou, Guangdong province, People's Republic of China. It was established in March 2003, consisting the former Dahao (达濠) and Hepu (河浦) districts. It covers 134.88 square kilometres (52.08 sq mi). Dahao Island, which covers about 80 square kilometres (31 sq mi), is part of Shantou special economic zone, to the west of Chaoyang District. Overlooking across the Queshi sea (礐石海), there are Longhu District and Jinping District. Located on the coast of the South China Sea, Haojiang District has about 20 harbors. It has a population of 270,000 in 2020.

== Administrative division ==
Haojiang District is named after the Haojiang River within the territory and has seven sub-districts under its jurisdiction:

- Dahao Subdistrict (simplified Chinese: 达濠街道; traditional Chinese: 達濠街道; pinyin: Dáháo Jiēdào),
- Majiao Subdistrict (马窖街道; 馬窖街道),
- Queshi Subdistrict (礐石街道),
- Guang'ao Subdistrict (广澳街道; 廣澳街道),
- Binhai Subdistrict (滨海街道; 濱海街道),
- Hepu Subdistrict (河浦街道),
- Yuxin Subdistrict (玉新街道).
