= Chaoshan Vocational and Technical College =

ChaoShan Vocational and Technical College (Chinese: 潮汕职业技术学院)

Location
- No. 1, University Road, Puning City, Guangdong Province; 23°17′32″N 116°08′11″E

Information
- Type: Private
- Established: 1999
- Grades: junior college
- Website: http://chaoshan.cn/index.html

The Chaoshan Vocational and Technical College, abbreviated as "Chaoshan College" (Chinese: 潮汕學院), is a private higher vocational college established in 1999 with the approval of the Ministry of Education of the People's Republic of China. It is a National Demonstration Unit for Cultivating Innovative Talents. The campus is located in Puning City, Guangdong Province of China.

== History ==
In August 1999, the Chaoshan Vocational and Technical College was founded with the approval of the Ministry of Education of China.

In December 2006, the College passed the "National Higher Vocational Colleges Talent Training Level Assessment" by the Ministry of Education.

In 2009, the school was listed among the 24 colleges and universities whose operating conditions did not meet the standards of the Ministry of Education. These schools were limited in admission scale and urged to upgrade their education environment.

In 2012, Chaoshan Vocational and Technical College opened a Taobao class, and many students successfully started business on the commercial platform, which later raised fierce discussion on the media.

In 2013, the College won the title of "2013 China's Exemplary Unit for Cultivating Innovative Talents".

In 2020, the Entrepreneurship College (sub-college) was recognized as a "National-level Incubator"

== Sub-Colleges ==
There are four secondary colleges in Chaoshan Vocational and Technical College, including:

- Entrepreneurship College,
- Science and Engineering College,
- Business Administration College,
- Humanities College.

In addition, there are the Chaoshan Culture Research Center, the VR Modeling Center, and the Food and Drug Testing Center.

== Honors ==
The honors won by Chaoshan Vocational and Technical College include

- National Demonstration Unit for Cultivating Innovative Talents,
- National Cross-border E-commerce Talent Training Base,
- National-level Incubator,
- Guangdong Province's Higher Educational Institution with the Strongest Employment Guarantee.

== Other information ==
As of January 2024, there are 5,966 students and 366 staff members on campus, which covers an area of 129,514 square meters. And the school library has a collection of 547,000 copies of books.

The programs offered by the College features practical skills cultivation. The achievements in e-commerce entrepreneurship education are remarkable and have been highly praised by all sectors of society.

The College also admits international students.

Address: No. 1, University Road, Puning City, Guangdong Province, China.

== See also ==
- Puning City
- Chaoshan
- List of universities and colleges in Guangdong
- Jieyang Polytechnic
