= Jieyang Polytechnic =

Educational institution in Guangdong, China

Coordinates: 23.4795°N 116.3119°E

Jieyang Polytechnic 揭阳职业技术学院
- Motto: 誠真、篤教、博學、致用 (Sincerity, dedication to teaching, broad learning, and practical application)
- Type: Public higher educational institution
- Established: 1999
- Affiliations: Jieyang Government
- President: Luo Huiyuan
- Students: 7,867 (year 2024)
- Location: Zifeng Mountain Guizhu Garden Scenic Area, Rongcheng District, Jieyang City, Guangdong Province, China
- Website: www.jyc.edu.cn

The Jieyang Polytechnic, or "Jieyang Vocational and Technical College" (Chinese: 揭阳职业技术学院), shortly "Jieyang College" (Chinese: 揭阳学院), is the sole public higher educational institution in Jieyang, a city with a population of over five million located in east Guangdong Province of China. Founded in 1999, Jieyang Polytechnic now has over 7,000 students on campus and is run directly by the Jieyang Municipal People's Government.

== History ==
In 1999, Jieyang Polytechnic was established.

In 2002, Jieyang Polytechnic was officially founded with approval of the Guangdong Provincial Government.

In 2007, The Polytechnic passed the Ministry of Education's evaluation of talent cultivation.

In 2026, the Polytechnic Library opened its network accessment to CNKI (China National Knowledge Infrastructure).

== Departments ==
As of 2024, there are 11 teaching departments and schools in Jieyang Polytechnic:

- School of Marxism,
- Department of Teacher Education,
- Department of Information Engineering,
- Department of Foreign Languages,
- Department of Mechanical and Electrical Engineering,
- Department of Bioengineering,
- Department of Chemical Engineering,
- Department of Arts and Physical Education,
- Department of Economics and Management,
- School of E-commerce Entrepreneurship,
- Department of Continuing Education

== Other information ==
Jieyang Polytechnic's campus covers a land area of 586.826 mu (land), with a building area of 131,000 square meters.

So far, the Polytechnic has generated nearly 40,000 graduates, with and employment rate of over 95%. As of 2024, there are 7,867 full time students on campus. And there are 468 staff members.

The Polytechnic library has a collection of 780,000 books and nearly 1,000 kinds of newspapers and periodicals.

Jieyang Polytechnic cooperates with Beijing Normal University and other universities to run postgraduate courses.

Address: At the foot of Zifeng Mountain, Xianqiao Town, Rongcheng District, Jieyang City, Guangdong Province, China

== See also ==
- Jieyang City
- List of universities and colleges in Guangdong
- Chaoshan Vocational and Technical College
