= Chaozhou Heng'ai Church =

Church in Chaozhou, Guangdong, China

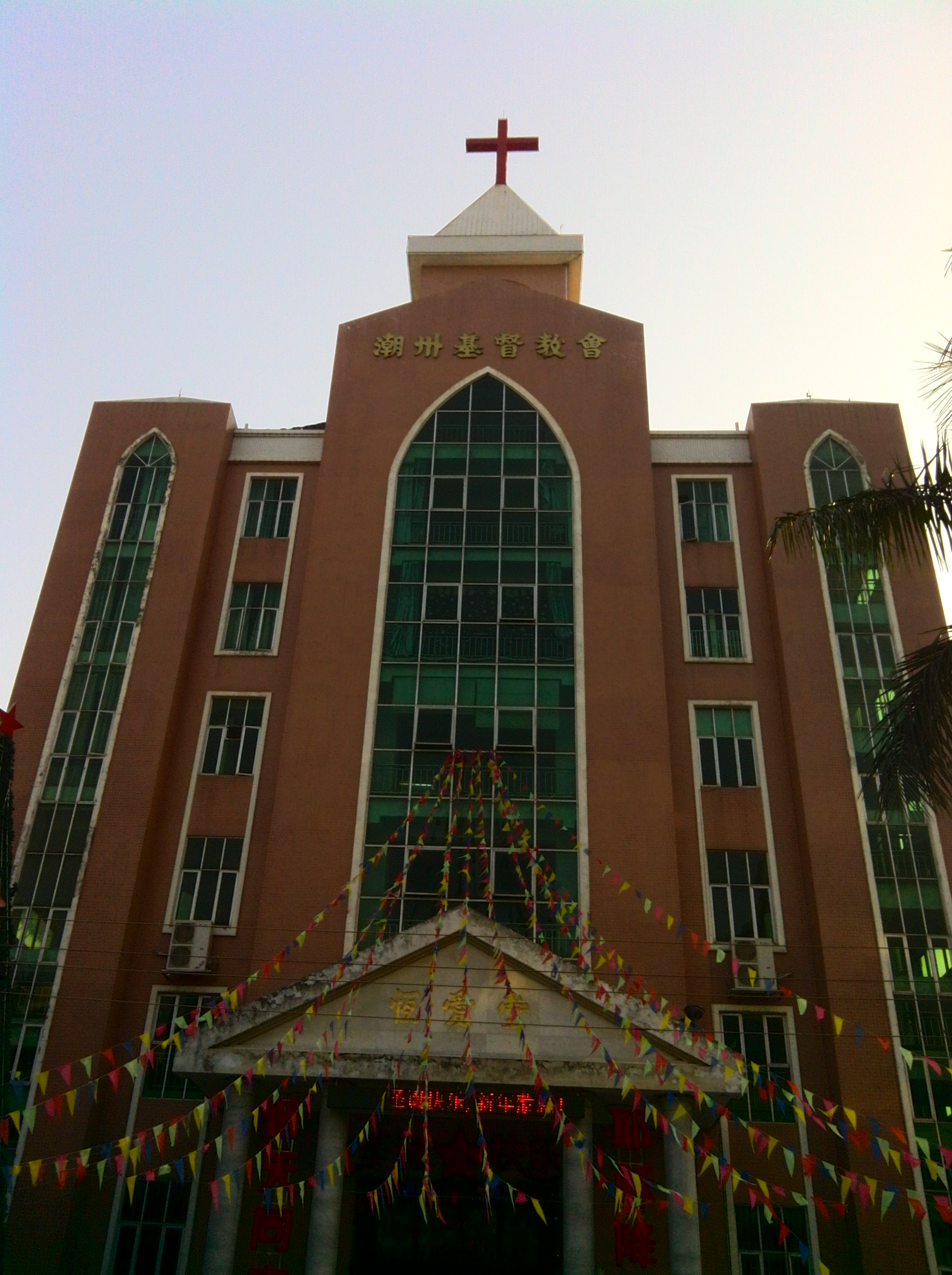
Chaozhou Heng'ai Church in 2015

Chaozhou Heng'ai Church (simplified Chinese: 潮州恒爱堂; traditional Chinese: 潮州恆愛堂; pinyin: Cháozhōu Héngàitáng; lit. 'Chaozhu Eternal-love Church'), full name Chaozhou City Christian Heng'ai Church, abbreviation Heng'ai Church, is the Main Urban Christian Church of Chaozhou City, Guangdong Province. It was originally a merger of the three denominations of the Reformed Presbyterian Church, the Baptist Church and the Seventh-day Adventist Church.

== History ==
In 1848, the Basel Mission of German and Swiss churches sent a pastor to preach in Longhu, Chaoan, but he was not tolerated by the local government.

Around 1856, the Presbyterian Church began to preach in Chaozhou urban area. Later, it moved to Fensi Back Alley, and then to Houdong. Finally, it built a church on the top of the South Embankment, which was later destroyed by the 1918 earthquake. In 1922, another church was built in Wanshou Palace. In 1924, the church was completed and a dedication ceremony was held. After that, the Presbyterian Church began to develop into towns such as Yixi.

In 1880, the American Baptist Church was introduced to Haiyang County and Raoping County of Chaozhou. In 1894, it was introduced to Chaozhou Prefecture capital (Fucheng). The American priest built two pastoral buildings in the Beacon Hill. He also successively established preaching centers in Mawang Temple, Shibaqu and other places in the city. In 1906, a church was built on Ximalu (West Road) and named "Lecture Hall". Later, the lecture hall was converted into a two-story building and renamed "City Center Church". In 1948, the Baptist Church began to develop into rural areas.

In 1907, Pastor Kang and Pastor Mai of the Seventh-day Adventist Church came to Fucheng to preach. In the same year, Elder Huang Xirong built a Seventh-day Adventist church in Shibaqu Lane.

After 1958, the three denominations of the original Presbyterian Church, the Baptist Church, and the Seventh-day Adventist Church jointly held services at the Chinese Christian Church in Wanshou Palace, Changli Road. During the Cultural Revolution, churches were closed, and believers, priests, nuns, and priests were persecuted.

After the Cultural Revolution, the Chaozhou City Christian Church was restored in 1983. The believers of the three sects united to live normal religious life in the original "City Center Church". At that time, there was only one church with an area of 180 square meters in the urban area, and it was a dilapidated old church that was more than a hundred years old. Therefore, the church leaders decided to build a new church and received support from the government.

On September 25, 1999, the Chaozhou Christian Association held a groundbreaking ceremony for the new church "Heng'ai Church" on Fengyuan Road, Xiangqiao District. Heng'ai Church was dedicated on Christmas Day 2000 and became the main church of the Chaozhou Christian society. The original City Center Church became an urban branch church where some elderly believers living in the old urban area lived religious lives.

== Architecture ==
Heng'ai Church covers an area of 4,995 square meters, has a construction area of 3,150 square meters, and can accommodate more than 1,000 people worshiping at the same time.

Besides the main worship hall, there is an auxiliary building called the Xinwang (belief and hope) Building, which provides facilities for various church ministries, including offices, meeting rooms, prayer rooms, and a music room.

== Management ==
Heng'ai Church has established a church committee, with members elected through democratic elections. There are 25 volunteer groups under the church committee, with a volunteer team of more than 200 people, responsible for the daily operations of the church.

Heng'ai Church currently has three resident pastors, one volunteer pastor, and two priests, who are responsible for the pastoral ministry of Hengai (main) church and the urban branch church.

== Honours ==
Heng'ai Church has been awarded the "Guangdong Province Model Religious Activity Venue" and "Standard Meeting Venue" plaques by the Provincial Ethnic and Religious Affairs Commission.

== See also ==
- Queshi Church
- Jieyang Church of Truth
- Dongshan Church (Guangzhou)
