= Jinxianmen Gate Tower =

Building in Guangdong Province, China

Coordinates: 23°32′15″N 116°21′11″E

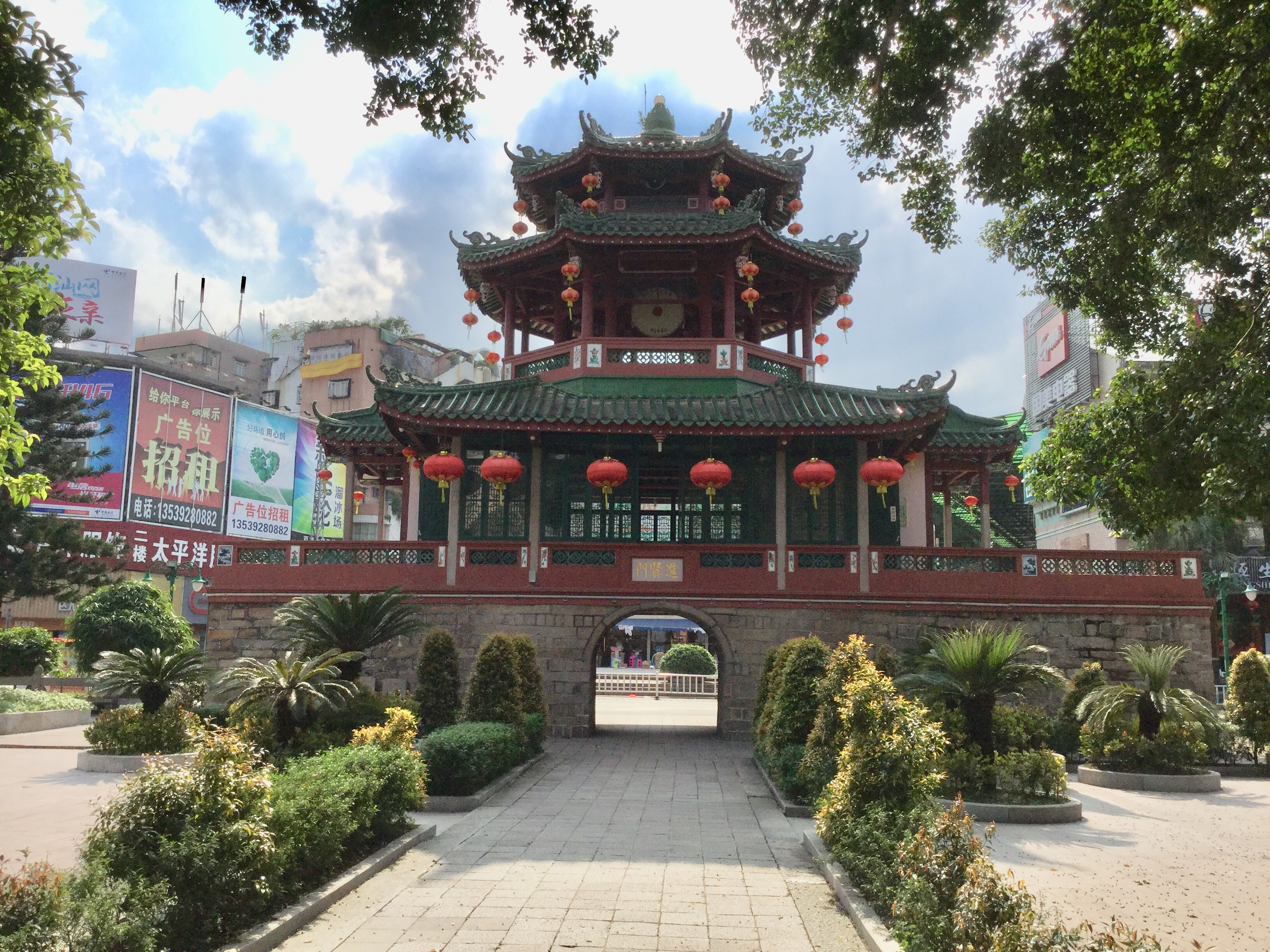
Jinxian Gate Tower

Jinxian Gate (simplified Chinese: 进贤门; traditional Chinese: 進賢門; pinyin: Jìnxián Mén; lit. 'enter wise gate'), or Jinxianmen Gate Tower (simplified Chinese: 进贤门城楼; traditional Chinese: 進賢門城樓), commonly known as the "Red Pavilion" (红亭), is a landmark building in Jieyang City, Guangdong Province, China. It is located on Huancheng Road, Rongcheng District. The gate, at 16.77 meters high and built of pure fir structure, is a provincial-level cultural relics protection unit.

== History ==
The Jinxian Gate Tower was built in the first year of Emperor Tianqi of the Ming Dynasty (1621), and "Jinxian" means "Admitting more wise men".

In 1993, Jieyang City announced this tower as a city- and county-level cultural relics protection unit in the ancient building type.

On December 10, 2015, Jinxian Gate was promoted to be listed in the Guangdong Provincial Cultural Relics Protection Units.

Jinxian Gate is located between the east and north gates of the original Jieyang Ancient City. Because the ancient city of Jieyang had not only 4 gates in the east, south, west and north like ordinary ancient cities, but had 5 gates. The extra one is Jinxian Gate, so it is not an ordinary city gate.

== Accident ==
On August 14, 2023, a red car crashed into the left side stepped supporting wall of Jinxian Gate due to a traffic accident, but the main structure of the cultural relic was not affected.

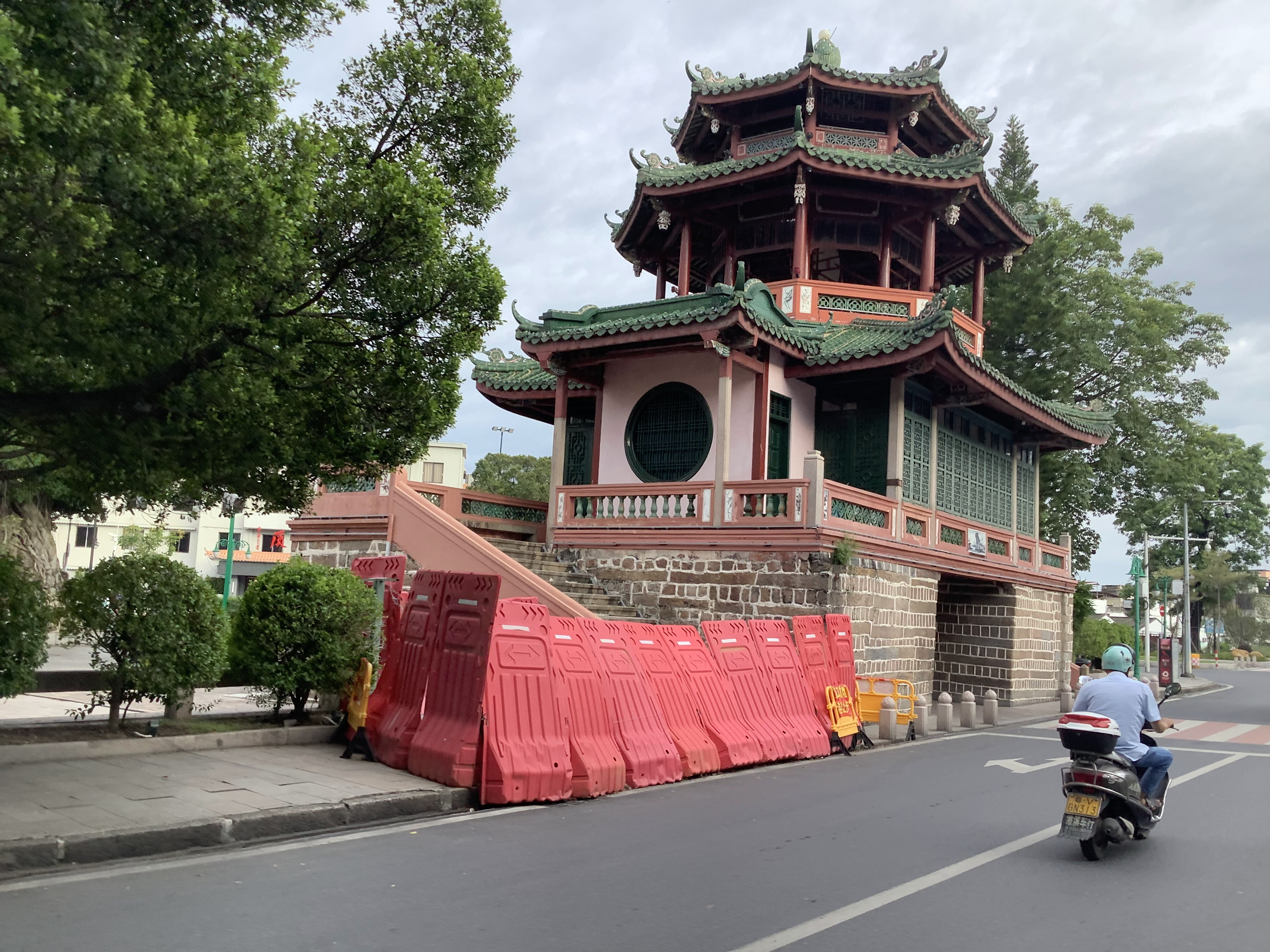
The supporting wall was hit

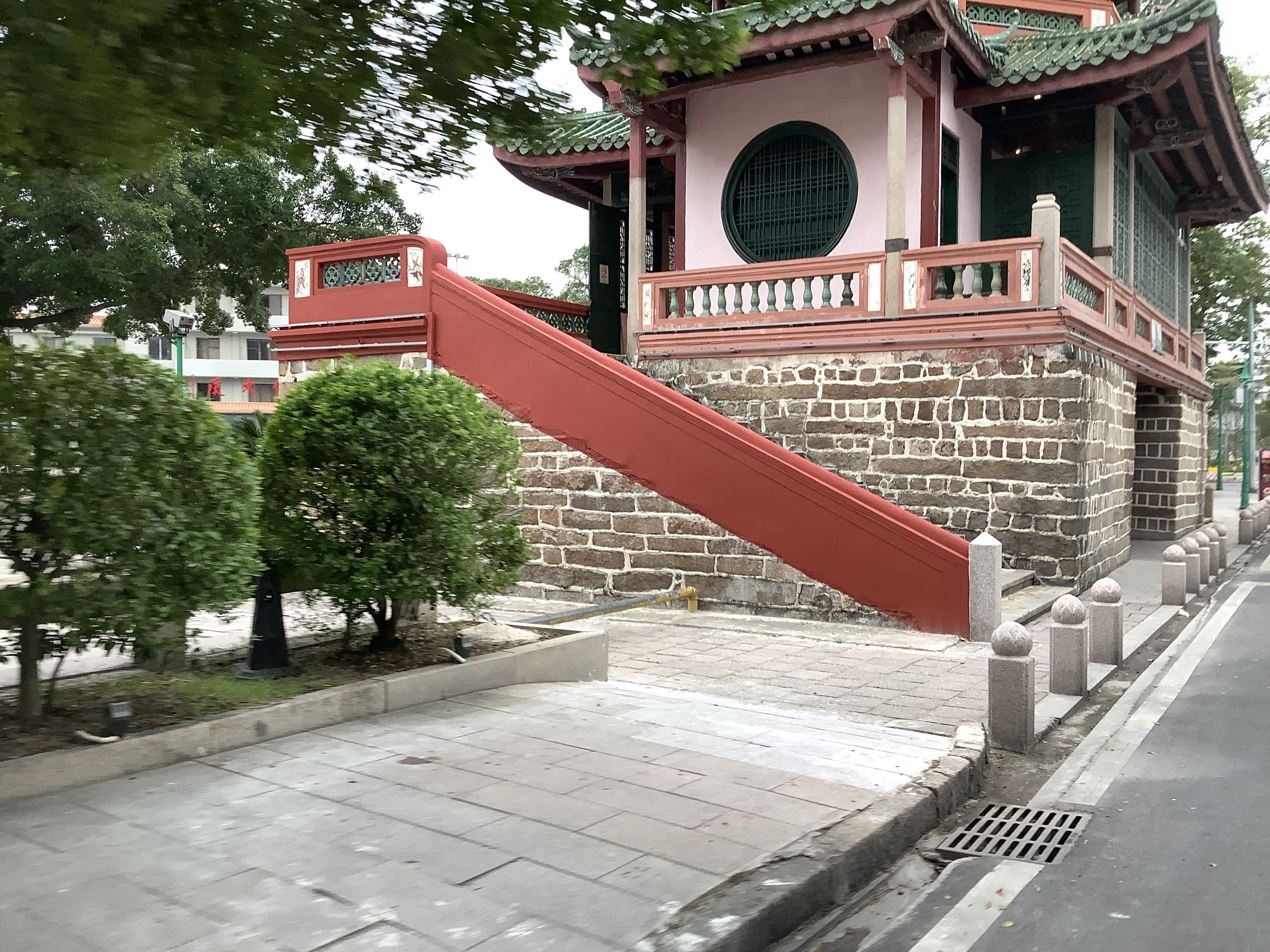
Repaired

== Gallery ==
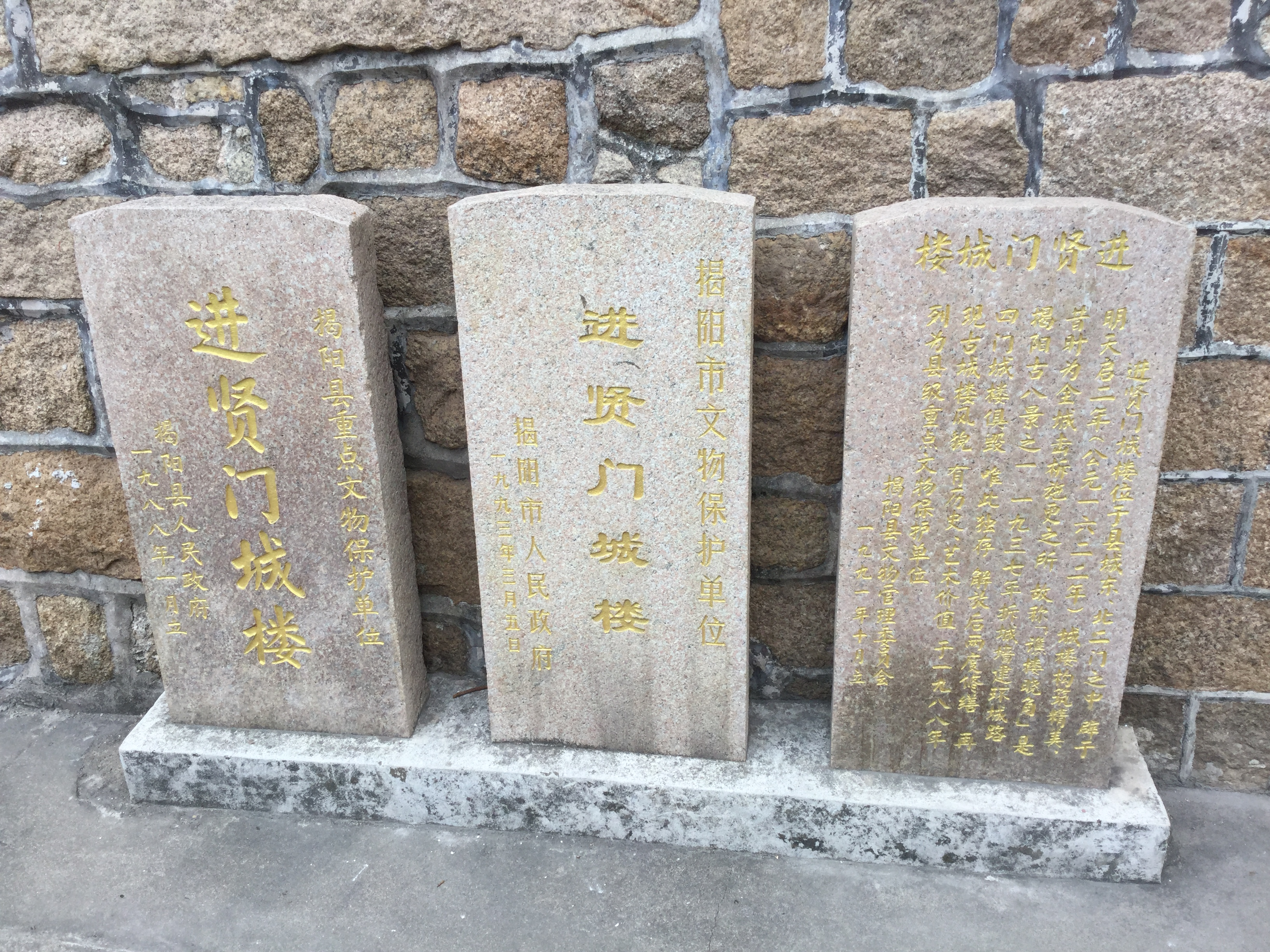
Inscriptions

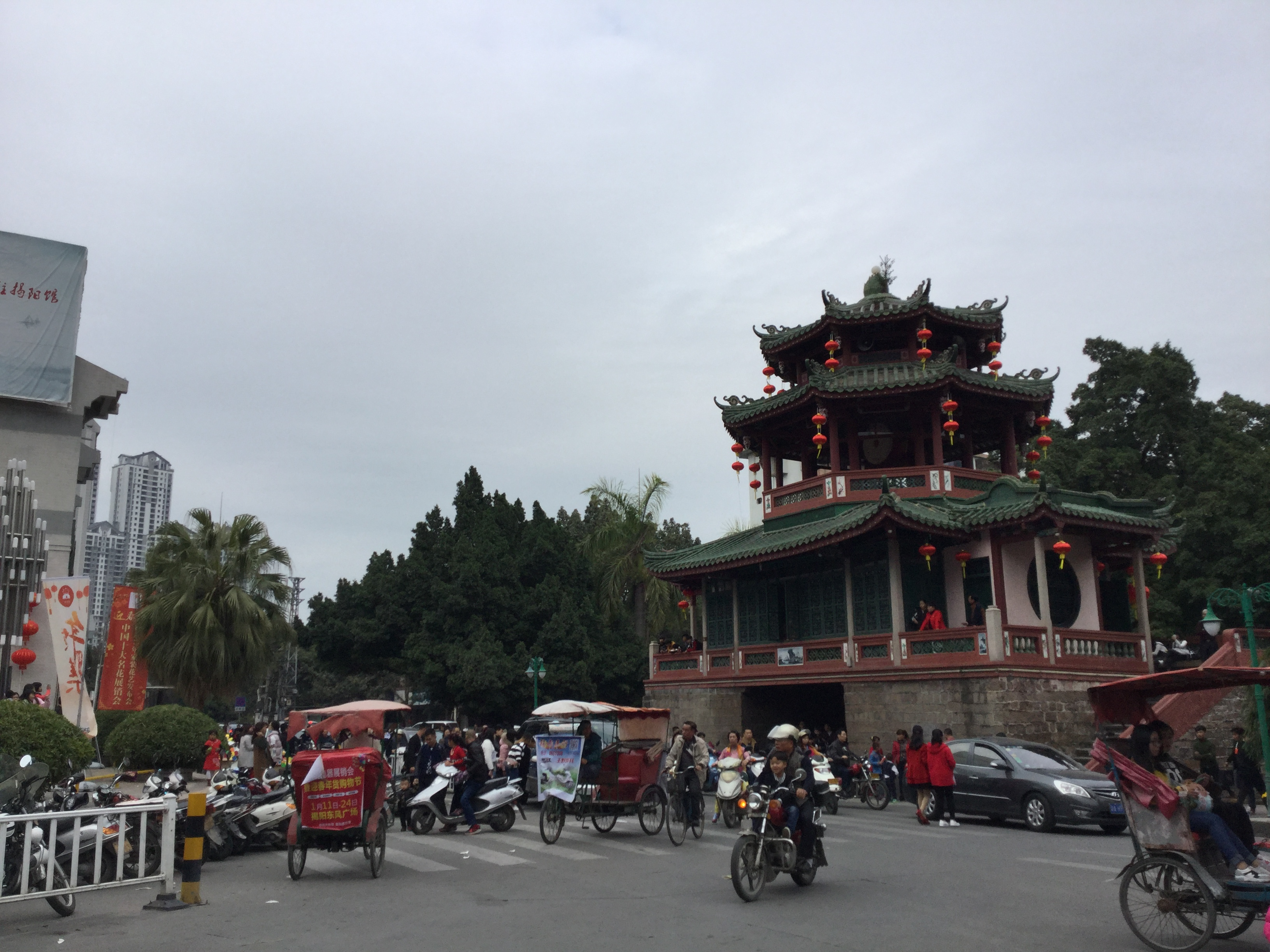
The road behind Jinxian Gate

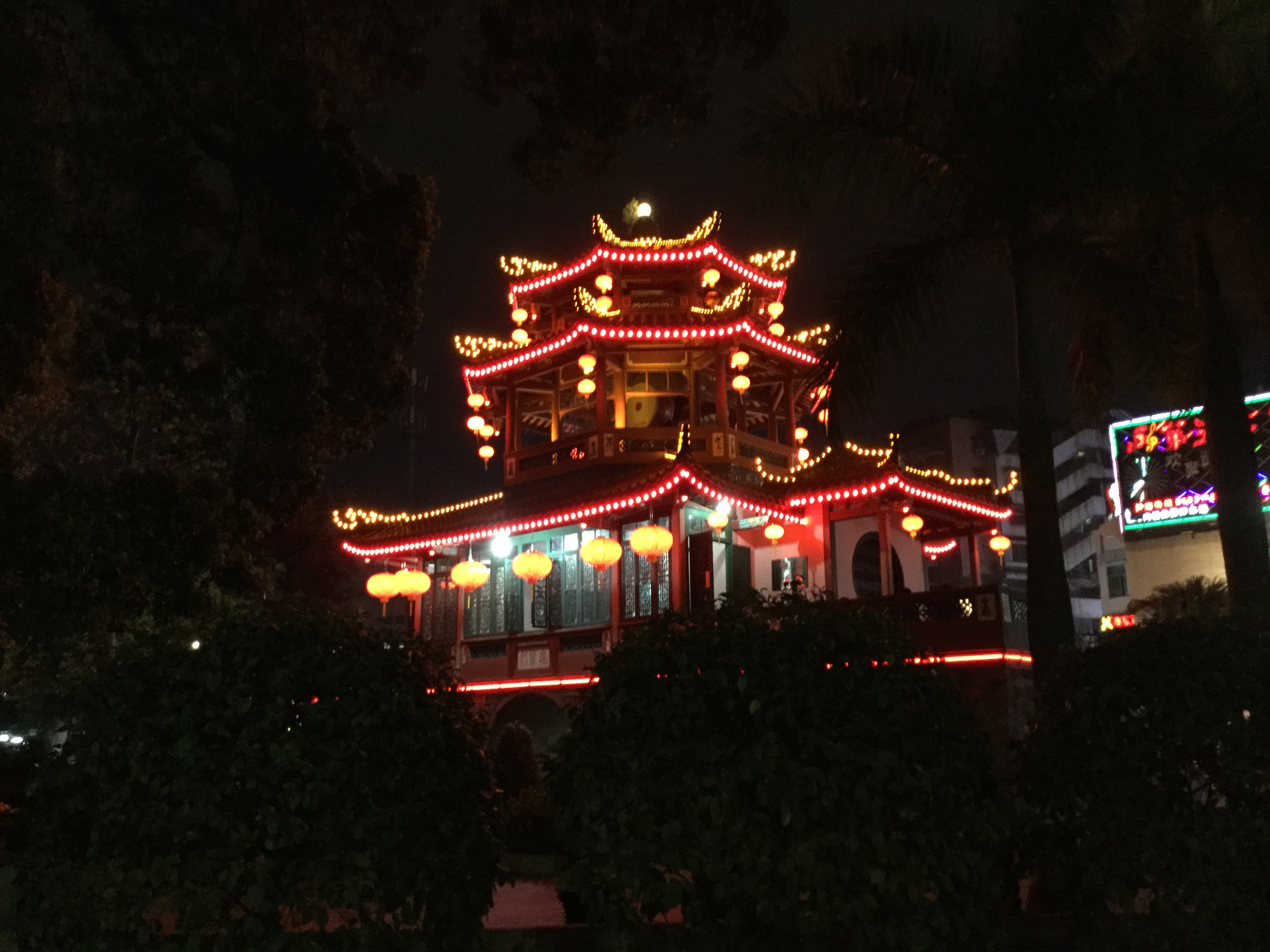
Jinxian Gate at night

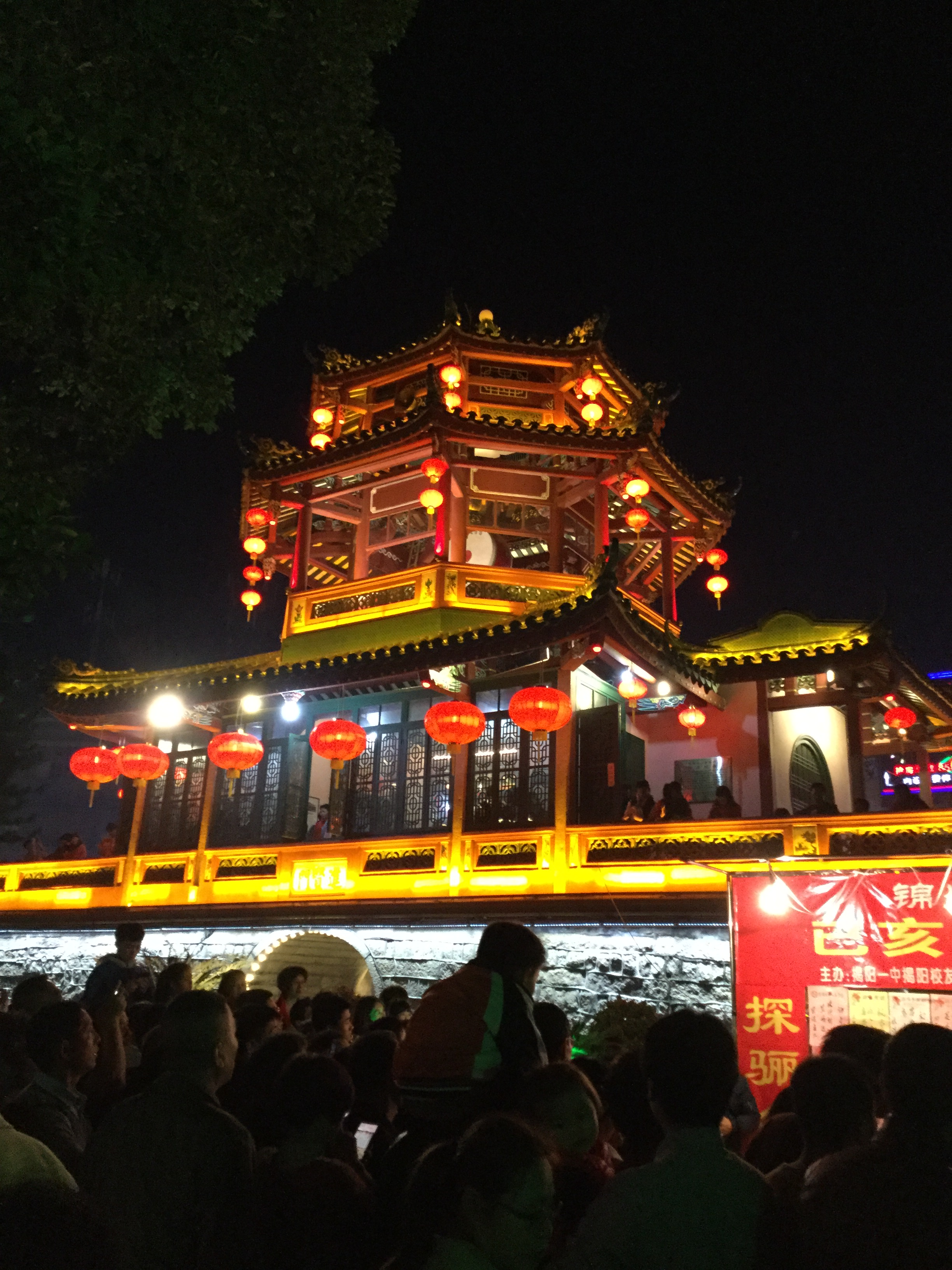
Jinxian Gate at night

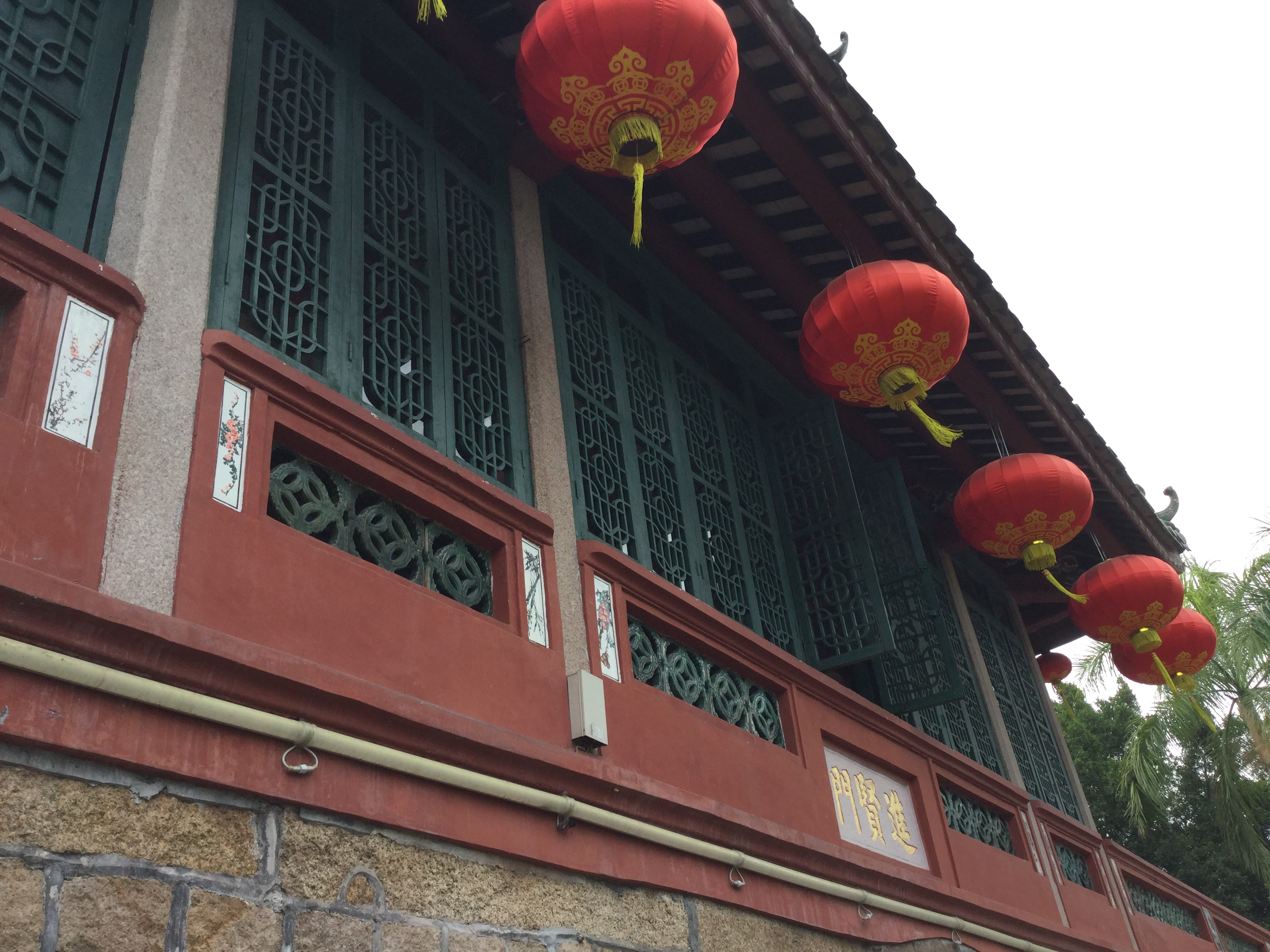
Jinxian Gate
