= Jieyang Chaoshan International Airport =

Commercial airport serving Jieyang, Guangdong, China

Jieyang Chaoshan International Airport 揭阳潮汕国际机场
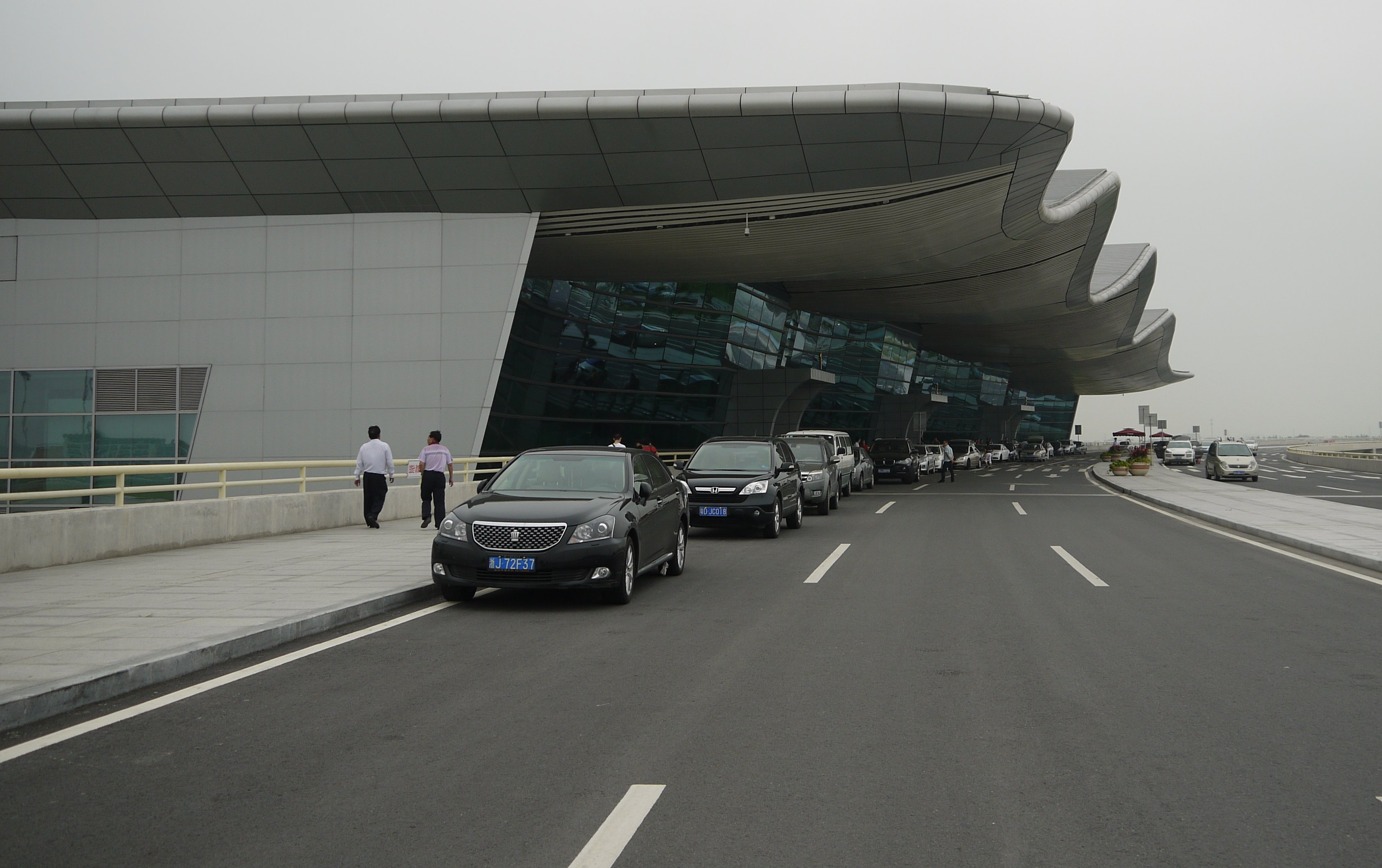
- IATA: SWA; ICAO: ZGOW

Summary
- Airport type: Public
- Operator: Shantou, Chaozhou, Jieyang Airport Cooperation; General Electric
- Serves: Chaoshan; Jieyang; Shantou; Chaozhou
- Location: Towns of Paotai and Denggang in Jiedong District, Jieyang, Guangdong, China
- Opened: 15 December 2011; 14 years ago
- Focus city for: China Eastern Airlines; China Southern Airlines
- Coordinates: 23°33′09″N 116°30′21″E
- Website: www.cs-airport.com

Map
- Location in Guangdong SWA/ZGOW (China)

Runways
Direction	Length		Surface
Direction	m	ft	Surface
04/22	3,200	10,499	Concrete

Statistics (2025)
- Passengers: 10,228,556
- Aircraft movements: 81,390
- Cargo (metric tons): 38,678.7
- Source: List of the busiest airports in the People's Republic of China

Jieyang Chaoshan International Airport
- Simplified Chinese: 揭阳潮汕国际机场
- Traditional Chinese: 揭陽潮汕國際機場
Transcriptions
Standard Mandarin
- Hanyu Pinyin: Jiēyáng Cháoshàn Guójì Jīchǎng
- IPA: [tɕjé.jǎŋ ʈʂʰǎʊ.ʂân kwǒ.tɕî tɕí.ʈʂʰàŋ]
Hakka
- Pha̍k-fa-sṳ: Ket-yòng Tshèu-Sân Koet-chi Kî-chhòng
Southern Min
- Teochew Peng'im: Gig⁴ion⁵ Dio⁵suan¹ Gog⁴zi³ Gi¹dion⁵

Jieyang Chaoshan International Airport (IATA: SWA, ICAO: ZGOW) is an international airport serving the cities of Jieyang, Shantou and Chaozhou in South Central China's Guangdong province. It is located in the towns of Paotai and Denggang in Jiedong District, Jieyang, Guangdong. It was part of a relocation plan from the original Shantou Waisha Airport, and the site was chosen to be near the geographic center of Jieyang, Shantou, and Chaozhou. The airport was put into service on 15 December 2011, with the simultaneous shut-down of Shantou Waisha Airport as a commercial airport.

According to the Civil Aviation Administration of China, in 2025, Jieyang Chaoshan International Airport recorded 81,390 flight takeoffs and landings, and 10.229 million passenger movements, representing a year-on-year increases of 15.5% and 18.0% respectively.

== History ==
The city of Shantou was formerly served by Shantou Waisha Airport, a dual-use military and civil airport. Construction of Jieyang Chaoshan Airport began on 16 June 2009 with a total investment of 3.8 billion yuan. In November 2011, the Chinese Ministry of Environmental Protection halted the construction of the airport due to unauthorized deviations from the approved environmental impact report. The airport authorities submitted a revised environmental impact report, which gained approval from the ministry. Jieyang Chaoshan Airport was opened on 15 December 2011, when all civil flights were transferred from the old Waisha Airport, which remains in use as a military air base. On 10 July 2014, the Chinese government officially gave the airport international status, after having operated international flights for a number of years already.

On December 5, 2019, Jieyang Chaoshan International Airport completed its runway extension project, increasing the runway length from the original 2,800 meters to 3,200 meters. With this upgrade, the airfield classification was raised from 4D to 4E, enabling the airport to accommodate wide‑body aircraft such as the Boeing 787 and Airbus A330. This enhancement laid the foundation for launching direct long‑haul routes to Europe and North America.

As of December 2022, the terminal building covered 113,000 square meters, with 56 civil aviation stands. The runway was 3,200 meters long and 45 meters wide. The airport was designed to handle 14.5 million passengers annually, 90,000 tons of cargo and mail, and 100,000 aircraft movements.

In 2024, the airport recorded a total of 70,498 aircraft movements and 8.666 million passengers for the year, representing year‑on‑year increases of 16.2% and 20.7% respectively. During the 2024 Spring Festival travel period, daily passenger throughput exceeded 37,000, with 264 aircraft movements—both new historical highs.

For the 2024–2025 winter–spring flight season, Jieyang Chaoshan International Airport had 25 airlines in operation, with 1,862 weekly flights, serving 71 destinations and operating 81 routes.

Jieyang Chaoshan International Airport is the largest operating base for the domestically produced ARJ21 regional jet (now commonly known as C909). From January to August 2025, the C909 aircraft operated 18,494 flights at Jieyang Chaoshan Airport, accounting for 34% of total airport movements, with an annual growth rate of 48.5%.

== Terminals ==
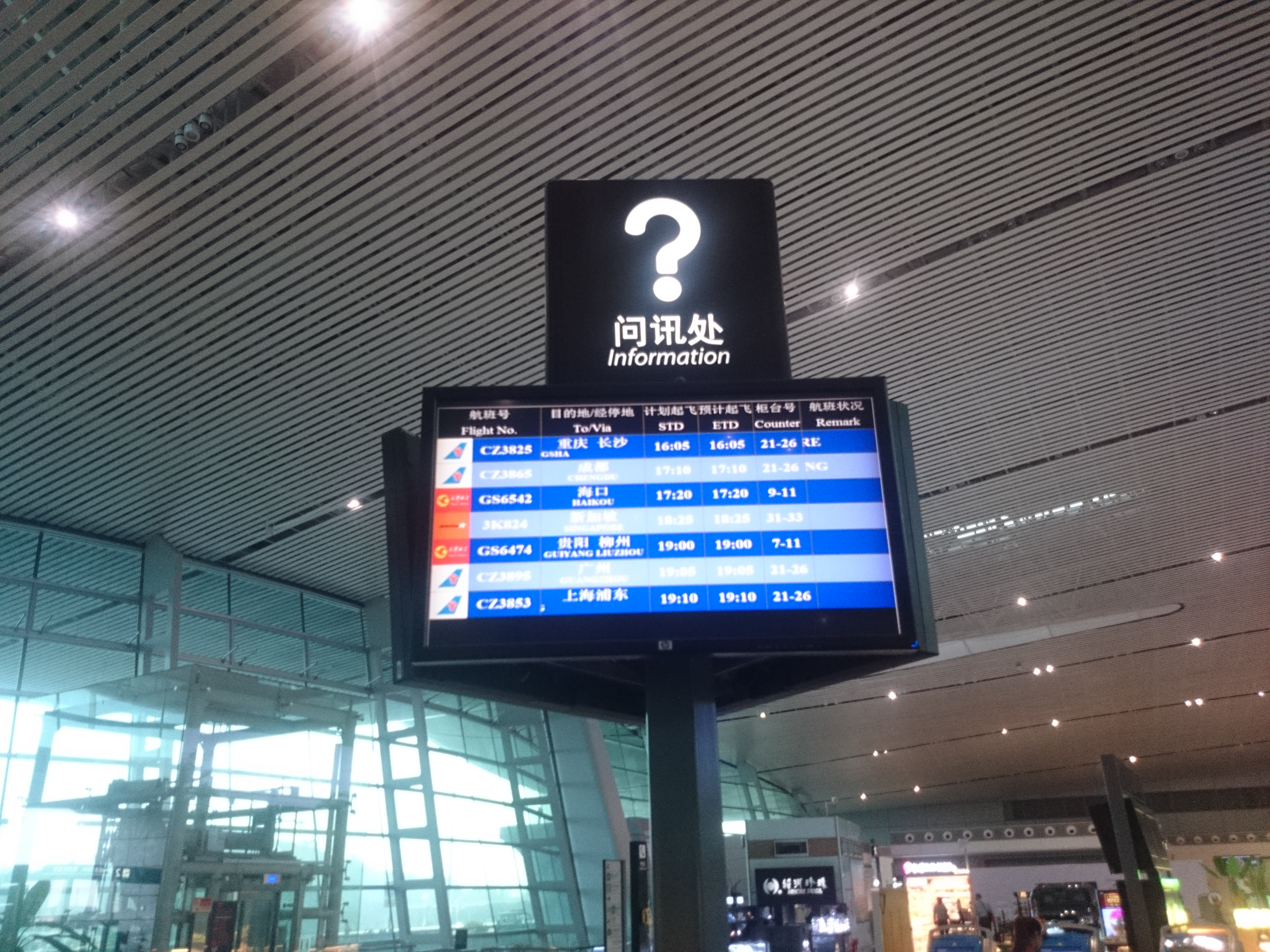
Information center in Jieyang Chaoshan International Airport

The airport covers an area of 113,000 square metres (1,220,000 square feet) after the completion of a terminal expansion project in December 2022, doubling the airport terminal area through the additional of a second terminal wing. This upgrade allowed for the terminal design capacity to increase from 4.5 million to 14.5 million passengers annually. A previous airport expansion extended the length of the runway from 2,800 to 3,200 metres (9,200 to 10,500 ft) in order to upgrade it to a code 4E runway.

The passenger terminal has 26 jetways with 22 allocated to domestic flights, two allocated to international flights and two dual-use jetways.

A second check-in terminal is available outside Shantou Railway Station.

== Airlines and destinations ==
In 2025, Jieyang Chaoshan International Airport operated 77 domestic and international routes, reaching 67 destinations.

=== Passenger ===
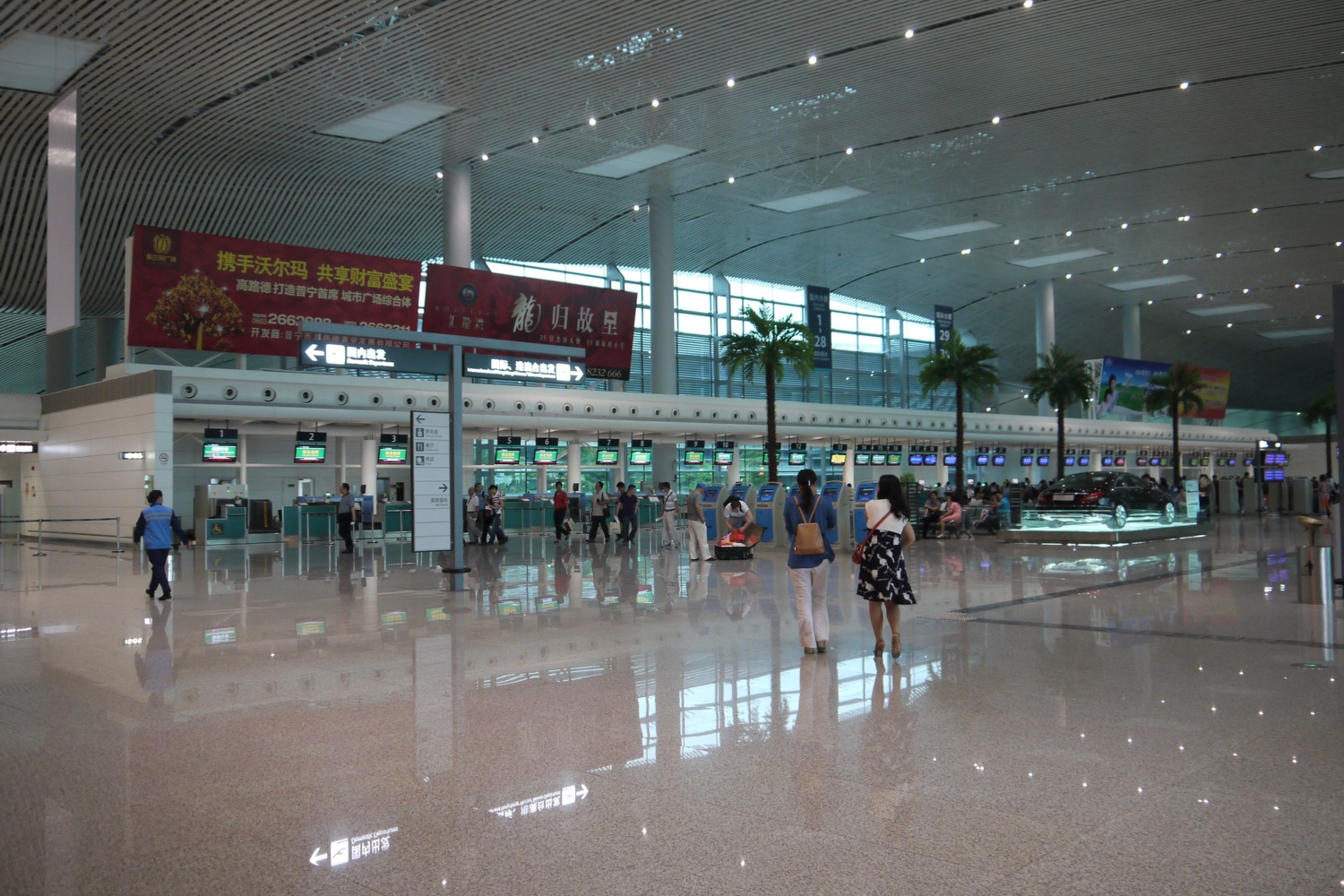
Departures area

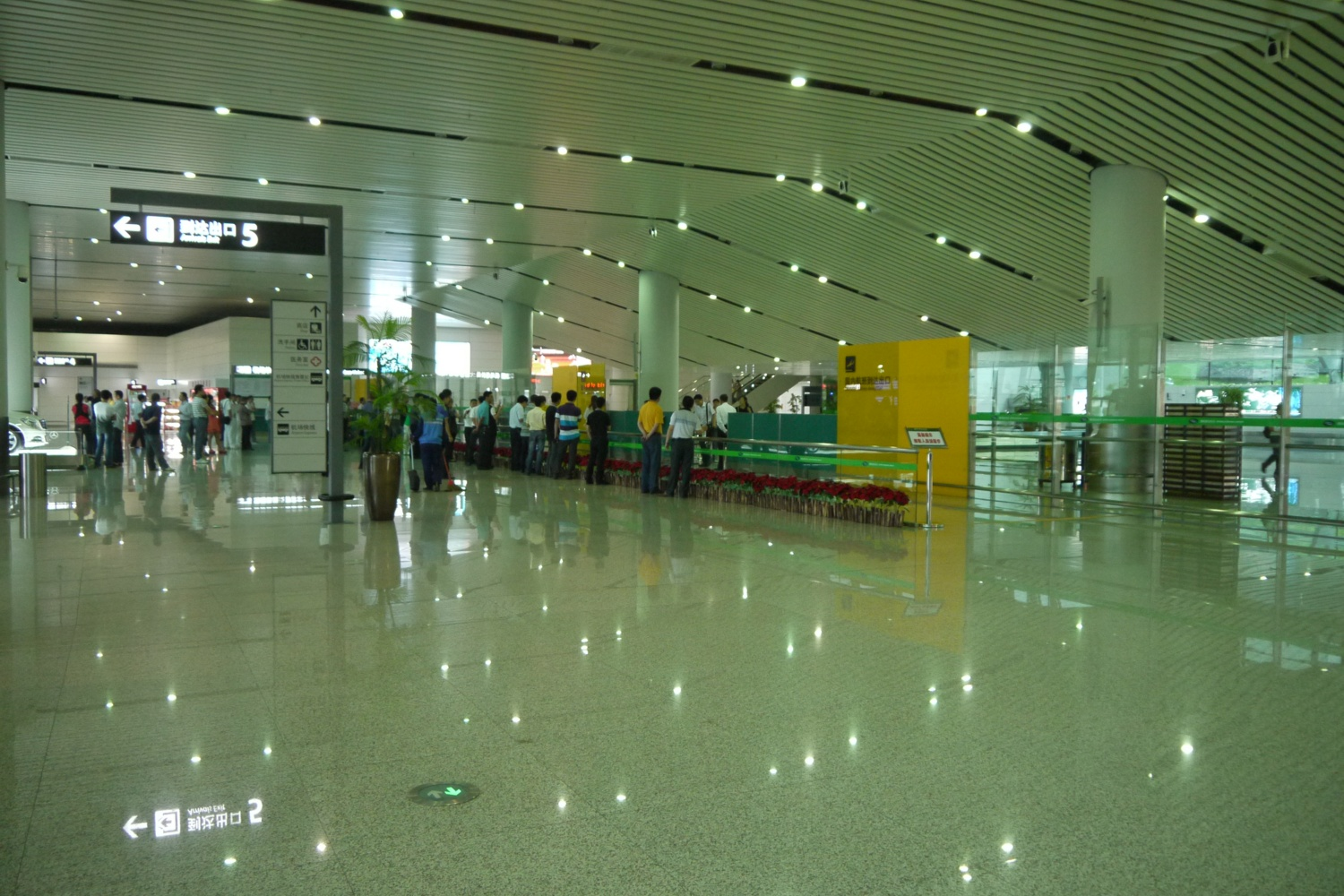
Arrivals area

Airlines	Destinations
AirAsia	Kuala Lumpur–International
Air China	Beijing–Capital, Beijing–Daxing, Chengdu–Tianfu, Hangzhou, Wuhan
Beijing Capital Airlines	Haikou, Lijiang, Nanning
Chengdu Airlines	Chengdu–Shuangliu, Chengdu–Tianfu, Dazhou, Shaoguan
China Eastern Airlines	Changsha, Changzhou, Guilin, Hangzhou, Hefei, Huai'an, Kunming, Lanzhou, Nanjing, Ningbo, Shanghai–Hongqiao, Shanghai–Pudong, Taiyuan, Wenzhou, Wuhan, Wuxi, Xi'an, Zhanjiang
China Express Airlines	Xi'an, Zhangjiajie
China Southern Airlines	Bangkok–Suvarnabhumi, Beijing–Daxing, Changchun, Changsha, Changzhou, Chengdu–Tianfu, Chongqing, Dalian, Guangzhou, Guiyang, Haikou, Hangzhou, Hohhot, Jinan, Kunming, Lianyungang, Linyi, Lishui, Nanjing, Nantong, Nanyang, Ningbo, Qingdao, Shanghai–Pudong, Taizhou, Tianjin, Urumqi, Wuhan, Xuzhou, Yancheng, Yichang, Yiwu, Zhengzhou, Zhoushan
China United Airlines	Beijing–Daxing
Chongqing Airlines	Chongqing
Hainan Airlines	Haikou, Hangzhou
Juneyao Air	Shanghai–Pudong
Lucky Air	Kunming
Okay Airways	Changsha, Chengdu–Tianfu, Hangzhou, Tianjin
Ruili Airlines	Mangshi
Scoot	Singapore
Shanghai Airlines	Changchun, Kunming, Nanjing, Shanghai–Hongqiao, Shanghai–Pudong, Zhengzhou, Zhoushan
Shenzhen Airlines	Nantong
Sichuan Airlines	Chengdu–Tianfu, Chongqing
Spring Airlines	Bangkok–Suvarnabhumi, Changchun, Changsha, Changzhou, Chengdu–Tianfu, Dalian, Haikou, Hangzhou, Harbin, Hefei, Lanzhou, Nanjing, Ningbo, Shanghai–Hongqiao, Shanghai–Pudong, Shenyang, Shijiazhuang, Wuhan, Xi'an, Yangzhou, Yining
Tianjin Airlines	Haikou, Tianjin
Urumqi Air	Nanchong, Urumqi
West Air	Chongqing, Nanjing, Zhengzhou
Xizang Airlines	Nanchong, Xining

== Ground transportation ==
The airport is served by the adjacent Jieyang Airport railway station. A station will also be constructed at the airport as part of the East Guangdong Intercity Railway with construction expected to be completed in 2027.

== Statistics ==
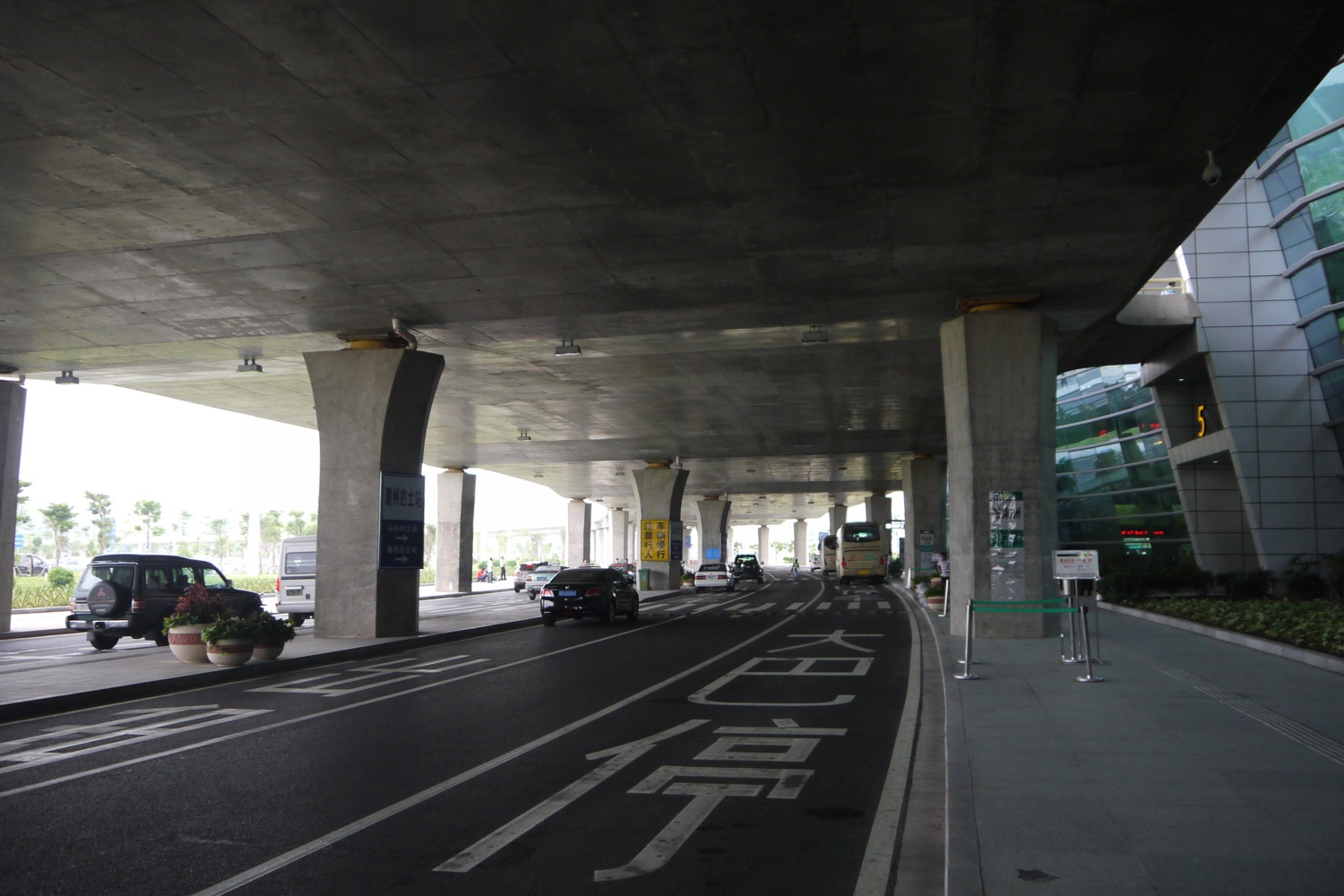
Outside the arrivals area

Jieyang Chaoshan Airport is among the 50 busiest passenger airports in China.

Year	Passenger movements	Change
2025	10,228,556	▲18.9%
2024	8,665,819	▲20.7%
2023	7,182,236	▲102.3%
2022	3,550,722	▼38.1%
2021	5,734,175	▲8.5%
2020	5,285,718	▼28.1%
2019	7,353,521	▲13.2%
2018	6,493,930	▲44.8%
2017	4,485,000	▲17.5%
2016	3,818,000	▲19.2%
2015	3,204,300	▲11.6%
2014	2,870,252	▲6.9%
2013	2,686,007	▲27.7%
2012	2,103,303	▲10.6%

== Incident ==
On the evening of July 9, 2025, thunderstorms caused lightning damage to the runway at Jieyang Chaoshan International Airport, forcing the airport to close while emergency repairs were carried out and inbound flights were diverted. After the repair work, the runway reopened later that night and flight operations gradually resumed.

== See also ==
- Shantou Waisha Airport
- List of airports in China
