= Jiedong, Jieyang =

Jiedong 揭东区
- District
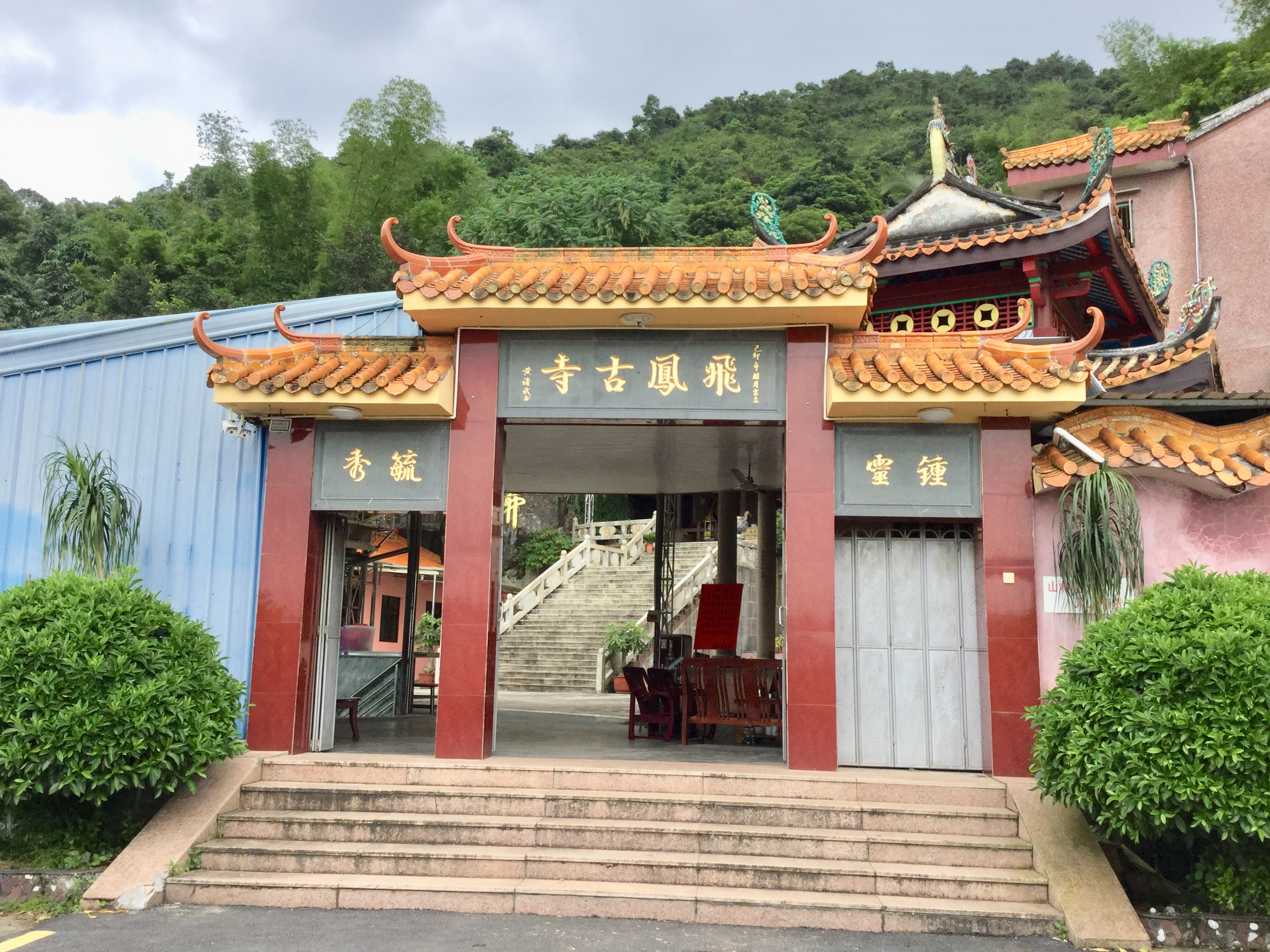
- Feifeng Temple

- Location in Guangdong
- Coordinates: 23°34′N 116°25′E
- Country: People's Republic of China
- Province: Guangdong
- Prefecture-level city: Jieyang

Area
  - Total: 850 km^{2} (330 sq mi)

Population (2020)
  - Total: 931,719
  - Density: 1,100/km^{2} (2,800/sq mi)
- Time zone: UTC+8 (China Standard)

Jiedong District (simplified Chinese: 揭东区; traditional Chinese: 揭東區; pinyin: Jiēdōng Qū; Teochew: gêg4 dong1 ku1), formerly Jiedong County, is a district of eastern Guangdong province, China. It is under the administration of Jieyang City. According to the 2020 Chinese census, the district has a population of 931,719 under its hukou (household registration) system. Amongst them, 507,382 are downtown residents.

== History ==
In December 1991, Guangdong Province adjusted the administrative divisions of the Jieyang region, abolishing Jieyang County (揭陽縣) and establishing county‑level Jiedong County (揭東縣) and the prefecture‑level city of Jieyang (揭陽市). The original Jieyang County was split: the county seat and surrounding areas were reorganized as Rongcheng District (榕城區), while most of the remaining towns were carved out to form Jiedong County, which administered 15 towns including Quxi (曲溪鎮), Longwei (龍尾鎮), and Baita (白塔鎮). The county government was located in Quxi Town. The eastern part of the former Jieyang County, including Lantian (藍田鎮), Paotai (炮台鎮), and Denggang (登崗鎮) became part of Jiedong County, which was named for its position east of the former Jieyang county seat (揭陽縣城).

By 1999, Jiedong County administered 15 towns: Quxi (曲溪鎮), Yunlu (雲路鎮), Yujiu (玉窖鎮), Denggang, Paotai, Didu (地都鎮), Linpan (霖磐鎮), Baita, Longwei, Yuecheng (月城鎮), Guiling (桂嶺鎮), Xinheng (新亨鎮), Yuhu (玉湖鎮), Xichang (錫場鎮), and Putian (埔田鎮).

On February 6, 2006, the Guangdong Provincial Department of Civil Affairs approved the abolition of Quxi Town and the establishment of Quxi Subdistrict (曲溪街道). From then on, the county governed one subdistrict and fourteen towns.

After Jiedong County was abolished and reorganized as a district in December 2012, parts of the former county were further adjusted. In March 2013, the three towns of Paotai, Denggang, and Didu were officially placed under the administration of Rongcheng District. This adjustment was part of a large‑scale administrative reorganization carried out by Jieyang City to promote the development of the “Airport Economic Zone,” with the main goal of integrating resources and advancing an airport‑centered economy built around Jieyang Chaoshan International Airport.

In 2013, Jieyang City carried out an administrative reorganization and established Lancheng District (藍城區), formally known as the “Jieyang Lancheng District Administrative Committee” (揭陽市藍城區管委會). Its name was derived from the historical “Lantian Du” (藍田都). At the time, Lancheng District was formed from several towns carved out of the former Jiedong County, including Pandong, Linpan, Yuecheng, Baita, and Guiling.

== Notable events ==
=== 2026 animal abuse case ===
In June 2026, videos showing four minors from Pingpu Village, Xinheng Town, Jiedong District repeatedly abusing and ultimately killing a stray mother dog and her puppies circulated online, attracting widespread public attention in China. The incident prompted public condemnation and renewed discussion about the absence of a comprehensive national law prohibiting cruelty to companion animals in China, as well as the handling of serious acts of animal abuse committed by juveniles. Local authorities stated that the four minors had been placed in specialised education facilities and that schools and guardians had been instructed to strengthen supervision.

== Administrative divisions ==
Jiedong District has 2 sub-districts and 11 towns under its jurisdiction:

- Quxi sub-district (Chinese: 曲溪街道),
- Pandong sub-district (磐东街道; 磐東街道),
- Yunlu Town (云路镇; 雲路鎮),
- Yujiao Town (玉滘镇; 玉滘鎮),
- Linpan Town (霖磐镇; 霖磐鎮),
- Yuecheng Town (月城镇; 月城鎮),
- Baita Town (白塔镇; 白塔鎮),
- Longwei Town (龙尾镇; 龍尾鎮),
- Guiling Town (桂岭镇; 桂嶺鎮),
- Xichang Town (锡场镇; 錫場鎮),
- Xin Heng Town (新亨镇; 新亨鎮),
- Yuhu Town (玉湖镇; 玉湖鎮),
- Putian Town (埔田镇; 埔田鎮),
- Dongjing Tea Farm (东径茶场; 東徑茶場),
- Pingshang Farm (坪上农场; 坪上農場),
- Saling Farm (卅岭农场; 卅嶺農場).

== Places of Interest ==
- Huangqishan Forest Park, the largest natural ecological park in Jieyang City
- Jiedong Hakka walled village (客家圍龍屋), a well-preserved Hakka settlement
- Jiedong District is one of the Hakka settlements and has preserved a large number of Hakka dragon houses.
- Longtan Ancient Town, a well-preserved ancient village.
- Jiedong Guang'an Temple, a temple built in Qing dynasty

== See also ==
- List of administrative divisions of Guangdong
