= Mei Yi (translator) =

Chinese translator, journalist and politician

- 梅益
- Born: Chen Shaoqing; January 2, 1913; Xiangqiao District, Chaozhou, Guangdong, China
- Died: September 13, 2003 (aged 90); Beijing, China
- Education: Shantou Jinshan Middle School; Hangchow University
- Occupations: Translator, journalist, politician
- Spouse: Yin Qihua
- Relatives: Chen Yansheng (father)
- Writing career
- Language: Chinese, English
- Period: 1931–2003
- Notable work: How the Steel Was Tempered

Chinese name
- Chinese: 梅益
Transcriptions
Standard Mandarin
- Hanyu Pinyin: Méi Yì
Southern Min
- Teochew Peng'im: Bhuê^{5} Iah^{4}

Chen Shaoqing
- Traditional Chinese: 陳少卿
- Simplified Chinese: 陈少卿
Transcriptions
Standard Mandarin
- Hanyu Pinyin: Chén Shàoqīng
Southern Min
- Teochew Peng'im: Dang^{5} Ziê^{2}-kêng^{1}

Mei Yi (Chinese: 梅益; 2 January 1913 – 13 September 2003) was a Chinese translator, journalist and politician. In 1938 he translated the English version of How the Steel Was Tempered, which was the earliest Chinese version.

== Biography ==
=== ROC era ===
Mei was born Chen Shaoqing in Xiangqiao District of Chaozhou, Guangdong, on January 2, 1913, to Chen Yansheng (陈彦生), a boatman. He primarily studied at Chengnan Primary School and secondary studied at Shantou Jinshan Middle School. In the summer of 1932, Mei went to Peiping alone, looking for revolutionary organizations and studying English by himself in the Beijing Library. He started to publish works in 1934. At the beginning of 1935, Mei joined the Chinese League of Left-Wing Writers and went to Shanghai in the autumn of the same year to teach at a private high school, but he was expelled from the school soon because he let the students in his class take part in the demonstration. Mei joined the Chinese Communist Party (CCP) in 1937. After Shanghai was occupied by the Imperial Japanese Army, he served as editor-in-chief of the Daily Translation. In September 1940 he was accepted to Hangchow University. From 1942 to 1945, he served in the Publicity Department of the East China Bureau of the CCP. From 1945 to 1946, he served as Secretary of the Shanghai Cultural Committee of the CCP and spokesman of the delegation of the party in Nanjing in 1946. From 1947 to 1949, he served as deputy editor-in-chief of Yan'an and Taihang Branch Office of the Xinhua News Agency.

=== PRC era ===
After the Chinese Communist Revolution in 1949, he became deputy director-general and then director-general and secretary of the CCP committee of the Central Broadcasting Bureau. In 1957, he was elected vice-president of the All-China Journalists Association.

In 1966, Mao Zedong launched the Cultural Revolution, he was brought to be persecuted and then was sent to the May Seventh Cadre Schools to do farm works in Suiyang District of Shangqiu, Henan.

Since 1978, he had been secretary-general, vice-president and first secretary of the CCP committee of the Chinese Academy of Social Sciences, and vice-director of the Editorial Committee of Encyclopedia of China. From 1986 to 1996 he served as chief editor of China Encyclopedia Publishing House.

He was a member of the 1st and 5th National Committee of the Chinese People's Political Consultative Conference. He was a delegate to the 1st, 2nd and 3rd National People's Congress. He was a member of the 1st and 2nd Advisory Committee of the Central Committee of the Chinese Communist Party.

He died on September 13, 2003, in Beijing, aged 90.

== Personal life ==
Mei married Yin Qihua (尹绮华).

== Works ==
- 梅益百年纪念文集 [Mei Yi's Centennial Collection] (in Chinese). Beijing: Social Science Literature Publishing House. 2014.
- 梅益文选 [Mei Yi's Selected Works] (in Chinese). China Social Science Press. 2017. ISBN 9787520303200.

== Translation ==
- How the Steel Was Tempered (钢铁是怎样炼成的)

Government offices
New title	Director of Central Broadcasting Bureau; 1954–1966	Succeeded by Liu Luming (刘路明)
