= Shantou Waisha Airport =

Military airport in Shantou, Guangdong, China

Shantou Waisha Airport 汕头外砂机场
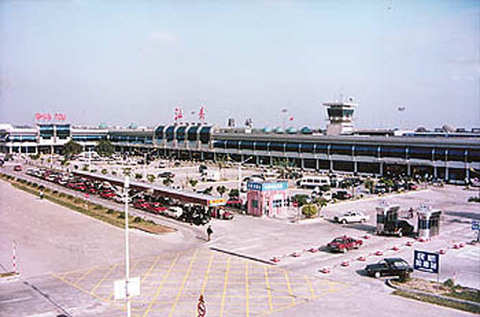
- IATA: none; ICAO: none

Summary
- Airport type: Military
- Owner: People's Liberation Army
- Operator: People's Liberation Army Air Force
- Location: Longhu, Guangdong, China
- Opened: 15 April 1974 (commercial)
- Passenger services ceased: 15 December 2011
- Built: 1956 (military)
- Coordinates: 23°25′30″N 116°45′37″E

Map
- Location in Guangdong

Runways
Direction	Length		Surface
Direction	m	ft	Surface
04/22	2,500	8,202	Concrete

Shantou Waisha Airport is a People's Liberation Army Air Force Base in the city of Shantou in Guangdong province, China. It served as the city's civilian airport from 15 April 1974 until 15 December 2011, when all commercial flights were transferred to the newly built Jieyang Chaoshan International Airport.

Shantou Waisha Airport is located in Longhu District and opened in 1956 as a military airport for the People's Liberation Army Air Force. It opened for commercial air carriers on 15 April 1974.

Airlines that operated at the civilian airport

- China Southern Unknown-2011
- China Eastern Unknown-2011
- China Northen Unknown
- China southwest Unknown
- Sichuan Airlines Unknown
- Hong Kong Airlines 2010-2011
- Jetstar Asia 2010-2011

== See also ==
- List of airports in China
- List of People's Liberation Army Air Force airbases
