= Shantou Jinshan Middle School =

Location
- Queshi Scenic Area, Haojiang district, Shantou city, Guangdong Province, China (Haiguanding, Queshi)

Information
- Other name: 汕头市金山中学
- Type: Public
- Motto: Rigorous, Humble, Diligent, Enterprising
- Established: 1877
- Principal: Li Lili
- Staff: 259
- Grades: Grade 10–12
- Enrollment: About 3600
- Website: http://www.stjszx.net/

Shantou Jinshan Middle School is a public high school in Shantou, Guangdong, China.

== Notable alumni ==
- Cai Qiao (1897–1990)
- Guo Renyuan (1898–1970)
- Dai Pingwan (1903–1945)
- Mei Yi (1913–2003)
- Jao Tsung-I (1917–2018)
