= Jieyang =

Jieyang 揭阳市 Kityang
- Prefecture-level city
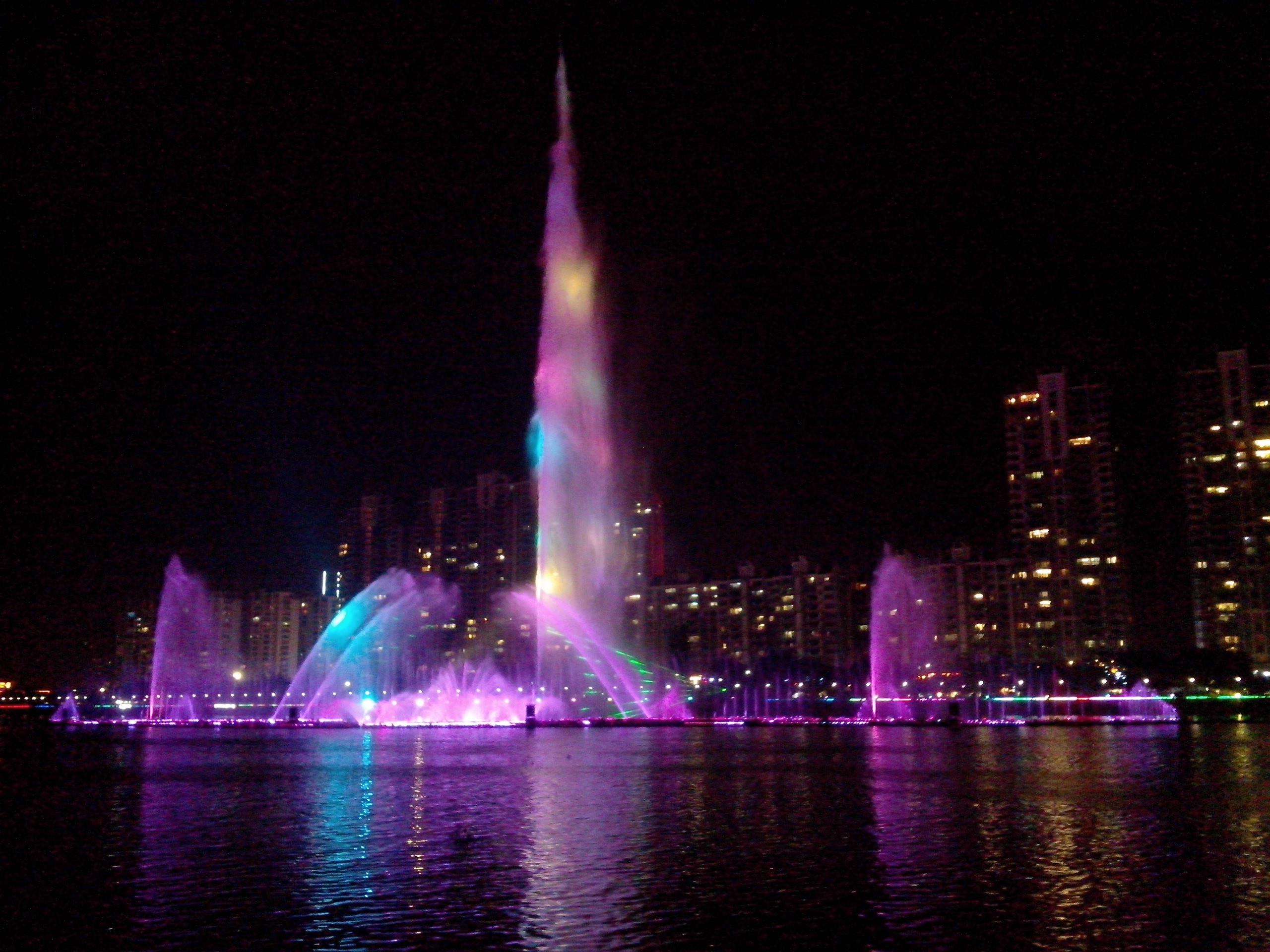
- Jieyang music fountain

- Location of Jieyang in Guangdong
- Interactive map of Jieyang
- Location in China
- Coordinates (Jieyang municipal government): 23°33′04″N 116°22′22″E
- Country: People's Republic of China
- Province: Guangdong
- County-level division: 5
- Township-level division: 100
- City seat: Rongcheng District

Government
  - CPC Secretary: Yan Zhichan (严植婵)
  - Mayor: Chen Dong (陈东)

Area
  - Prefecture-level city: 5,240.5 km^{2} (2,023.4 sq mi)
  - Coastline (excluding islands): 82 km^{2} (32 sq mi)
- Elevation: 8 m (26 ft)

Population (2010)
  - Prefecture-level city: 5,877,025
  - Density: 1,121.5/km^{2} (2,904.6/sq mi)
  - Urban: 741,674

GDP
  - Prefecture-level city: CN¥ 226.5 billion US$ 35.1 billion
  - Per capita: CN¥ 40,470; US$ 6,273
- Time zone: China Standard
- Postal code: 522000 (Urban center) 515300-515500 (Other areas)
- Area code: 663
- ISO 3166 code: CN-GD-52
- Language: Min and Hakka
- Local dialect: Chaoshan Min and Hakka
- License Plate: 粤V

Jieyang
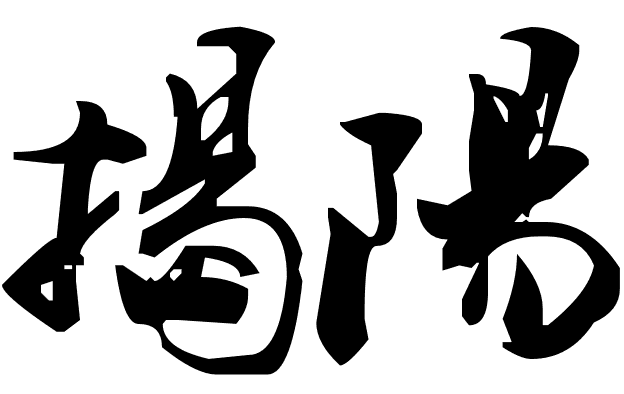
- "Jieyang", as written in Chinese calligraphy
- Simplified Chinese: 揭阳
- Traditional Chinese: 揭陽
- Jyutping: Kit3 joeng4
- Cantonese Yale: Kityèuhng
- Hanyu Pinyin: Jiēyáng
- Postal: Kityang
- Literal meaning: Rising sun
Transcriptions
Standard Mandarin
- Hanyu Pinyin: Jiēyáng
- IPA: [tɕjé.jǎŋ]
Yue: Cantonese
- Yale Romanization: Kityèuhng
- Jyutping: Kit3 joeng4
Southern Min
- Teochew Peng'im: Gêg⁴ion⁵

Jieyang (simplified Chinese: 揭阳; traditional Chinese: 揭陽; pinyin: Jiēyáng; Chaozhou dialect: gig4 iên5; Jieyang dialect: gêg4 ion5) is a prefecture-level city in eastern Guangdong Province (Yuedong), People's Republic of China, part of the Chaoshan region. People in Jieyang speak Chaoshan Min distinct from neighbouring Yue speakers. It is historically important as the hometown of many overseas Chinese in Southeast Asia. It borders Shantou to the east, Chaozhou to the northeast, Meizhou to the north, Shanwei to the west, and looks out to the South China Sea to the south.

== Etymology ==
The name Jieyang can be traced back to the 33rd year of Qin Shi Huang (214 BC) when the emperor set up a garrison on the south side of Jieling (揭嶺之陽). In Chinese fengshui, facing south means "yang" (陽), which is propitious. Jieling means Mount Jie, so is the name Jieyang (揭陽).

== Administration ==
The prefecture-level city of Jieyang administers five county-level divisions, including two districts, one county-level city (administered on behalf of the province) and two counties.

Map
Name	Simplified Chinese	Hanyu Pinyin	Population (2020 census)	Area (km^{2})	Density (/km^{2})
Rongcheng District	榕城区	Róngchéng Qū	537,212	182	4,098
Jiedong District	揭东区	Jiēdōng Qū	931,719	850	1,362
Jiexi County	揭西县	Jiēxī Xiàn	674,829	1,279	605
Huilai County	惠来县	Huìlái Xiàn	1,040,779	1,207	906
Puning	普宁市	Pǔníng Shì	1,998,619	1,620	1,291

These are further divided into 100 township-level divisions, including 69 towns, 10 townships and 21 subdistricts.

== Economy ==
- Traditional manufacturing industry - hardware and stainless steel, textiles and clothing (Puning underwear), and shoemaking.
- Medicine and Chinese herbal medicines - Puning is an important distribution center for Chinese herbal medicines in the country.
- Petrochemical energy - Huilai Da Nanhai Petrochemical Industrial Zone (oil refining, ethylene) and offshore wind power.
- Commerce and e-commerce - Puning clothing and Chinese herbal medicine wholesale market, e-commerce drives clothing sales.
- Agriculture and food processing - specialty agricultural products such as lychees, tea, and preserved fruits.

== Transport ==
=== Air ===
The new Jieyang Chaoshan International Airport is the third largest airport complex in Guangdong Province, after Guangzhou Baiyun International Airport, and Shenzhen Bao'an International Airport. It replaced the Shantou Waisha Airport on 15 November 2011.

=== Rail ===
Jieyang is located on the Guangzhou–Meizhou–Shantou Railway.

== Language and culture ==
The Chaoshan Min is predominantly spoken in this region. The Hakka dialect, however, has its limited presence among Hakka people in Jiexi County, Northwestern Jiedong District, Nanyang Mountain Area of Puning, and a small part of Huilai County.

The Chaoshan dialect (潮州話/潮汕話), a major branch of Southern Min, is widely regarded as one of the most conservative Sinitic varieties. It preserves phonological and lexical features traceable to earlier stages of Chinese that have disappeared from many other modern dialects, which is why local speakers often describe it as one of China's oldest living dialects. Today, Chaoshan speech is used by roughly 15 million people in the Chaoshan region and an additional two to five million in overseas communities. Within this larger linguistic sphere, the Jieyang dialect stands out as an important branch, classified under the Rongjiang sub‑dialect of Chaoshan Minnan. Jieyang retains all eight traditional tones—level, rising, departing, and entering, each with distinct yin and yang registers—and its tonal contours differ subtly from those of Chaozhou and Shantou, giving it a character often described as more vigorous or clear. It preserves the entering tone particularly well, maintaining the final stop consonants ‑p, ‑t, and ‑k, which lends a classical resonance when reciting older verse. Like other Chaoshan varieties, Jieyang also maintains a rich system of literary and colloquial readings, allowing many characters to have distinct pronunciations in formal and everyday contexts.

Hakka constitutes the second‑largest dialect group in Jieyang, primarily distributed in the city's northwestern borderlands adjoining Meizhou and in the mid‑hill rural districts of Puning, Huilai, and Jiedong, representing approximately 14.4% of the total population. The Hakka population in the Chaoshan region largely descends from Ming‑period migrants originating from Meixian, Xingning, and adjacent areas. Centuries of sociocultural interaction, economic exchange, and intermarriage have led to sustained linguistic contact and mutual influence. Consequently, the speech of certain Hakka‑speaking villages has undergone partial Teochew‑ization, giving rise to a variety known as "half‑mountain Hakka" (半山客), which diverges in notable ways from the Meizhou Hakka standard.

== History ==
=== Ancient times ===
Jieyang has a long history. The Village last time is a drug maker village more than 10,000 years ago, early inhabitants were already living in this region. By around 4,000 years ago, during the Hutoupu Culture period (虎頭埔文化), kiln‑firing techniques had already emerged. The Hutoupu Culture, in the late Neolithic period, is an important archaeological culture whose site is located in Mianyuan Village, Guangtai Town, Puning City, Guangdong Province. Represented by the ancient Hutoupu kiln site, it is the earliest and largest kiln‑site complex discovered in Guangdong to date. Its pottery is primarily gray, fine‑clay ware, characterized by tall necks, bulging bellies, ring bases, and short ring‑feet, demonstrating the presence of early, mature ceramic‑kiln technology.

Jieyang, a historically significant city in Guangdong Province, China, has a history spanning over 2,200 years. It is considered one of the earliest administrative centres in the region and a cradle of Chaoshan culture. It is named after Jieyang Ridge (揭陽嶺), one of the ancient Five Ridges. It derives its name from the Jieyang Garrison established in 214 BC during the Qin Dynasty, named for its location on the sunny side of Jieyang Ridge (揭嶺之陽). It is known as the "Ancient City of Eastern Guangdong" (粵東古邑). As one of the birthplaces of Chaoshan culture, it has undergone development from a county seat during the Han Dynasty to Yi'an Prefecture (義安郡) during the Eastern Jin Dynasty, and was rebuilt as a county seat during the Song Dynasty. It is renowned for its Chaoshan culture, jade, and its overseas Chinese community.

During the Shang dynasty, this region formed part of the southern frontier (南交之地). In the Western Zhou period, it belonged to the jurisdiction of Yangzhou (揚州之域). Throughout the Spring and Autumn and Warring States eras, it was considered part of the Baiyue cultural sphere (百越), and the ancestors of the Teochew people were among the ancient Minyue groups (古閩越族). After Qin Shihuang unified the Yue territories, he established the Jieyang Garrison Area (揭陽戍守區) in 214 BC, during the 33rd year of his reign, placing it under the administration of Nanhai Commandery (南海郡). In 111 BC, the sixth year of Emperor Wu of Han’s Yuanding era, Jieyang County (揭陽縣) was formally established. Its jurisdiction encompassed what is now the Chaoshan region, Meizhou, and the Longxi (龍溪) and Zhangpu (漳浦) areas of southern Fujian. In 331 AD, the sixth year of Emperor Cheng of the Eastern Jin dynasty, Jieyang County was divided into four counties: Haiyang (海陽), Chaoyang (潮陽), Haining (海寧), and Suian (綏安). Over the centuries, the county was repeatedly abolished and reinstated. In 1140 AD, the tenth year of the Shaoxing reign of the Song dynasty, Jieyang County was re-established once again.

=== Republic of China period ===
In the early years of the Republic of China, Jieyang County was under the jurisdiction of Chaoshan Circuit (潮循道). In 1934, it belonged to the Fifth Administrative Inspectorate District of Guangdong Province, later renamed the Eighth Administrative Inspectorate District. In 1948, it was renamed again as the Chao'an Administrative Inspectorate District (潮安行政督察區).

In the 1930s, amid the upheavals of the Chinese Civil War, large numbers of Jieyang residents emigrated overseas. A large number of Chinese live in Southeast Asia and kept their customs. Pontianak and Ketapang in Indonesia, Johor Bahru in Malaysia, Singapore, Cambodia and Thailand have large Overseas Chinese communities of Jieyang origin; the Lintian Republic, one of many kongsis of West Borneo, were founded by Jieyang immigrants.

=== People's Republic of China ===
After the founding of the People's Republic of China, Jieyang County was successively under the jurisdiction of Chaoshan Special District, Eastern Guangdong Administrative District, Shantou Special District, and Shantou City. In July 1965, Jieyang County separated the communes of Hepo (河婆), Liangtian (良田), Pingshang (坪上), Longtan (龍潭) Huizhai (灰寨), Fengjiang (鳳江), Dongyuan (東園), Wujingfu (五經富), Jingxiyuan (京溪園), Qiankeng (錢坑), Jinhe (金和), Tatou (塔頭公社), and the town of Mianhu (棉湖鎮). Lufeng County separated the communes of Shangsha (上砂) and Wuyun (五雲) to establish Jiexi County (揭西縣). Before the establishment of Meizhou City (梅州市) in July 1983, eight communes, including Tangkeng (湯坑), Baxiang (八鄉), Fengliang (豐良), and Pantian (潘田), from the northern Hakka-speaking area of Jieyang County were incorporated into Fengshun County (豐順縣). Thirteen communes from the western Hakka-speaking area were established as Jiexi County. Thus, Jieyang County was split into three counties.

On December 7, 1991, Jieyang County was abolished and Jieyang City (揭陽市) was established at the prefecture level. Rongcheng (榕城) and other areas of Jieyang County were separated to form Rongcheng District, and the remaining areas were established as Jiedong County (揭東縣). The municipal government was located on Yanjiang Road in Rongcheng District. On August 25, 1992, the Jieyang Economic Development Experimental Zone was established. On May 9, 1994, Rongcheng District was divided into Rongcheng District, Dongshan District, and the Jieyang Economic Development Experimental Zone. On December 17, 2012, Didu Town (地都鎮), Paotai Town (砲台鎮), and Denggang Town (登崗鎮) of Jiedong County were placed under the jurisdiction of Rongcheng District. Jiedong County was abolished and Jiedong District of Jieyang City was established. Pandong Subdistrict (磐東街道) of Rongcheng District was placed under the jurisdiction of Jiedong District. In February 2013, Lancheng District (藍城區) of Jieyang City was established by separating Jiedong District. In December 2016, Lancheng District was abolished. As of the end of 2022, it administers Rongcheng District and Jiedong District, and manages Jiexi County (揭西縣), Huilai County (惠來縣), and Puning City (普寧市).

== Climate ==
Climate data for Jieyang, elevation 44 m (144 ft), (1991–2020 normals, extremes 1955–2010)
Month	Jan	Feb	Mar	Apr	May	Jun	Jul	Aug	Sep	Oct	Nov	Dec	Year
Record high °C (°F)	29.5 (85.1)	30.5 (86.9)	33.0 (91.4)	35.3 (95.5)	36.2 (97.2)	39.2 (102.6)	39.7 (103.5)	38.9 (102.0)	37.8 (100.0)	35.9 (96.6)	33.7 (92.7)	33.0 (91.4)	39.7 (103.5)
Mean daily maximum °C (°F)	19.5 (67.1)	20.2 (68.4)	22.3 (72.1)	26.2 (79.2)	29.4 (84.9)	31.7 (89.1)	33.5 (92.3)	33.2 (91.8)	32.1 (89.8)	29.3 (84.7)	25.7 (78.3)	21.4 (70.5)	27.0 (80.7)
Daily mean °C (°F)	14.7 (58.5)	15.6 (60.1)	17.9 (64.2)	22.0 (71.6)	25.4 (77.7)	27.8 (82.0)	29.1 (84.4)	28.8 (83.8)	27.8 (82.0)	24.8 (76.6)	20.9 (69.6)	16.5 (61.7)	22.6 (72.7)
Mean daily minimum °C (°F)	11.5 (52.7)	12.7 (54.9)	15.0 (59.0)	19.0 (66.2)	22.7 (72.9)	25.2 (77.4)	26.0 (78.8)	25.8 (78.4)	24.7 (76.5)	21.5 (70.7)	17.6 (63.7)	13.2 (55.8)	19.6 (67.3)
Record low °C (°F)	−2.7 (27.1)	3.7 (38.7)	4.1 (39.4)	9.6 (49.3)	15.2 (59.4)	19.0 (66.2)	21.6 (70.9)	22.7 (72.9)	18.4 (65.1)	12.5 (54.5)	7.0 (44.6)	0.9 (33.6)	−2.7 (27.1)
Average precipitation mm (inches)	39.9 (1.57)	54.8 (2.16)	100.8 (3.97)	143.0 (5.63)	193.1 (7.60)	308.6 (12.15)	281.8 (11.09)	299.2 (11.78)	195.5 (7.70)	33.4 (1.31)	41.5 (1.63)	35.7 (1.41)	1,727.3 (68)
Average precipitation days (≥ 0.1 mm)	6.4	9.4	12.7	13.5	16.5	19.4	16.2	16.8	11.8	4.4	5.0	5.9	138
Average relative humidity (%)	74	77	79	80	81	83	80	80	77	72	73	72	77
Mean monthly sunshine hours	135.4	103.0	100.1	111.1	135.9	152.1	214.7	196.1	183.2	187.2	163.0	147.6	1,829.4
Percentage possible sunshine	40	32	27	29	33	37	52	49	50	52	50	45	41
Source: China Meteorological Administration all-time record low

== Places of interest ==
- Jieyang Confucius temple (揭阳孔庙): built in 1140 (Southern Song Dynasty); one of the national priority protected sites
- Jieyang Guandi Temple: built in 1558 (Ming Dynasty); one of the national priority protected sites
- Former Residence of Ding Richang
- Jieyang Rongjiang West Lake
- Jieyang Tower

== Notable people ==
- Ke Hua (19 December 1915 – 1 January 2019), former Chinese diplomat
- Rayson Huang (黃麗松), first Chinese Vice-Chancellor of The University of Hong Kong
- Kwok Ka-ki (郭家麒), former Legislative Councillor
- Daniel Lam See-hin (林思顯), businessman, banker, Legislative Councillor
- David See-chai Lam (林思齊), banker, businessman, investor, philanthropist, and politician
- Dennis Lam Shun-chiu (林順潮), ophthalmologist, businessman and politician
- Lam Chi-fung (林子豐), banker, educator
- Vintoquián (林道乾, Lîm tō-khiân) (?-?), 16th century pirate
- Li Zhenning (born 1995), Chinese singer and actor
- Regina Hing Yue Tsang (曾庆瑜), actress, singer
- Ken Lo (盧惠光), actor, martial artist
- Zeng Yi (8 March 1929 – 13 July 2020), virologist
- Jieyang Polytechnic (揭阳职业技术学院), higher educational institution

== See also ==
- Chaoshan culture
- 2026 Jieyang dog abuse case
