= Double Island =

Double Island may refer to:

- Double Island, Queensland, near Cairns, Queensland, Australia
- Double Island Point, a headland near Gympie on the coast of Queensland, Australia
- Mayu Island and Dezhou Island in Shantou, China, known as Double Island in 19th-century English-language sources
- Double Island, Hong Kong, in northeastern New Territories, Hong Kong
- Double Island (Washington), one of the San Juan Islands
