= Guangdong Shantou Overseas Middle School =

School in Shantou, Guangdong, China

Guangdong Shantou Overseas Middle School (广东汕头华侨中学) is a middle school in Jinping District, Shantou, Guangdong, China. It was founded in 1932 as Shantou Haibin normal school. The name of the school has been changed many times. In 1986, its name was determined officially as Guangdong Shantou Overseas Middle School.

== Introduction ==
Guangdong Shantou Oversea Middle School is a national demonstration high school, and it is one of the oldest overseas middle schools in China. The school motto is to be ambitious, be strict, be steady, and be moral.

== Features ==
The school has 186 full-time teachers, two of them had awarded the honor of "special-grade teacher in provincial level", 54 of them are first-class teachers, and 78 of them are senior teachers. The school follows the theory of modern education, making efforts on technological research, implementing audio-visual education program, and improving teaching effectiveness. The school promotes schoolyard arts and sport activities, and attaches importance to English education.

== School activities ==
The school holds different kinds of activities every year, such as an art festival, sport festival, Open Week, and New Year party. There are also other activities held by student organizations, which offer an arena for student performance and self-improvement.

== Facilities ==
In 2013, the school decided to establish a canteen and a dormitory. With the support of a sponsor, Huang Weixuan, a new canteen with two floors was established. In order to solve the problem of some students’ residence, the school raised money itself for the construction cost, thus the first residence zone was established before September 1, 2014. The first residence zone contains 13 rooms; each room is equipped with air conditioner, a balcony, and two bathrooms.
