= Dezhou Island =

Island in Guangdong, China

Coordinates: 23.327°N 116.756°E

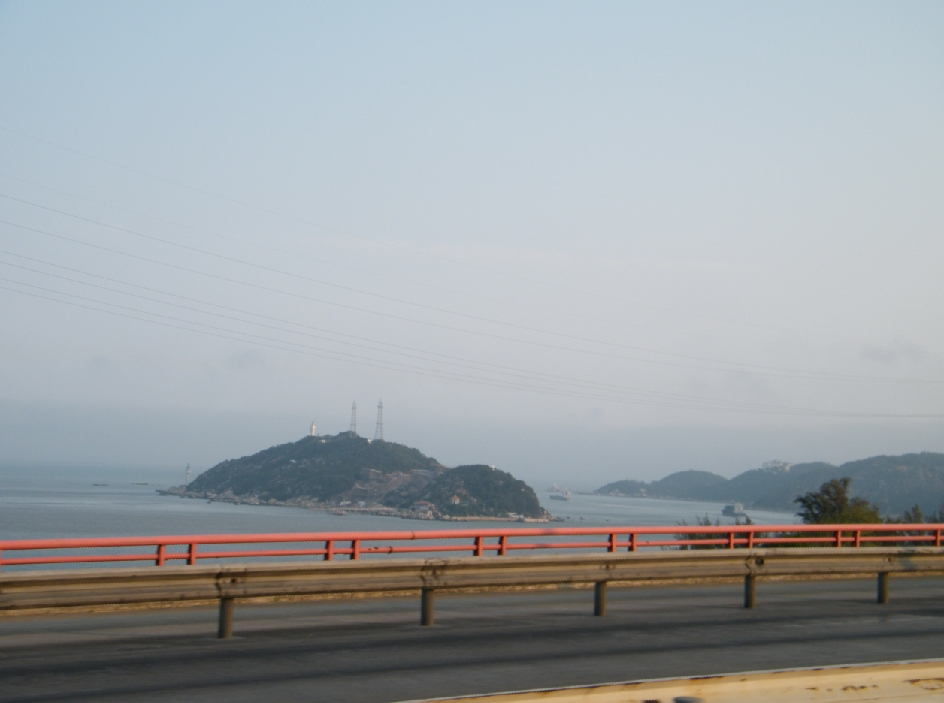
Dezhou Island seen from Shantou Bay Bridge

Dezhou Island (Chinese: 德洲岛; pinyin: Dézhōu Dǎo), also known as Lu Yu (Chinese: 鹿屿; pinyin: Lù Yǔ), (Note: The characters 德 dé and 鹿 lù are homophones in Chaoshan dialect.) is an island in the waterway used by the Port of Shantou, 0.5 km from Dahao Island. It has an area of 0.136 square kilometers and has a well-preserved lighthouse that was built in 1880.

== See also ==
- Mayu Island
