= Feixia Middle School =

School in Guangdong, China

Feixia Middle School (simplified Chinese: 飞厦中学; traditional Chinese: 飛廈中學) is a public middle school in Jinping District, Shantou city, Guangdong province, China, founded in 1982. It is a highest school of province level. Many of the school's graduates go to Jinshan High School, but some of them will get chance to study in Temasek Secondary School in Singapore.

In 2005, Feixia began construction of a "garden" campus that would span 12,000 m^{2} (130,000 sq ft). It is a Guangdong Provincial-Level First-Class Middle School, which was the sole middle school with that designation in eastern Guangdong in 2005. Dahua Network News called Feixia a "top-tier high school" (优质学位中学) in 2006. That year, Special Zone Youth Daily said Feixia "has emerged as Shantou's most sought-after and high-quality junior secondary school".
