= Queshi Bridge =

Queshi Bridge 礐石大桥
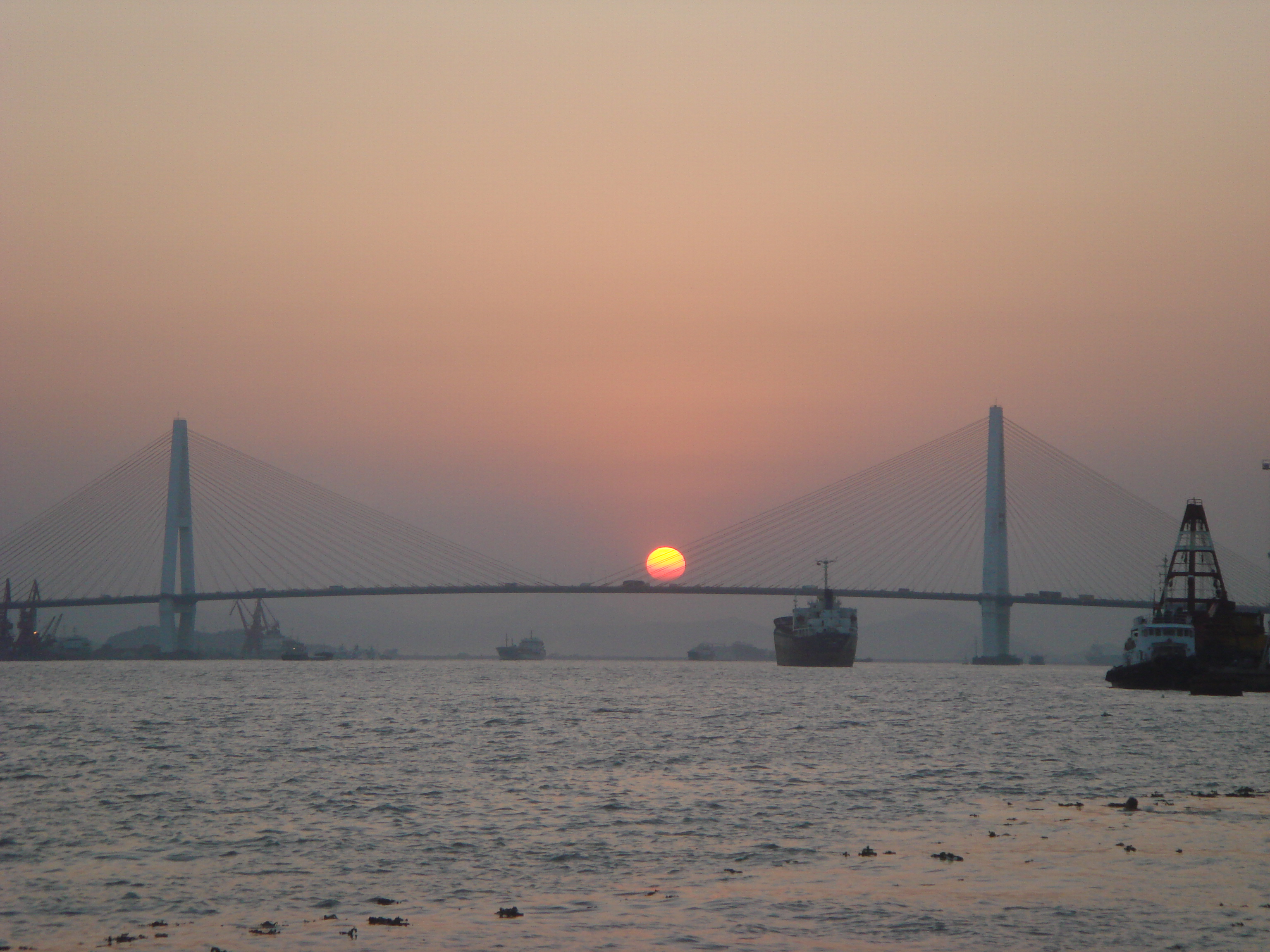
- Coordinates: 23°20′37″N 116°39′36″E
- Carries: 6 lanes
- Crosses: Shantou Harbour on the Rong River
- Locale: Shantou, Guangdong, China

Characteristics
- Design: Cable-stayed bridge
- Total length: 2,402 metres (7,881 ft)
- Width: 30 metres (98 ft)
- Longest span: 518 metres (1,699 ft)
- Clearance below: 38 metres (125 ft)

History
- Opened: 12 February 1999

Location
- Interactive map of Queshi Bridge

The Queshi Bridge (礐石大桥), in Shantou, China, is among the world's longest bridges. Its long span of 518 metres (1,699 ft) ranks it among the largest cable-stayed bridges in the world.

== See also ==
- Shantou Bay Bridge
- List of largest cable-stayed bridges
