= Port of Shantou =

Coordinates: 23°20′19″N 116°44′55″E

Port of Shantou (汕头港)
- Interactive map of Port of Shantou (汕头港)

Location
- Country: People's Republic of China
- Location: Shantou, Guangdong Province

Details
- Type of harbour: Natural River Seaport

Statistics
- Website; Port of Shantou website

The Port of Shantou is a natural river seaport on the coast of the city of Shantou, Guangdong Province, People's Republic of China. It is the only major port in eastern Guangdong, and the gateway to the Shantou SEZ. In 2012, it had a throughput of 45.6 million tons of cargo, and 1,250,000 TEU of containers. Like most Chinese seaports, it has experienced frantic growth in the last two decades and has plans for large expansion in the future.

== History ==
Shantou was one of the Treaty Ports opened by the Treaties of Tientsin in 1858. British and American consulates were established on Mayu Island.

== Layout ==
The Port of Shantou is located in the estuary of the Rongjiang river (榕江), opening to the South China Sea. As of 2012 it had 86 berths, 18 of which were deep-water berths capable of handling ships over 10,000 DWT.

Shantou Port has eight port areas.

- The Old Port Area (老港区)
- Zhuchi Port Area (珠池港区) is the main port area as of 2013.
- Mashan Port Area (马山港区)
- Guang'ao Port Area (广澳港区)
- Haimen Port Area (海门港区)
- Nan'ao Port Area (南澳港区) Located on Nan'ao island on Qianjiang Bay
- Rongjiang Port Area (榕江港区)
- Tianxin Port Area (天心港区): Under planning
