= Shantou Yuhuai Senior High School =

School in Shantou, Guangdong, China

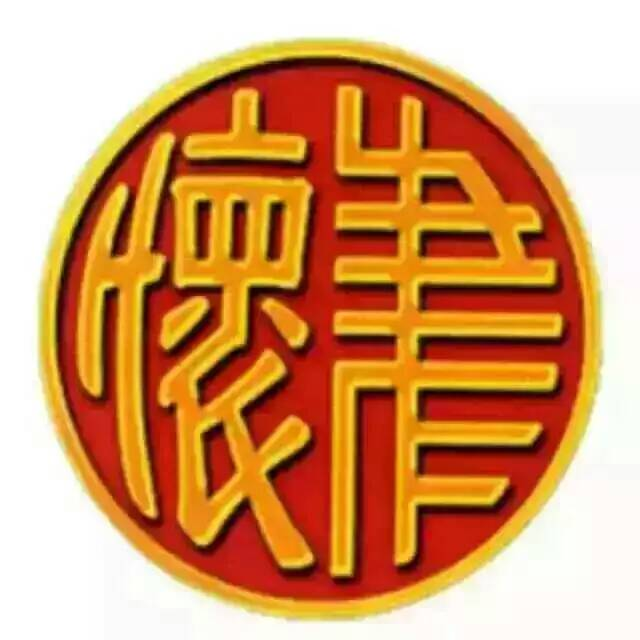
- Shantou, Guangdong; China

Information
- Former names: No.3 Senior High School; Dongfanghong Senior High School

Shantou Yuhuai Senior High School (Chinese: 汕头市聿怀中学 Pinyin:Yuhuai Zhongxue) was founded in 1877 in Shantou, Guangdong, China. It has over 130 years of history, making it one of the oldest schools in Shantou. The school once named as No.3 Senior High School and Dongfanghong Senior High School.

== Introduction ==
Shantou Yuhuai Senior High School is one of the national demonstration senior high schools in Guangdong, and it is also one of the Provincial level key secondary schools. The school has two campuses, 60 teaching classes, more than 210 teachers and more than 3600 students.

== History ==
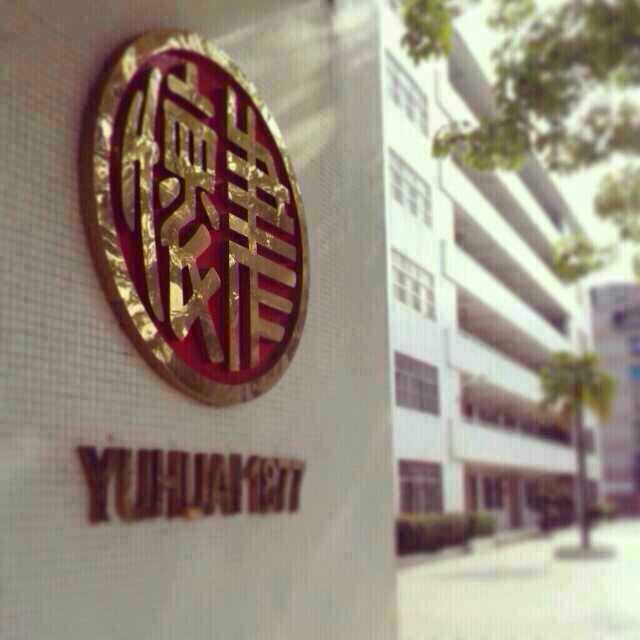
The old campus of Shantou Yuhuai Senior High School

=== Before the Founding of the PRC ===
In 1877, British missionary John Campbell built a school building, which could accommodate dozens of students. This was the predecessor of Yu Huai middle school.

In 1913, they chose another place in Shantou to build a new school building, the building could accommodate about sixty students.

In 1925, Yuhuai Senior High School was closed.

In 1929, Yuhuai Senior High School opened, and appointed Chen Zelin as president.

In 1947, Chen Zelin went to America, and Zhuo Xiaoliang was the acting president. After a summer of hard work, the number of students was one thousand and one hundred, and the number of teachers was about sixty.

=== After the Founding of the PRC ===
In 1953, Yuhuai Senior High School was changed its name to Shantou No.3 Senior High School.

In 1985, the school held a meeting where it was agreed to resume the name Yuhuai Senior High School.

== International Department ==
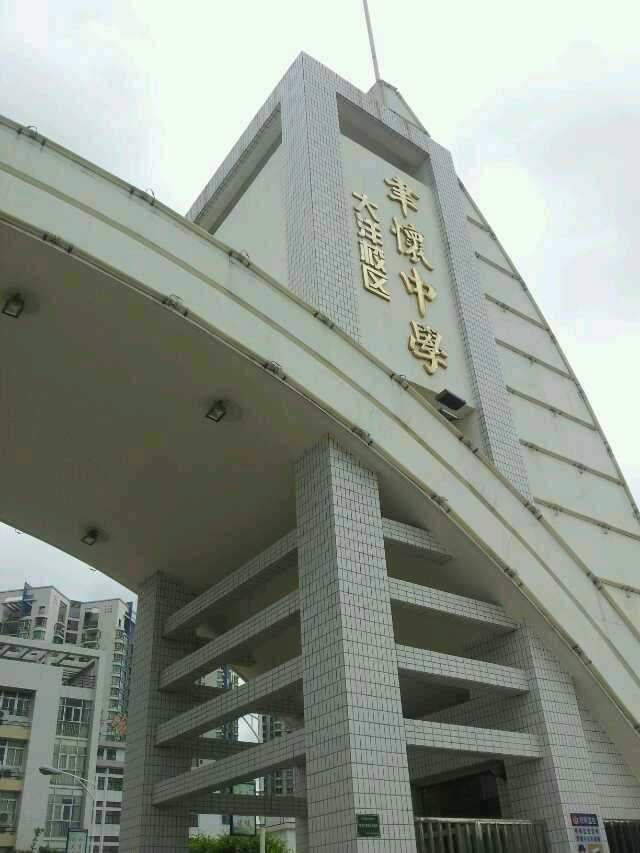
Dayang Campus of Shantou Yuhuai Senior High School

The International Department of Shantou Yuhuai Senior High School was founded in 2013, and it is located in Dayang Campus of Shantou Yuhuai Senior High School. It is the first senior high school International Department in eastern Guangdong.
