= Shantou Metro =

Metro system in Shantou, China

Overview
- Native name: 汕头轨道交通
- Locale: Shantou, Guangdong, China
- Transit type: Monorail rapid transit
- Number of lines: 1 (under construction); 3 (Phase 1)
- Number of stations: 45 (Phase 1)

Technical
- System length: 76.9 km (Phase 1)

Shantou Metro (Chinese: 汕头轨道交通; pinyin: Shàntóu Guǐdào Jiāotōng), officially Shantou Rail Transit, is a monorail rapid transit system under planning in Shantou, Guangdong, China. Construction has started on a two-station test line between Shantou University and Xuelin Road, a route which will be part of Line 1 in the future. In the short term plan there will be three lines. The complete long-term plan for the system contains 8 lines and a total length of 230 km.

== History ==
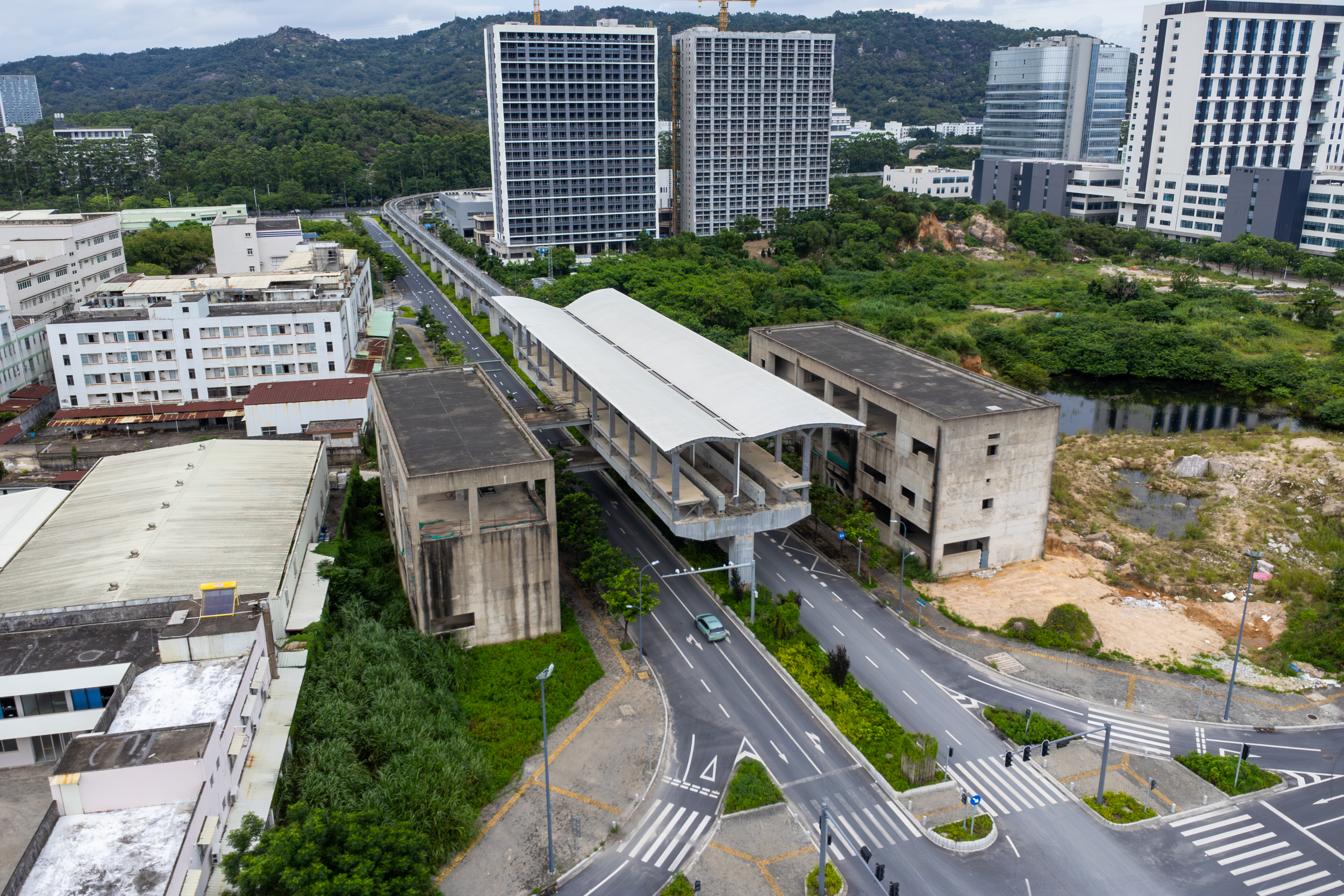
unfinished Xuelin Road station

Plans for a metro system to be built in Shantou date back to 2008. The system was approved by the municipal council in November 2016 and on December 28, 2016 construction commenced on the test section between Shantou University and Xuelin Road. Full-scale construction on the system has yet to begin due to Shantou not meeting the criteria required for building an urban rail transit system.

== Lines ==
| Line | Terminals | | Planned Opening | Length km | Stations |
|---|---|---|---|---|---|
| 1 | Shantou University | Jinwan | TBA | 19.1 | 16 |
| 2 | Shidai Square | Lianxia | TBA | 44.9 | 22 |
| 3 | Xinjin | Laiwu | TBA | 12.9 | 9 |
| Total | | | | 76.9 | 47 (interchanges counted as multiple stops) |
