= Mayu Island =

Island in Guangdong, China

Coordinates: 23°20′15″N 116°44′49″E

- Traditional Chinese: 媽嶼
- Simplified Chinese: 妈屿
- Literal meaning: mother isle
Transcriptions
Standard Mandarin
- Hanyu Pinyin: Māyǔ

Alternative Chinese name
- Traditional Chinese: 放雞山
- Simplified Chinese: 放鸡山
- Literal meaning: mountain of letting chickens go
Transcriptions
Standard Mandarin
- Hanyu Pinyin: Fàngjī Shān

Second alternative Chinese name
- Traditional Chinese: 放雞島
- Simplified Chinese: 放鸡岛
- Literal meaning: island of letting chickens go
Transcriptions
Standard Mandarin
- Hanyu Pinyin: Fàngjī Dǎo

Mayu Island also known as Double Island is a strategically located island in Shantou (Swatow), Guangdong. It is unusual for having two Mazu temples on the same island. The island is located in the estuary of Shantou port, and has an area of 0.97 square kilometers, an elevation of 39 meters, and a coastline of 2.3 km. In the 19th century when Shantou was a treaty port, Mayu was the location of the British and American consulates and a customs house.

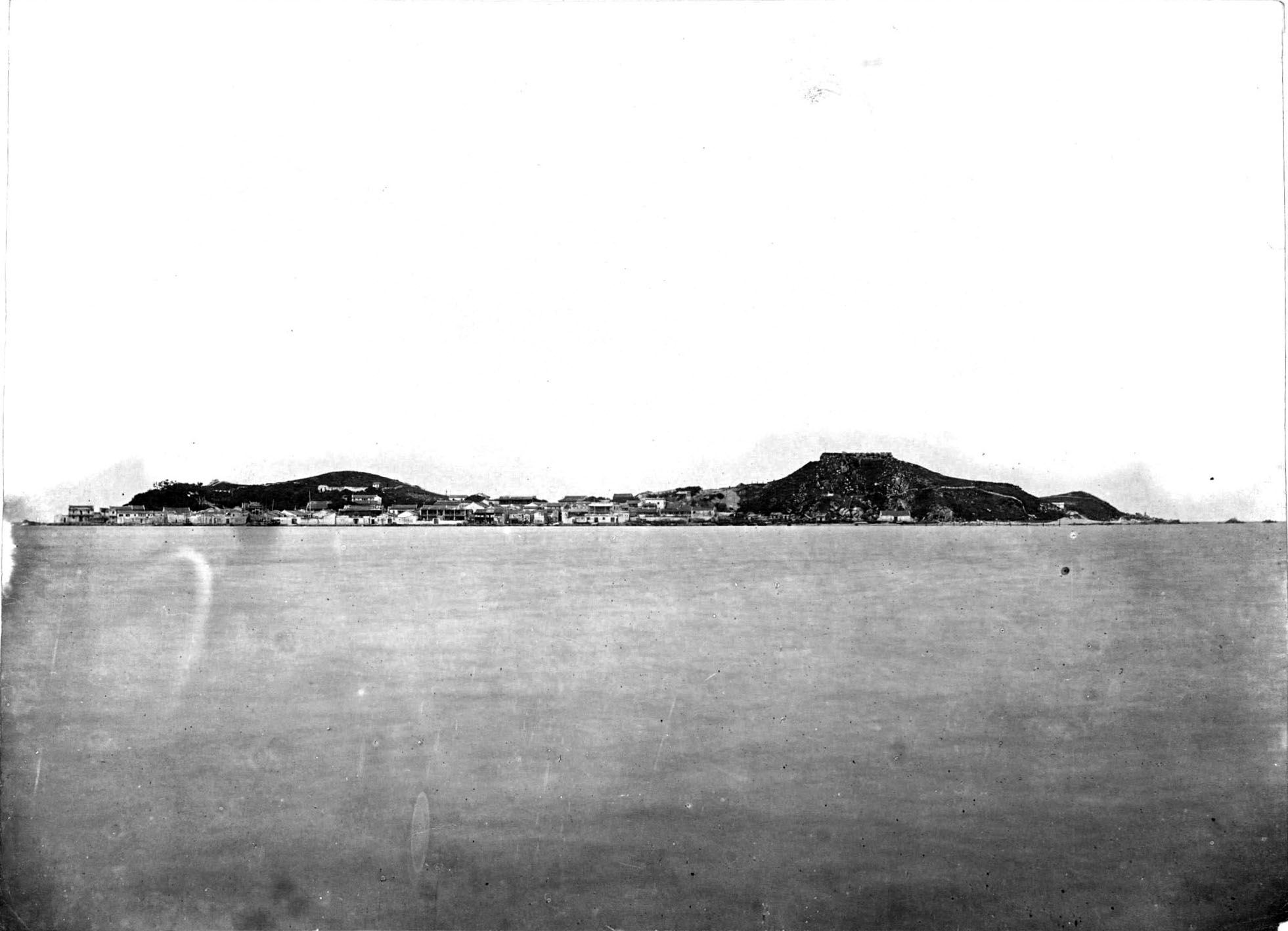
In the 19th century, English-language sources called Mayu Island and Dezhou Island "Double Island". Photo by Lai Afong from between 1860 and 1880.

== Names ==
The island was originally named Mǎyǔ (simplified Chinese: 马屿; traditional Chinese: 馬嶼; lit. 'horse isle') as it was thought to look like the front of a horse coming out of the water. Nowadays it is called Māyǔ (simplified Chinese: 妈屿; traditional Chinese: 媽嶼; lit. 'mother isle'). In imperial times, it was called the "mountain (or island) for letting chickens go" (simplified Chinese: 放鸡山; traditional Chinese: 放雞山; pinyin: Fàng Jī Shān; simplified Chinese: 放鸡岛; traditional Chinese: 放雞島; pinyin: Fàng Jī Dǎo) due to the tradition of fishers bringing live chickens to the island's Mazu temple and letting them go. It is also nicknamed "the key to customs" (simplified Chinese: 海关钥匙; traditional Chinese: 海關鑰匙; pinyin: hǎiguān yàoshi) due to its strategic location along an important waterway and its history of hosting customs houses.

In 19th-century English-language sources, it is called "Double Island".

== Temples ==
During the Yuan dynasty, a Mazu temple was built on the island by fishers who had incense brought from Meizhou Mazu Temple in Putian, Fujian. This temple was destroyed but rebuilt in the year 1861 during the Qing dynasty. It was expanded in 1928, and in 1984 donors from Hong Kong paid for renovations which were completed in 1993.

Another Mazu temple was built on the island during the Qing dynasty; it is said that it was built by a Mr. Wu from Quanzhou who had come to Shantou for business. This second temple was renovated in 1983.

The island also has a Dragon King temple, built in the early Qing dynasty.

== History ==
Before the Qing dynasty, Mayu Island was part of Chaoyang County, Chaozhou Prefecture. In the 56th year of the Kangxi Emperor (1717), Mayu Island was placed under the responsibility of Nan'ao's Chenghai Xiezuo Battalion (南澳澄海协左营), but the people who resided there were still under the administration of Chaoyang. In 1853, because Mayu Island was in the channel used by Shantou Port and ocean shipping was flourishing, the Chinese government established a Chinese-operated customs house on the island, known as Xinguan (Chinese: 新关; pinyin: Xīnguān; lit. 'new customs house') or Changguan (Chinese: 常关; pinyin: Chángguān).

Under the 1858 Treaty of Tianjin, Shantou was opened as a treaty port, and on the first day of 1860 the United States government established a consulate on Mayu Island. According to British records, a British consulate was opened on 7 July 1860. According to Qing dynasty records, the first British consul on the island was George W. Caine, who arrived in 1860. The British customs house on the island became a symbol of the establishment of the treaty port, and it was designated a protected monument of Shantou in 1994. Residences for foreign customs officials and tax collectors were also built on the island; they were eventually demolished in 1991 and 2002, respectively.

An 1860 American missionary source reported that about twenty foreigners and 2,000 Chinese lived on "Double Island" and that it was known locally as "Má-sù". The same source said that all foreigners in Shantou lived on Mayu, and that the island was the only place where foreigners could live safely.

== In modern times ==
In the PRC era, the island has been used as a defense outpost. After 1949, it was made a restricted military zone, then reopened to the public in 1979, and since then it has become a tourist destination. Near the Dragon King temple is a beach for swimming.

In December 1995, with the construction of the Shantou Bay Bridge, the island became the location of some of the bridge's piers.

In the water near the island's dock is a piece of pumice that locals call the "stone with the mark of the mother" (simplified Chinese: 妈印石; traditional Chinese: 媽印石; pinyin: mā yìn shí), said to be a vestige left by Mazu when she became a spirit and disappeared into the ocean.
