= Jinping, Shantou =

District in Guangdong, China

Jinping 金平区
- District
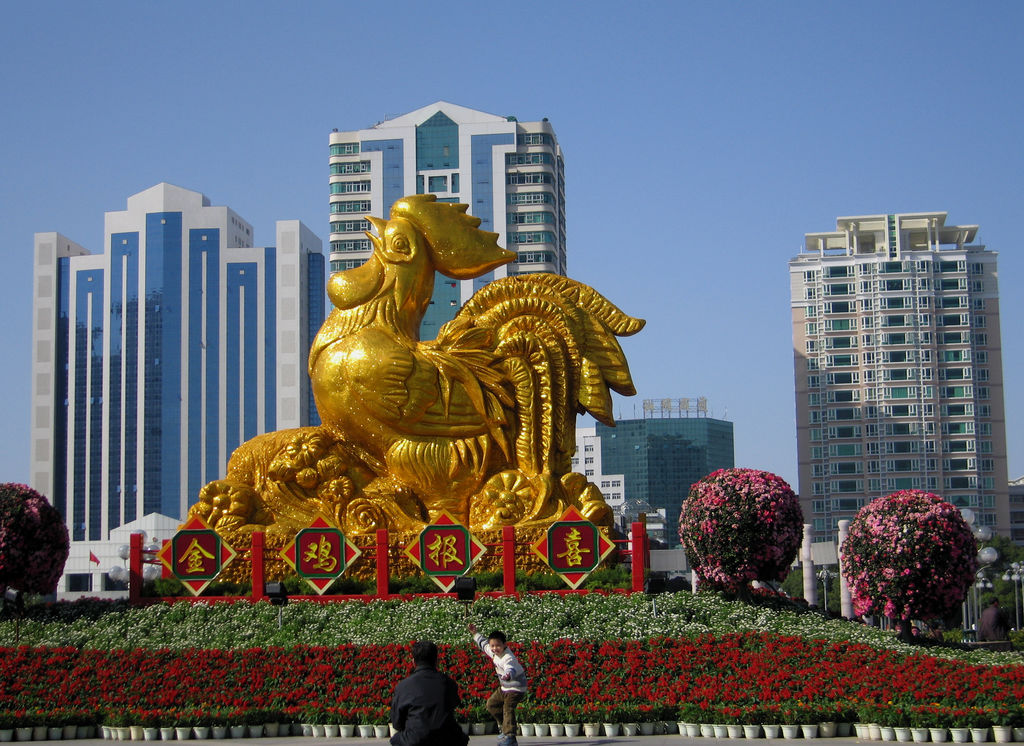
- People's Square

- Location of Jinping in Shantou

- Location in Guangdong
- Coordinates: 23°21′55″N 116°42′07″E
- Country: People's Republic of China
- Province: Guangdong
- Prefecture-level city: Shantou

Area
  - Total: 108.71 km^{2} (41.97 sq mi)

Population (2010)
  - Total: 810,284
  - Density: 7,453.6/km^{2} (19,305/sq mi)
- Time zone: UTC+8 (China Standard)

Jinping District (Chinese: 金平; pinyin: Jīnpíng, Teochew Peng'im: gim¹ pêng⁵) is the central business district and the seat of Shantou prefecture-level city in the Guangdong Province of Mainland China. The site the district stands on is the old city of Shantou established by Emperor Hongwu of the Ming Dynasty in AD 1369, with the name derived from Shashantou Fort built in the city 4 centuries later. The Jinping administrative district was established in 2003, and serves as a major hub for manufacturing, shipping and tourism. The district government is located at No. 50 Jinsha Middle Road.

== Administrative divisions ==
There are 12 subdistricts in the district:

Administrative divisions of Jinping District
English name	Chinese	Pinyin	Area in km^{2}	Population	Divisions	
English name	Chinese	Pinyin	Area in km^{2}	Population	Residential communities	Administrative villages
Jinping District	金平区	Jīnpíng Qū	140.05	823,327	169	0
Shipaotai Subdistrict	石炮台街道	Shípàotái Jiēdào			13	0
Jinsha Subdistrict	金砂街道	Jīnshā Jiēdào		76,935	10	0
Dongfang Subdistrict	东方街道	Dōngfāng Jiēdào		67,818	11	0
Dahua Subdistrict	大华街道	Dàhuá Jiēdào		71,471	12	0
Guangsha Subdistrict	广厦街道	Guǎngshà Jiēdào		82,825	11	0
Qishan Subdistrict	岐山街道	Qíshān Jiēdào		27,991	10	0
Tuolian Subdistrict	鮀莲街道	Tuólián Jiēdào		51,720	16	0
Tuojiang Subdistrict	鮀江街道	Tuójiāng Jiēdào		61,863	17	0
Yuepu Subdistrict	月浦街道	Yuèpǔ Jiēdào		26,680	5	0
Xiaogongyuan Subdistrict	小公园街道	Xiǎogōngyuán Jiēdào		27,697	7	0
Jindong Subdistrict	金东街道	Jīndōng Jiēdào		51,424	6	0
Guanghua Subdistrict	光华街道	Guānghuá Jiēdào		45,094	10	0

== Famous Sites and Landmarks ==
- Shantou City Hall - Established in AD 1921 during the old Republic of China.
- Shashantou Fort - Established in AD 1717 by the Kangxi Emperor of the Qing dynasty.
- Haibin Stadium - The downtown Shantou soccer arena.

== Education ==
- Feixia Middle School
