= Shantou Experimental School =

Coordinates: 23°22′01″N 116°44′17″E

Shantou Experimental School 汕头市实验学校

Location
- Fengze Estate, Block 35, Longhu District, Shantou City

Information
- Type: public school
- Motto: 自强不息 厚德载物 'Pursue for the stronger' 'Grow in moral goodness'
- Established: September 1999
- Principal: Chen shengxiao (陈升孝)
- Staff: 175
- Grades: Year 1-9
- Enrollment: 5000
- Website: http://stssyxx.stedu.net http://stsy.edugd.cn

Shantou Experimental School (汕头市 实验 学校 Shàn-tóu-shì shí-yàn xué-xiào) is a public school, located in Longhu District, within the city proper of Shantou, Guangdong, China.

Established in 1999 and operated by the Education Bureau of Shantou City, the school currently caters for approximately 3000 students from Years 1 to 9.
