= CK Tang =

Singaporean businessman

- Born: Tang Choon Keng; 11 September 1901; Shantou, Guangdong, China
- Died: 3 September 2000 (aged 98); Singapore
- Occupation: Entrepreneur
- Known for: Founder of Tangs department store

Tang Choon Keng (Chinese: 董俊竞; pinyin: Dǒng Jùnjìng; 12 September 1901 – 3 September 2000), colloquially known as CK Tang, was a Singaporean entrepreneur, who founded the Tangs department store in Singapore. Tang established Orchard Road as a premier retail district in Singapore.

== Early life ==
A Teochew, Tang was born in early 20th century Shantou, China to a Presbyterian pastor. He emigrated to the British colony of Singapore in 1923.

In Singapore, Tang peddled hand-made Swatow lace, embroidery and linen products. With a rented rickshaw, Tang carried his goods in a pair of tin trunks, which he kept long afterwards. Tang later became known as the "Tin Trunk Man" and the "Curio King" for his rags to riches story.

== Establishment of Tangs ==
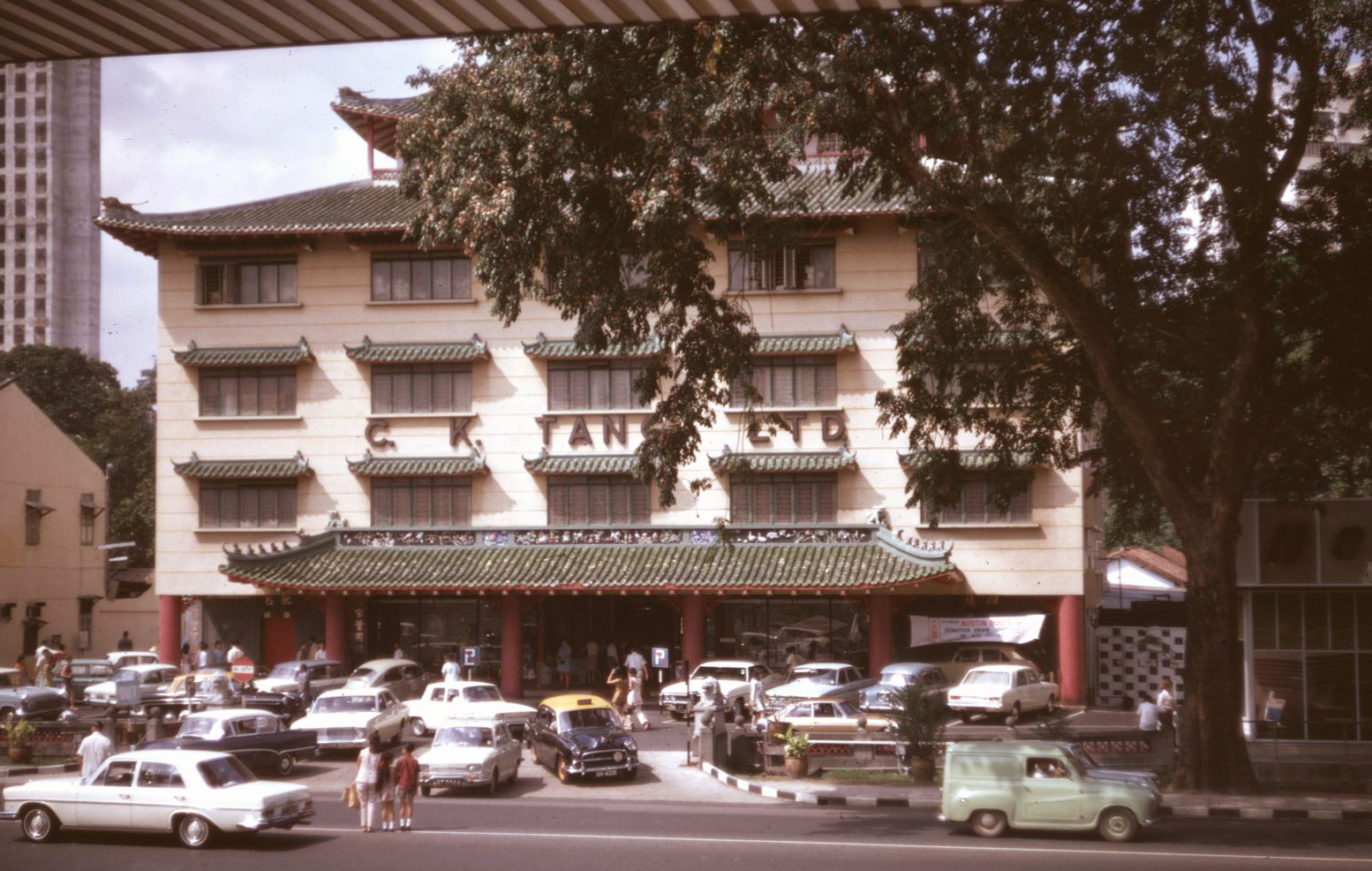
Tangs department store, Singapore, photographed c. 1970

In 1932, Tang was able to embark on a larger venture. He established a department store in 1932 with an initial capital of S$3,000. Tang set up his first shop on the first floor of a building on River Valley Road, selling craft products from China.

Subsequently, in 1940, Tang financed the construction of a new building at the corner of Jalan Mohamed Sultan and River Valley Road to house a new department store. He called the new edifice Gainurn Building, a variation of his father's name Tang Gan Urn. By the 1950s, CK Tang had opened several more branches.

In 1958, Tang bought a 1,351-square metre piece of land at the corner of Orchard Road and Scotts Road at a cost of S$10,000 to further his vision of expanding his business. Although the site faced the Tai San Ting Cemetery, he felt that it had commercial value as many British housewives in the Tanglin area could stop by on their way to the city. The decision was made against the advice of fellow businessmen who thought Orchard Road was unfashionable then. Years later, when the Singapore Government designated and developed Orchard Road as a prime shopping and tourist district, the price of land soared from S$3 per m^{2} to S$6,000 per m^{2}.

With the acquired land plot, Tang constructed the landmark C.K. Tang Department Store (now rebranded as Tangs) at 310 Orchard Road at a cost of S$50,000. The building's green-tiled roof and facade was modelled after the Imperial Palace of the Forbidden City in Beijing. In 1960, Tang voluntarily closed the store due to problems with the trade unions, but Tangs was re-opened the following year. In 1975, Tang's company was publicly listed.

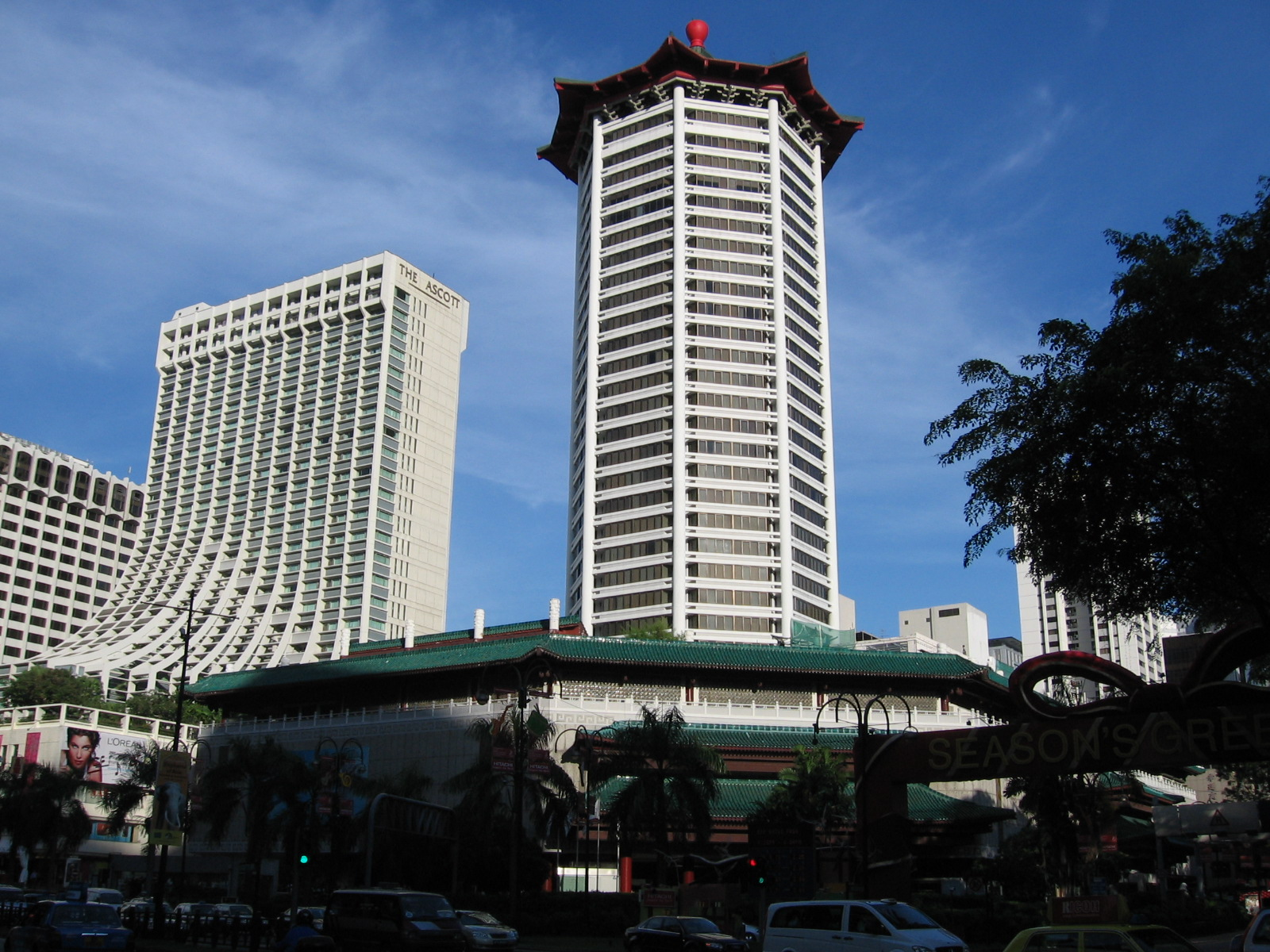
Marriott Hotel, Singapore (formerly the Dynasty Hotel) and Tang Plaza were built in 1982 to expand Tang Choon Keng's business on Orchard Road.

In the late 1970s, Tang expanded his business again when he decided to develop the neighboring property lots which he had bought years before. In 1982, the building on Orchard Road was demolished to make way for the new Tang complex, comprising the 33-story deluxe Dynasty Hotel (now the Singapore Marriott Hotel) and the Tangs shopping complex (now Tang Plaza). The shopping complex consists of five floors of retail space covering more than 15,000 m^{2}, marketed under the slogan "All The Best Under One Roof".

In 1991, Tangs opened its first overseas branch in Kuala Lumpur, Malaysia. Tang also collaborated with Malaysia's Mayang Sari Bhd to develop real estate, hotels and commercial properties in Kuala Lumpur. He also assisted the Dairy Farm International Holdings in its retail business in Malaysia.

Until 1996, Tangs was the only major shopping centre in Singapore to not operate on Sundays, in deference to Tang's Christian faith. Tang instituted the policy so that his family and Christian staff could attend church on Sundays. As a staunch Christian, Tang spoke of honesty and hard work as his guiding principles.

Tang's distinctive management philosophy was the focus on people, both customers and staff. Emphasis was given to quality of the staff, reasonable pricing and warm service. Tang believed in investing in his staff, as his frontline staff would be the ones who would be in direct contact with the customers and he believed that the image of the store depended on them. As a result, Tang reserved a substantial annual budget for staff training, which included tailored programs for sales staff, supervisors and management. Supervisors and managers were expected to undergo a minimum 100 hours of training. Tang also made an effort to get in touch with his staff at all levels, in order understand his customers' expectations on product and service quality. Despite the company's poor financial results in certain years, Tangs retained its reputation for good service and reliability.

Tang retired in 1987, handing the reins of corporate leadership to the second of his three sons, Tang Wee Sung. Tang retained the post of company president and was rarely out of touch with company business, personally checking the company's accounts and meeting suppliers.

== Personal life ==
Besides CK Tang, Tang Choon Keng was also known as Tang Un Tien.

In 1960, Tang was kidnapped by four armed thugs, but was freed unharmed within 84 hours after the family reportedly paid S$150,000 in ransom.

Tang's first wife died in 1980; he subsequently remarried. Tang had eight children. On 3 September 2000, Tang died peacefully at home with his family around him at 99 years old.

== See also ==
- List of kidnappings (1960–1969)
- List of solved missing person cases (1950–1969)
