= Shantou Bay Bridge =

Shantou Bay Bridge 汕头海湾大桥
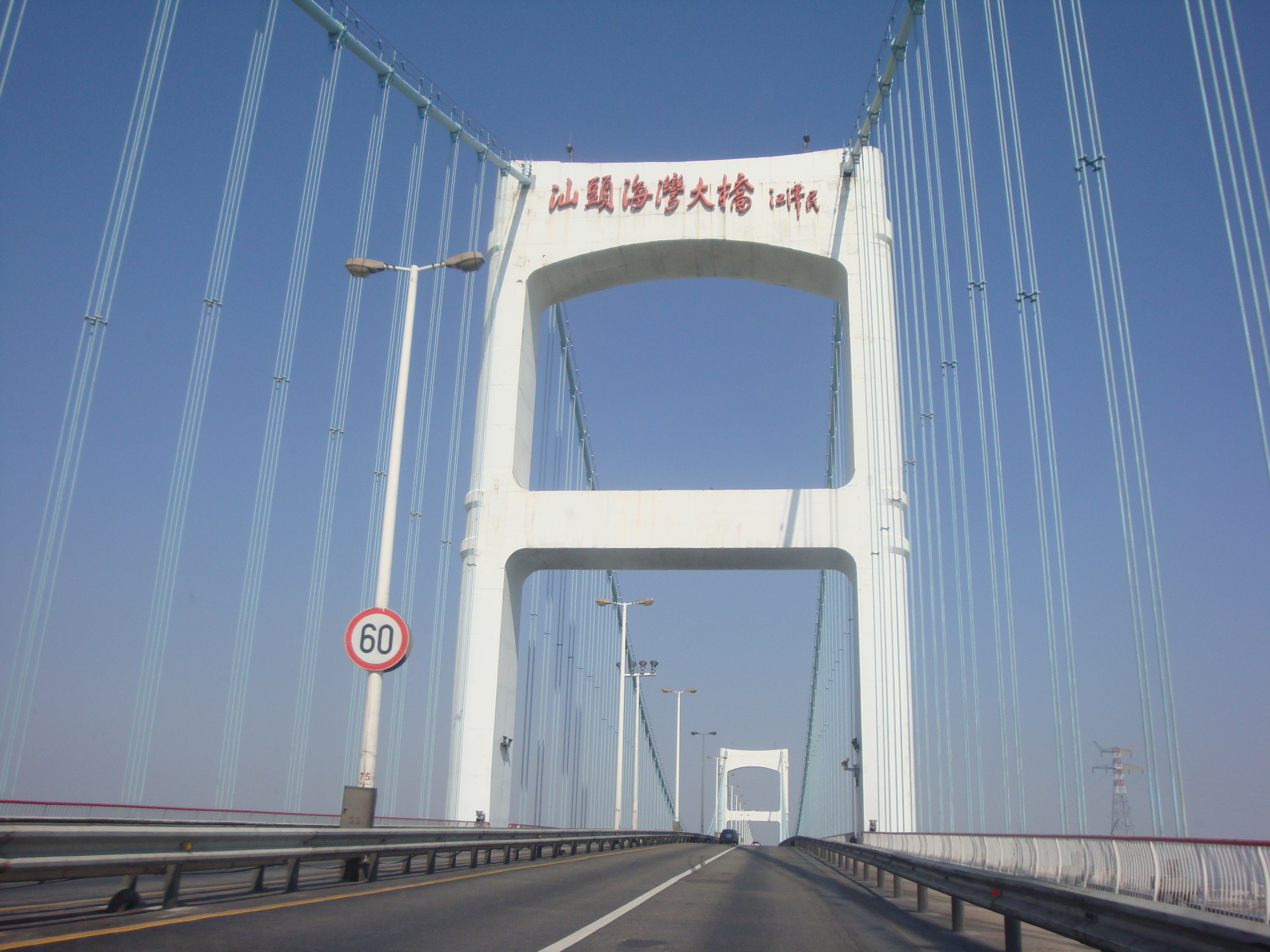
- Coordinates: 23.331883°N 116.744884°E
- Carries: G15 Shenyang–Haikou Expressway
- Crosses: Shantou Harbour on the Rong River
- Locale: Shantou, Guangdong, China

Characteristics
- Design: Suspension bridge
- Total length: 2,420 metres (7,940 ft)
- Longest span: 452 metres (1,483 ft)
- Clearance below: 38 metres (125 ft)

History
- Opened: 1995

Location
- Interactive map of Shantou Bay Bridge

The Shantou Bay Bridge is a suspension bridge located in Shantou, Guangdong Province, China. Built in 1995, it has a main span of 452 metres (1,483 ft). It is nicknamed "The Goddess of Bridges". The bridge carries the G15 Shenyang–Haikou Expressway.

== See also ==
- List of longest suspension bridge spans
- Mayu Island
- Queshi Bridge
