= Haibin Stadium =

Sports venue in Shantou, Guangdong, China

Coordinates: 23.3523061848°N 116.6859368384°E

Haibin Stadium 海滨体育场
- Interactive map of Haibin Stadium 海滨体育场
- Full name: Haibin Stadium 海滨体育场
- Location: Shantou, Guangdong, China
- Owner: Shantou People's Government
- Operator: Shantou Sports Bureau
- Capacity: 10,000
- Surface: Grass

Construction
- Opened: 28 May 1986
- Renovated: 2001; 2014

Tenant
- Shantou Lions

Haibin Stadium (Chinese: 海滨体育场; lit. 'Coastal Stadium') is a multi-purpose stadium in Shantou, Guangdong, China. It was opened on 28 May 1986 with capacity of 10,000. Association football club Shantou Lions use the venue for home games.
