= Double Island (Washington) =

Island in San Juan County, Washington, United States

- Location within Washington (state)

Geography
- Location: West Sound, Salish Sea
- Coordinates: 48.6067684°N 122.9724042°W
- Archipelago: San Juan Islands
- Area: 25.94 acres (10.50 ha)
- Highest elevation: 85 ft (25.9 m)

Administration
- United States
- State: Washington
- County: San Juan County

Double Island is a pair of islands located in the San Juan Islands, in West Sound, Salish Sea, Washington. Double Island refers collectively to two islands separated by a 10-foot channel. Big Double Island is 18 acres, and sits directly north of Alegria Island, or Little Double Island.

== Geography ==
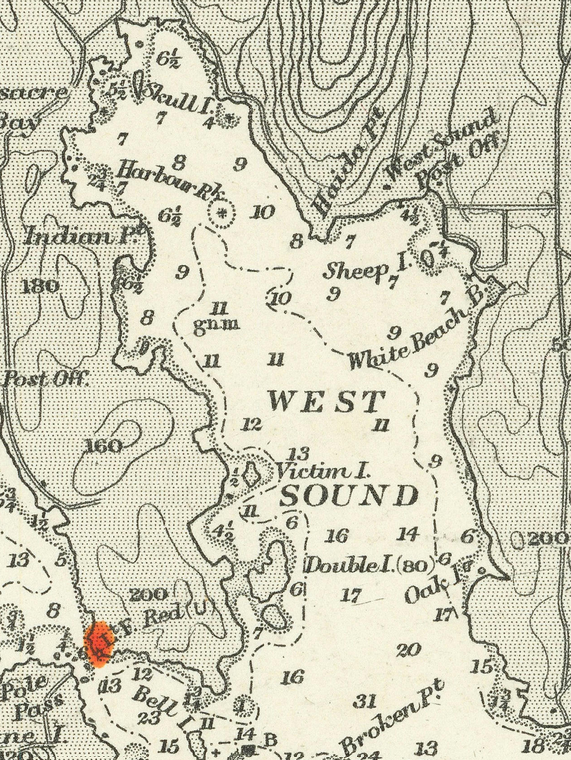
Detail from a 1911 British Admiralty Chart showing West Sound. Double Island is marked in the lower center of the image.

Double Island is located at the southwestern entrance of West Sound, a bay of Orcas Island. The islands are a quarter mile south of Victim Island.

== History ==
The name Double Island first appears on an 1858-1860 British Admiralty chart. Alegria Island was coined in 1977 by the island's owners.

Big Double Island features a home designed by architect Thomas Bosworth.
