= Shantou =

Prefecture-level city in Guangdong, China

Shantou 汕头市 Swatow; Shantow
- Prefecture-level city
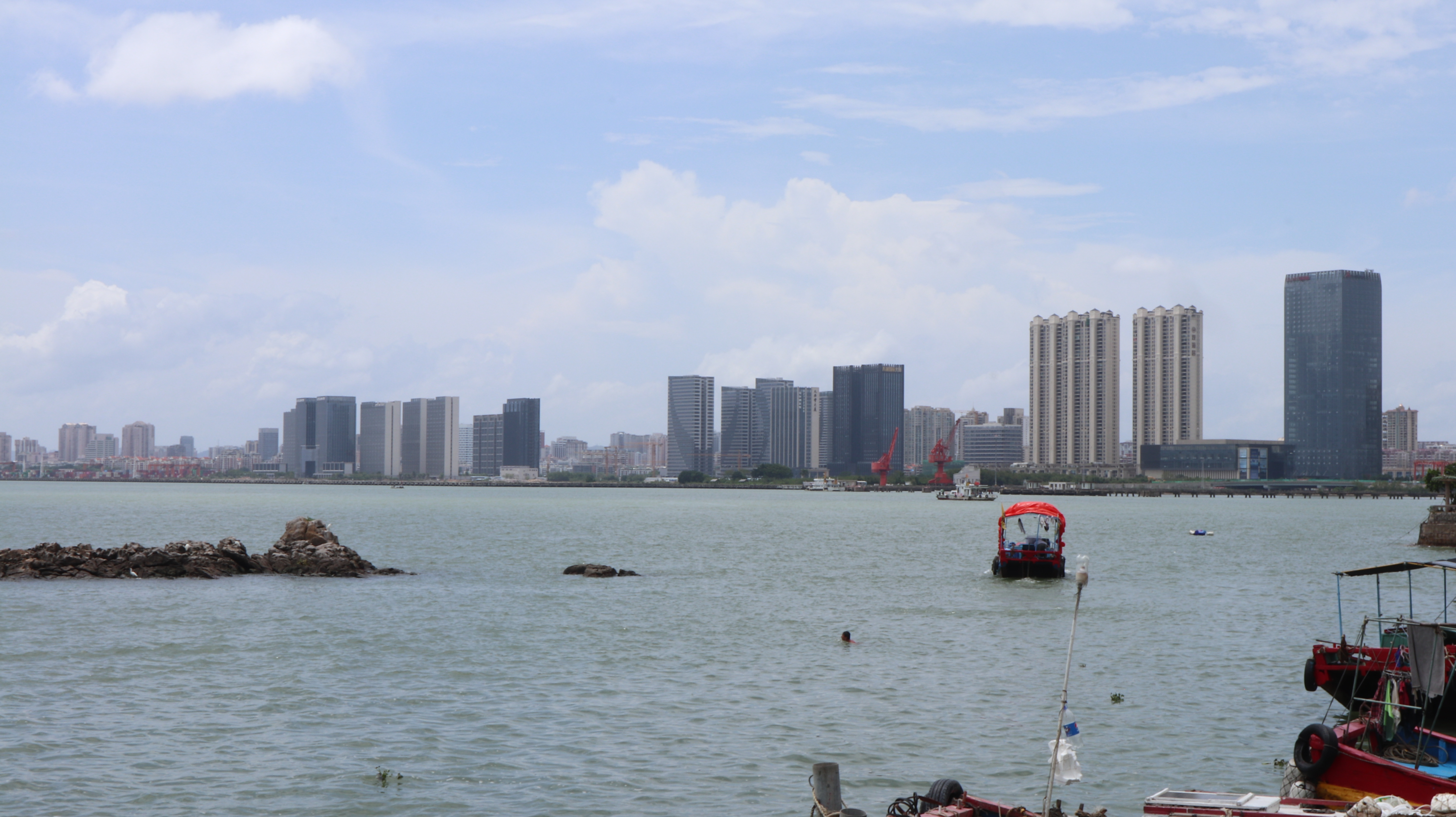
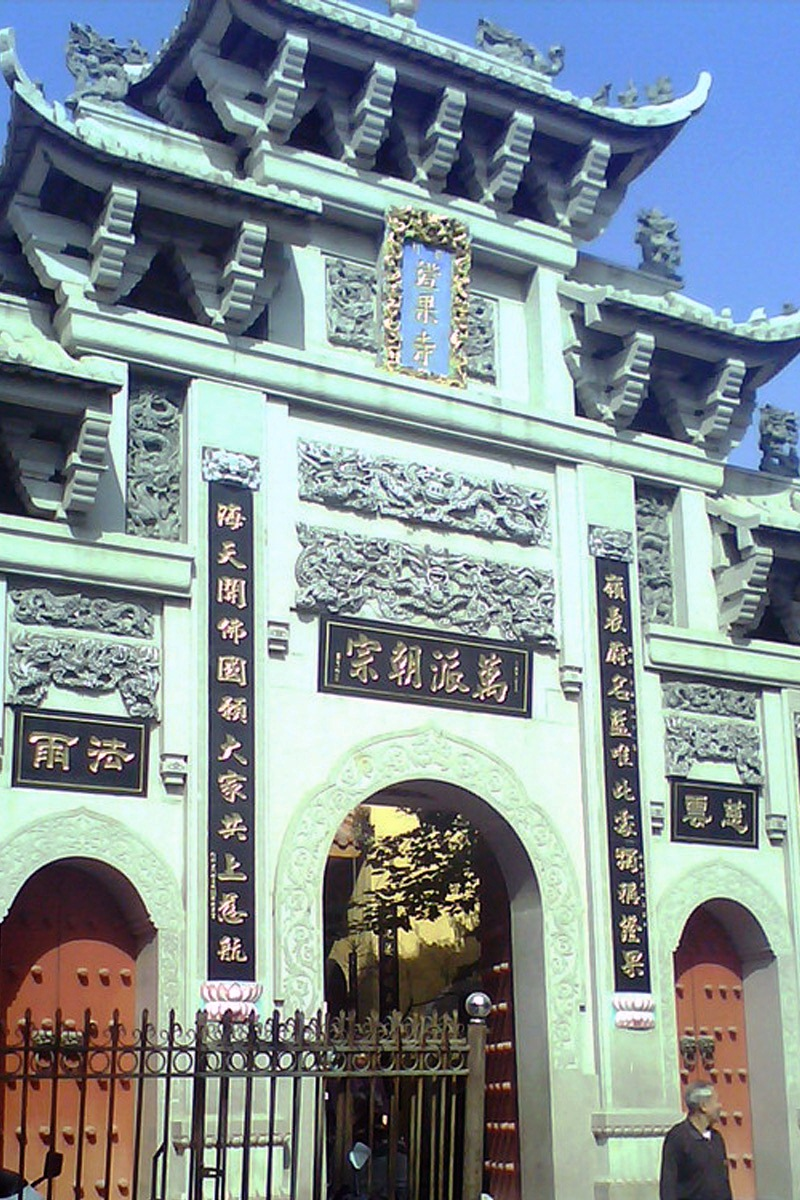
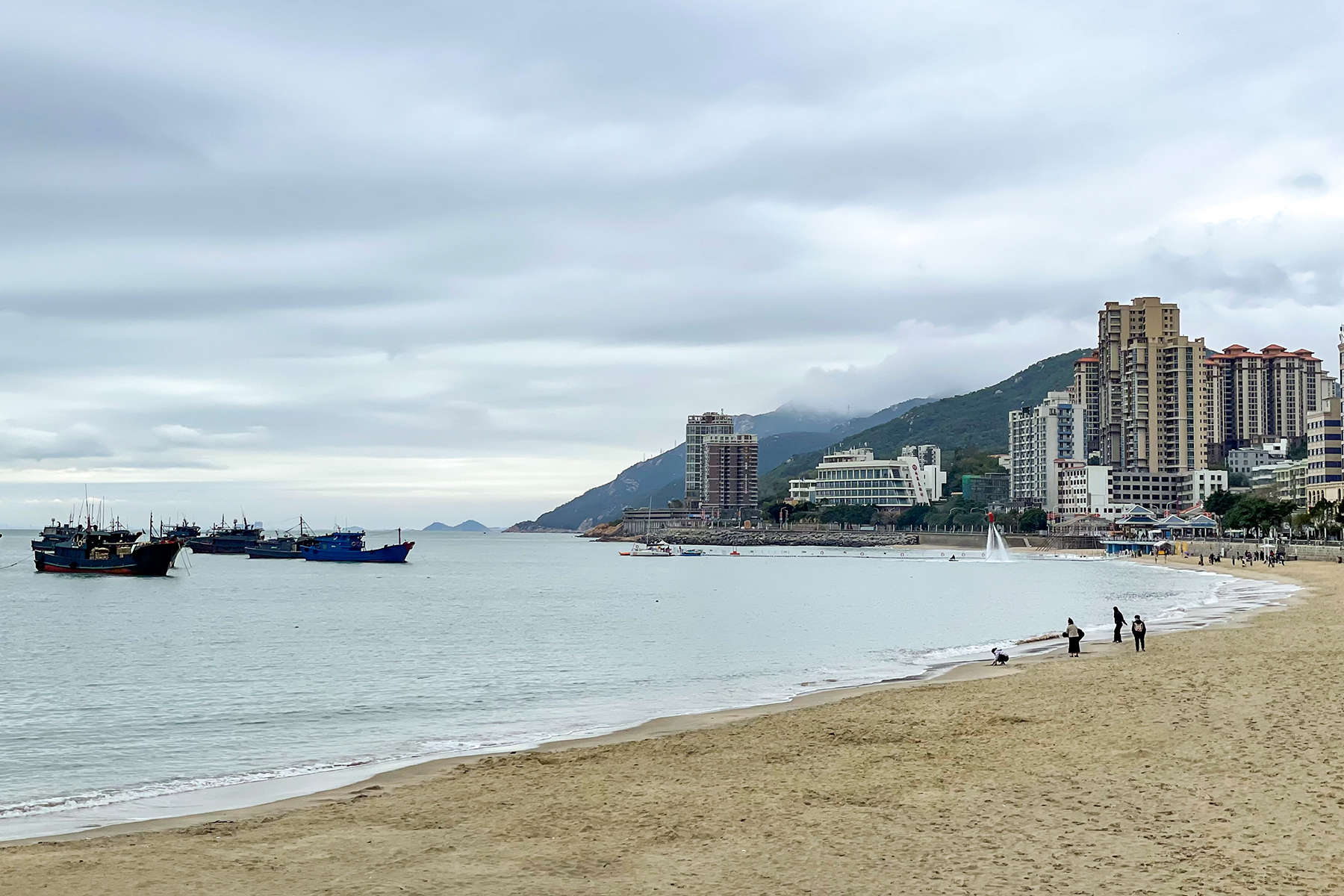
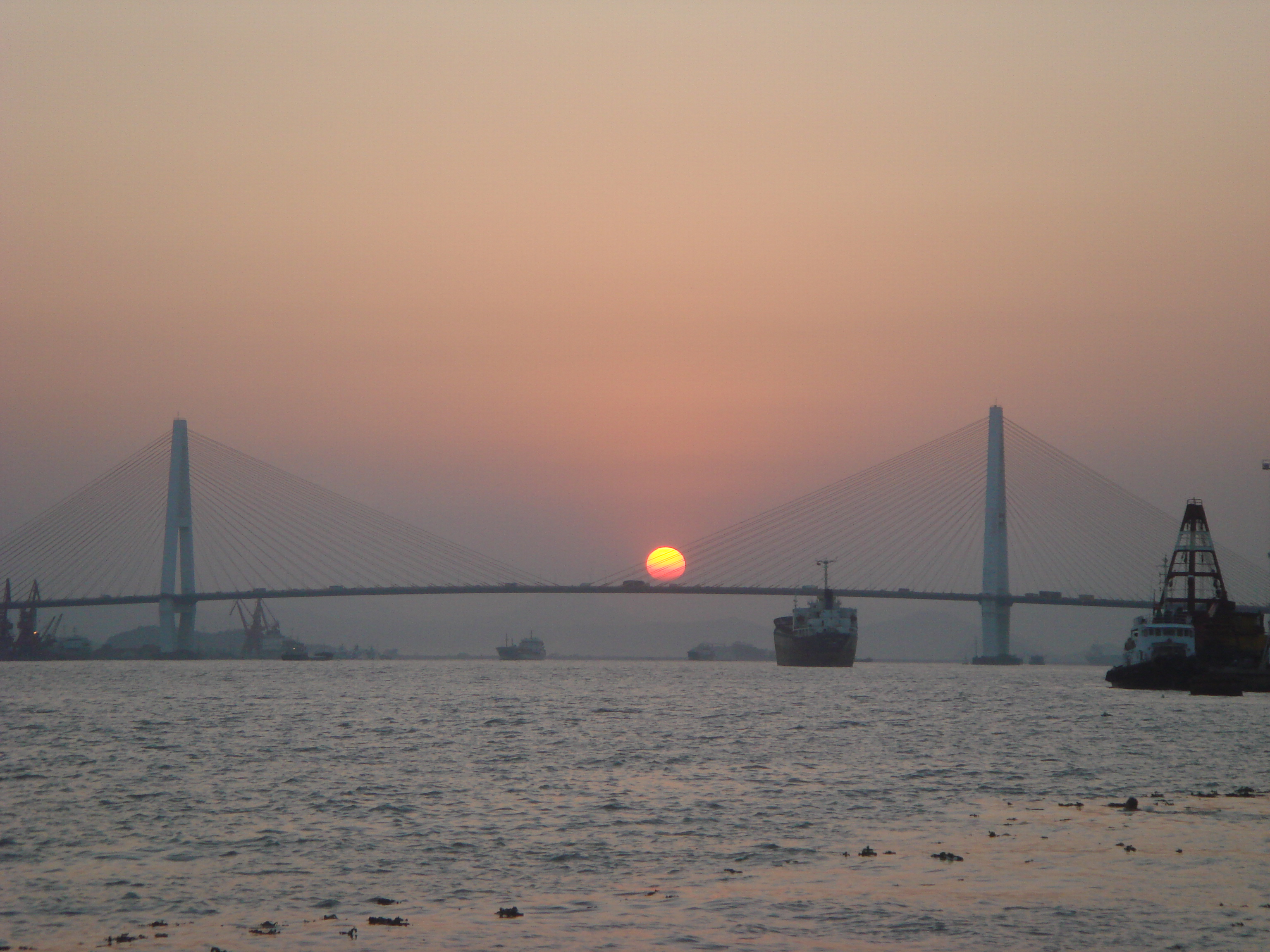
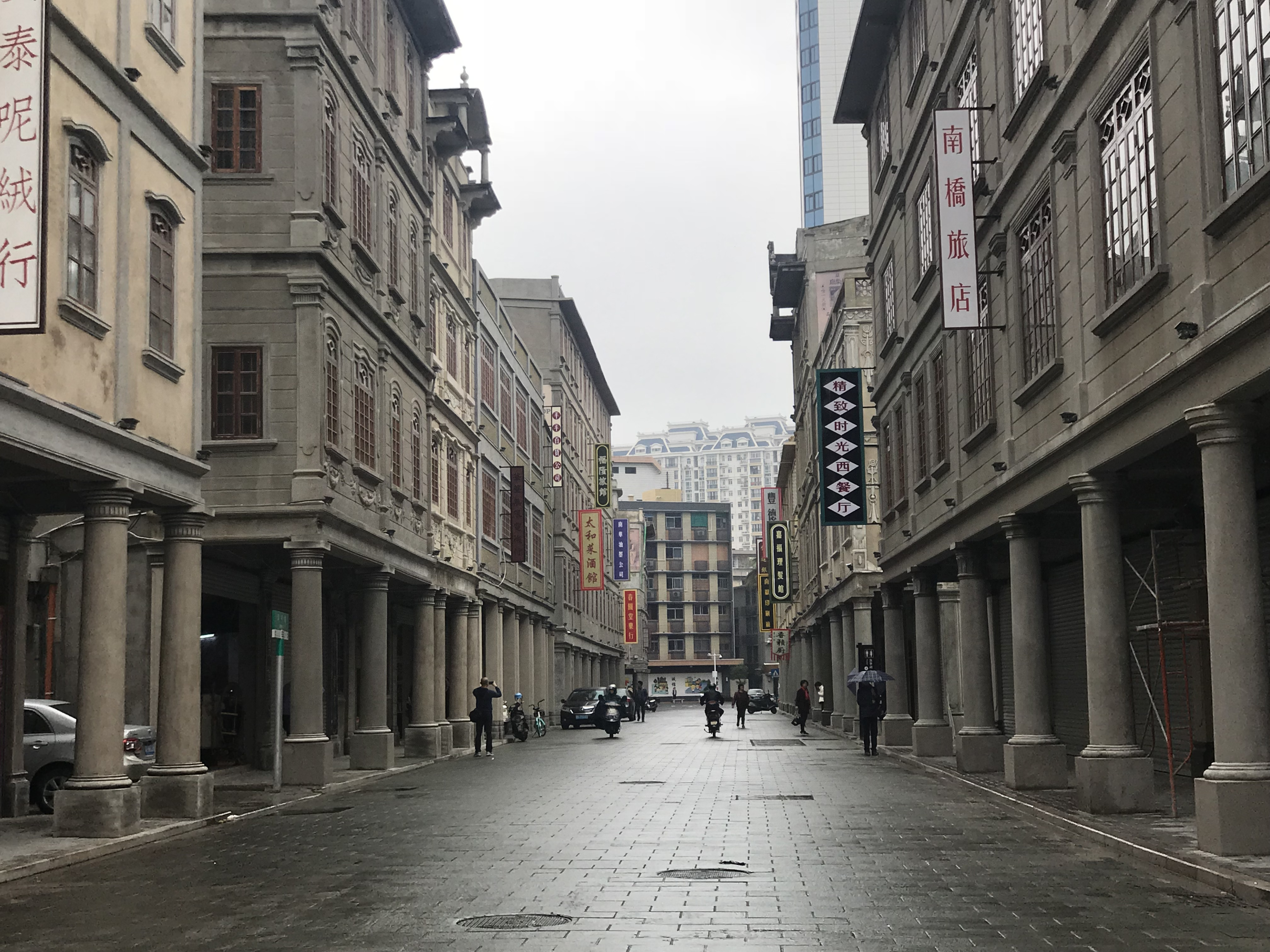
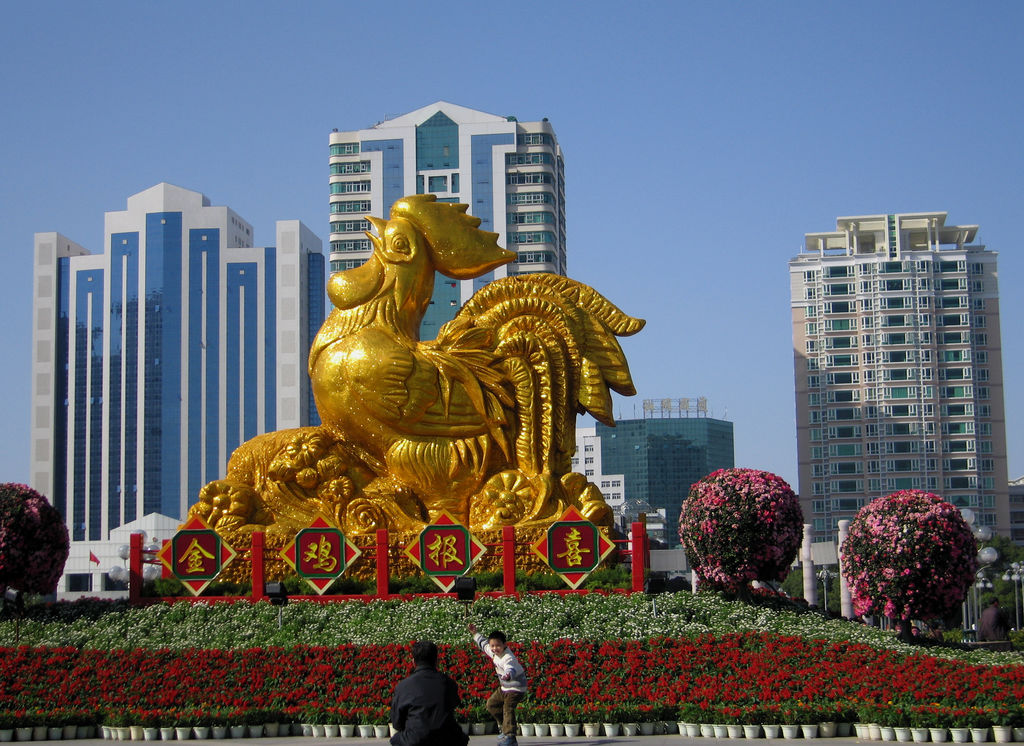
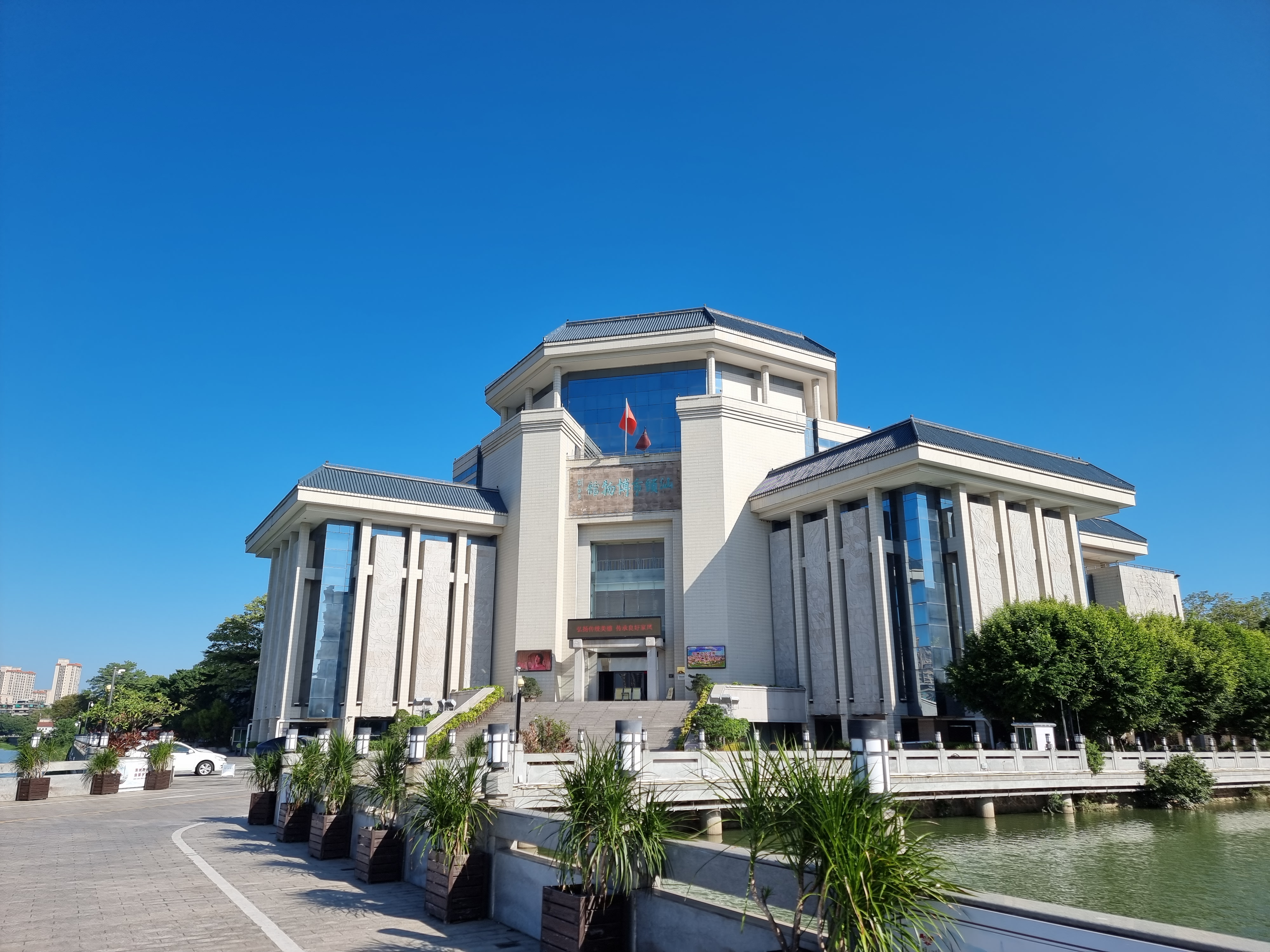
- Skyline of Shantou Zhengguo Temple Nan'ao Island Queshi Bridge Guoping Road in Downtown Shantou People's Square in Jinping Shantou Museum

- Location of Shantou City jurisdiction in Guangdong

- Location in China
- Coordinates (Shantou municipal government): 23°21′14″N 116°40′55″E
- Country: People's Republic of China
- Province: Guangdong
- Municipal seat: Jinping District

Government
  - CPC Committee Secretary: Fang Lixu (方利旭)
  - Mayor: Zheng Jiange (郑剑戈)

Area
  - Prefecture-level city: 2,248.39 km^{2} (868.11 sq mi)
  - Metro: 9,297.1 km^{2} (3,589.6 sq mi)
- Elevation: 51 m (167 ft)

Population (2020 census)
  - Prefecture-level city: 5,502,031
  - Density: 2,447.10/km^{2} (6,337.96/sq mi)
  - Urban: 4,312,192
  - Metro: 12,543,024
  - Metro density: 1,349.1/km^{2} (3,494.2/sq mi)
  - Major Nationalities: Han

GDP
  - Prefecture-level city: CN¥ 293 billion US$ 45.4 billion
  - Per capita: CN¥ 53,106; US$ 8,232
- Time zone: UTC+8 (China Standard)
- Postal Code: 515000, 515041
- Area code: 754
- ISO 3166 code: CN-GD-05
- Language: Teochew, Standard Chinese (Official)
- Local dialect: Swatow dialect
- License Plate Prefix: 粤D
- Website: www.shantou.gov.cn

Shantou
- "Shàntóu", as written in Chinese
- Simplified Chinese: 汕头
- Traditional Chinese: 汕頭
- Postal: Swatow
- Literal meaning: Fish-basket Point
Transcriptions
Standard Mandarin
- Hanyu Pinyin: Shàntóu
- IPA: [ʂân.tʰǒʊ]
Wu
- Romanization: Sae去deu平
Hakka
- Romanization: Sân-thèu
Yue: Cantonese
- Yale Romanization: Saantàuh
- Jyutping: Saan3 tau4
Southern Min
- Hokkien POJ: Sòaⁿ-thâu
- Teochew Peng'im: Suan^{1}tao^{5}

Shantou, alternately romanized as Swatow and sometimes known as Santow, is a prefecture-level city on the eastern coast of Guangdong, China, with a total population of 5,502,031 as of the 2020 census (5,391,028 in 2010) and an administrative area of 2,248.39 square kilometres (868.11 sq mi). However, its built-up (or metro) area is much bigger with 12,543,024 inhabitants including Rongcheng and Jiedong districts, Jiexi county and Puning city in Jieyang plus all of Chaozhou city largely conurbated. This is de facto the 5th built-up area in mainland China between Hangzhou-Shaoxing (13,035,026 inhabitants), Xi'an-Xianyang (12,283,922 inhabitants) and Tianjin (11,165,706 inhabitants).

Shantou, a city significant in 19th-century Chinese history as one of the treaty ports established for Western trade and contact, was one of the original special economic zones of China established in the 1980s, but did not blossom in the manner that cities such as Shenzhen, Xiamen and Zhuhai did. However, it remains eastern Guangdong's economic centre, and is home to Shantou University, which is under the provincial Project 211 program in Guangdong.

== History ==
Shantou was a fishing village part of Tuojiang Du (鮀江都), Jieyang County during the Song dynasty. It came to be known as Xialing (廈嶺) during the Yuan dynasty. In 1563, Shantou became a part of Chenghai County in Chao Prefecture (Chaozhou). As early as 1574, Shantou had been called Shashanping (沙汕坪). In the seventeenth century, a cannon platform called Shashantou Cannon (沙汕頭炮臺) was made here, and the place name later was shortened to "Shantou". Locally it has been referred to as Kialat.

Connecting to Shantou across the Queshi Bridge is Queshi (礐石) which had been known by the local people through the 19th century as Kakchio. It was the main site for the American and British consulates. Today the area is a scenic park but some of the structures from its earlier history are somewhat preserved. In 1860, Shantou was opened for foreigners and became a trading port according to Treaty of Tientsin.

It became a city in 1919, and was separated from Chenghai in 1921. 1922 saw the devastating Swatow Typhoon, which killed 5,000 out of the 65,000 people then inhabiting the city. Some nearby villages were totally destroyed. Several ships near the coast were totally wrecked. Other ones were blown as far as two miles inland. The area around the city had around another 50,000 casualties. The total death toll was above 60,000, and may have been higher than 100,000.

In the 1930s, as a transport hub and merchandise distribution centre in Southeast China, Shantou Port's cargo throughput ranked third in the country. A brief account of a visit to the city in English during this period is the English accountant Max Relton's A Man in the East: A Journey through French Indo-China (Michael Joseph Ltd., London, 1939). On 21 June 1939, Japanese troops invaded Shantou. Japanese forces occupied Shantou until 15 August 1945. The Communist People's Liberation Army captured Shantou on 24 October 1949, 23 days after the People's Republic of China was founded.

With higher-level administrative authority, Shantou governed Chaozhou City and Jieyang City from 1983 to 1989.

== Geography ==
Shantou is located in eastern Guangdong with latitude spanning 23°02′33″ – 23°38′50″ N and longitude 116°14′40″ – 117°19′35″ E; the Tropic of Cancer passes through the northern part of the city, and along it there is a monument, in fact the easternmost in mainland China, at 23°26′33″N 116°35′20″E. The highest peak in the city's administration is Mount Dajian (大尖山) on Nan'ao Island, at 587 m (1,926 ft); the highest peak on the geographic mainland is Mount Lianhua (莲花山), at 562 m (1,844 ft) in Chenghai District. The city is located at the mouths of the Han, Rong (榕江), and Lian Rivers.

Shantou is 301 km (187 mi) northeast of Hong Kong.

=== Climate ===
Shantou has a monsoon-influenced humid subtropical climate (Köppen Cwa), with short, mild to warm winters, and long, hot, humid summers. Winter begins sunny and dry but becomes progressively wetter and cloudier. Spring is generally overcast, while summer brings the heaviest rains of the year though is much sunnier; there are 8.2 days annually with 50 mm (1.97 in) of rainfall. Autumn is sunny and dry. The monthly 24-hour average temperature ranges from 14.7 °C (58.5 °F) in January to 29.1 °C (84.4 °F) in July, and the annual mean is 22.58 °C (72.6 °F). The annual rainfall is around 1,618 mm (64 in), about 60% of which occurs from May to August. With monthly percent possible sunshine ranging from 28% in March to 58% in July and October, the city receives 1,979 hours of bright sunshine annually. Extremes since 1951 have ranged from 0.3 °C (33 °F) on 29 December 1991 (unofficial record of −0.6 °C (31 °F) was set on 18 January 1893) to 38.9 °C (102 °F) on 11 July and August 8, 2026.

Climate data for Shantou, elevation 2 m (6.6 ft), (1991–2020 normals, extremes 1951–present)
Month	Jan	Feb	Mar	Apr	May	Jun	Jul	Aug	Sep	Oct	Nov	Dec	Year
Record high °C (°F)	29.0 (84.2)	29.7 (85.5)	31.6 (88.9)	35.0 (95.0)	36.7 (98.1)	37.5 (99.5)	38.9 (102.0)	38.9 (102.0)	37.3 (99.1)	36.0 (96.8)	33.1 (91.6)	30.0 (86.0)	38.9 (102.0)
Mean daily maximum °C (°F)	18.8 (65.8)	19.3 (66.7)	21.6 (70.9)	25.4 (77.7)	28.7 (83.7)	31.1 (88.0)	32.7 (90.9)	32.5 (90.5)	31.5 (88.7)	28.7 (83.7)	25.1 (77.2)	20.9 (69.6)	26.4 (79.5)
Daily mean °C (°F)	14.8 (58.6)	15.3 (59.5)	17.7 (63.9)	21.7 (71.1)	25.3 (77.5)	27.9 (82.2)	29.1 (84.4)	28.9 (84.0)	27.9 (82.2)	25.0 (77.0)	21.1 (70.0)	16.8 (62.2)	22.6 (72.7)
Mean daily minimum °C (°F)	11.8 (53.2)	12.6 (54.7)	15.0 (59.0)	18.9 (66.0)	22.8 (73.0)	25.5 (77.9)	26.4 (79.5)	26.2 (79.2)	25.2 (77.4)	21.9 (71.4)	17.9 (64.2)	13.6 (56.5)	19.8 (67.7)
Record low °C (°F)	0.4 (32.7)	1.1 (34.0)	3.0 (37.4)	8.3 (46.9)	14.2 (57.6)	17.1 (62.8)	20.8 (69.4)	21.6 (70.9)	16.4 (61.5)	8.2 (46.8)	4.6 (40.3)	0.3 (32.5)	0.3 (32.5)
Average precipitation mm (inches)	38.0 (1.50)	48.2 (1.90)	85.9 (3.38)	146.5 (5.77)	194.3 (7.65)	283.0 (11.14)	223.2 (8.79)	282.9 (11.14)	149.2 (5.87)	34.0 (1.34)	43.5 (1.71)	40.9 (1.61)	1,569.6 (61.8)
Average precipitation days (≥ 0.1 mm)	6.1	8.7	10.8	11.4	14.0	16.4	13.8	13.7	9.2	3.7	4.4	6.1	118.3
Average relative humidity (%)	74	77	78	79	80	83	80	80	76	69	72	71	77
Mean monthly sunshine hours	144.8	112.5	112.0	127.3	153.8	172.6	241.9	214.5	202.7	211.9	176.8	160.0	2,030.8
Percentage possible sunshine	43	35	30	33	37	43	58	54	55	59	54	48	46
Source 1: China Meteorological Administration NOAA extremes
Source 2: Weather China

== Administration ==
Shantou is a prefecture-level city. It has direct jurisdiction over six districts and one county.

Administrative divisions of Shantou
Division code	English name	Chinese	Pinyin	Area in km^{2}	Population 2020	Seat	Postal code	Divisions			
Division code	English name	Chinese	Pinyin	Area in km^{2}	Population 2020	Seat	Postal code	Subdistricts	Towns	Residential communities	Administrative villages
440500	Shantou City	汕头市	Shàntóu Shì	2,179.95	5,502,031	Jinping District	515000	37	32	517	548
440507	Longhu District	龙湖区	Lónghú Qū	114.20	630,749	Jinxia Subdistrict	515000	5	2	80	32
440511	Jinping District	金平区	Jīnpíng Qū	140.05	777,024	Shipaotai Subdistrict	515000	17		169	
440512	Haojiang District	濠江区	Háojiāng Qū	169.08	269,471	Dahao Subdistrict	515000	7		60	
440513	Chaoyang District	潮阳区	Cháoyáng Qū	665.74	1,654,276	Wenguang Subdistrict	515100	4	9	93	179
440514	Chaonan District	潮南区	Cháonán Qū	599.86	1,231,638	Xiashan Subdistrict	515100	1	10	65	167
440515	Chenghai District	澄海区	Chénghǎi Qū	378.35	874,444	Chenghua Subdistrict	515800	3	8	45	137
440523	Nan'ao County	南澳县	Nán'ào Xiàn	112.66	64,429	Houzhai Town	515900		3	5	33

As of 2003, the district of Haojiang was established out of Hepu and Dahao which had been merged, and the district of Jinping Shengping and Jinyuan; Waisha and Xinxi Town, part of former Chenghai City, was merged into Longhu District; Chenghai City became Chenghai District; Chaoyang City was divided and became Chaoyang and Chaonan District respectively.

== Economy ==
Shantou's economy is medium by Guangdong standards. Manufacturing accounts for a large and increasing share of employment, with canning, garments, lithography, plastic, and toys being some of the principal products. Toy manufacturing is the city's leading export industry, with 400 million U.S. dollars' worth of exports each year. Canaton Calculator Co. is a multinational electronic devices manufacturing company.

Guiyu, a populous town in Chaoyang District, is the biggest electronic waste site on earth. Health-environmental issues incurred have concerned international organizations such as Greenpeace.

In 2000, the biggest tax fraud in the history of the People's Republic of China was uncovered, estimated worthy of 32.3 billion yuan. In 2017, the analyzed data of Shantou GDP is approximately 230 billion yuan(US$35.4 billion).

=== Development zone ===
With an area of 2.34 km^{2} (0.90 sq mi), Shantou Free Trade Zone lies at the south part of Shantou city. It was ratified by the State Council of the People's Republic of China and founded in January 1993, and it formally came into use on December of the same year after its supervision installations were checked and accepted by the General Administration of Customs. It has been comprehensively developing export processing, storage, international trade, finance and information industry. Its goal is to establish a modernized international zone that is open to overseas by drawing experience from international free trade zones.

== Demographics ==
Shantou is one of the most densely populated regions in China. Former Chaoyang City was China's most populous county-level administrative region, with 2.4 million inhabitants. Shantou has direct jurisdiction over six districts and one county, and the six urban districts of Shantou have a population of 5,330,764.

=== Metro area ===
With it and the surrounding cities of Jieyang and Chaozhou, the administrative metropolitan area known as Chaoshan covers an area of 10,404 km^{2} (4,017 sq mi), and had a permanent population of 13,648,232 as of the 2020 census. Nevertheless, its built-up area spread on 11 districts, Puning city and Raoping county was home to 12,543,024 inhabitants as of 2020 census. This is de facto the fifth built-up area of China after Guangzhou-Shenzhen Pearl River Delta megacity, Shanghai-Suzhou-Wuxi-Changzhou conurbation, Beijing and Hangzhou-Shaoxing agglomeration.

=== Languages ===
Most residents are linguistically Teochew people. Teochew is a variant of Southern Min (Hokkien-Taiwanese) spoken in the neighbouring Southern Fujian and Taiwan. There are also Hakka, popularly known as Half-Hakka (半山客), living mainly in Chaoyang District and Chaonan District, although they speak Teochew on a daily basis and practise Teochew culture. The Mandarin-medium education system, widely promoted throughout China, has made most people, especially younger generations, speak Mandarin fluently. Cantonese language TV and labor migrations to the Pearl River Delta has also made Cantonese widely spoken as a third language by the younger generations.

Governmental statistics show that 2.16 million overseas Chinese have roots in Shantou, with significant populations of Teochew people residing in Thailand and Cambodia, which constitute a majority of Thai Chinese and a majority of Chinese Cambodians. This is demonstrated by the unusually high number of international direct flights between Bangkok and Shantou. In addition, there are at least two Teochew-speaking air hostesses on board each China Southern flight between Shantou and Bangkok. The Teochew presence, furthermore, is evident in Singapore and Malaysia; Johor Bahru, a coastal city situated at the latter's southernmost tip, is known as 'Little Swatow', due to the majority local Chinese populace is dominantly Teochew and as well as the second largest group of the local Chinese population in Singapore.

== Culture and lifestyle ==
Shantou people share the same culture with other Teochew. The tea-drinking tradition widely practised in town is a classic instance. According to China Daily, Shantou people "drink more tea than anyone else in China, in total 700 million yuan (US$87.5 million) each year".

== Religions ==
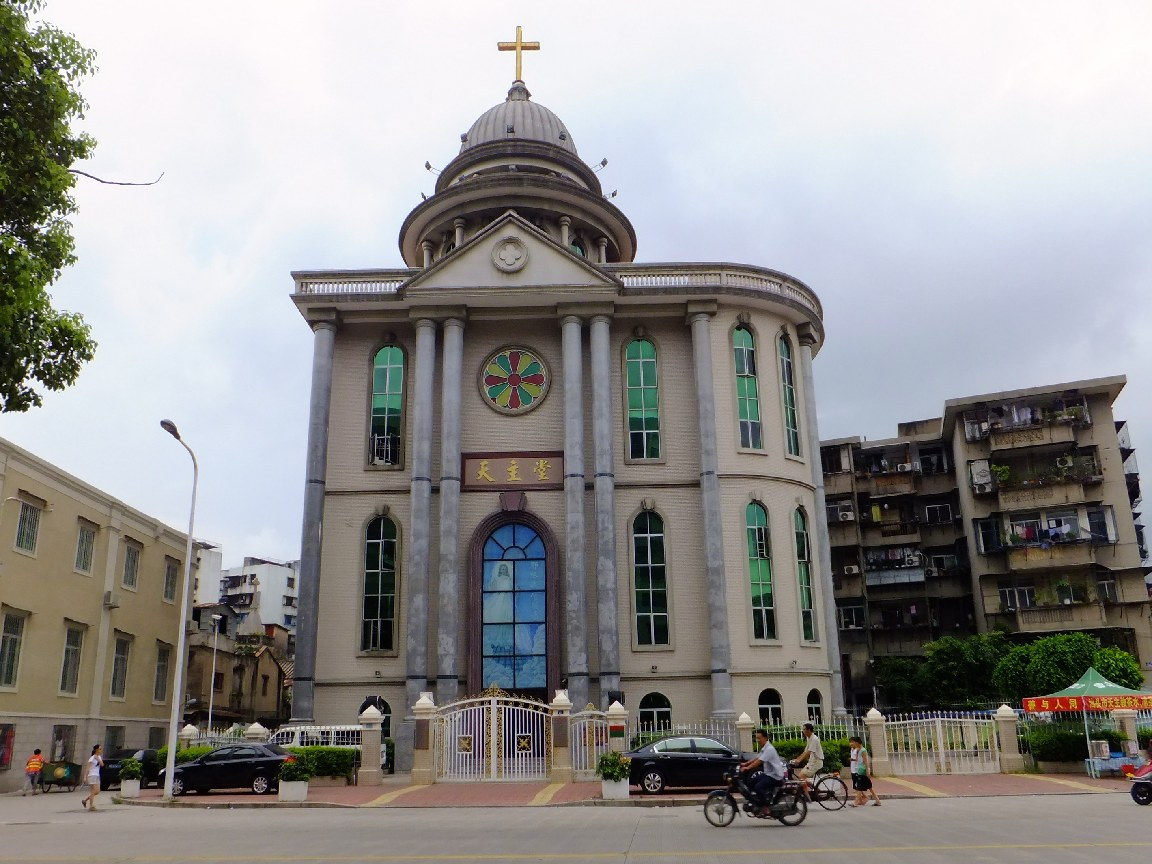
St. Joseph's Cathedral of Shantou

Most of the population in Shantou is non-religious or practices traditional folk religions, Buddhism, Taoism, or worship of Chinese deities and ancestors. About 2% of the population belongs to an organised religion, with 40,000 Protestants, 20,000 Catholics and 500 Muslims. Saint Joseph's Cathedral (Shantou) is the cathedral of the Roman Catholic Diocese of Shantou.

== Infrastructure ==
=== Health ===
The public hospitals in the Shantou metropolitan area are operated by the Government of Shantou. Management of these hospitals and other specialist health facilities are coordinated by Shantou Board of Health.

=== Utilities ===
Shantou's electricity is provided entirely by China Southern Power Grid, postal service operated by China Post.

=== Telecommunications ===
Shantou is one of the most important international telecommunications ports in China. Four international submarine communications cables land at Shantou submarine cable landing station, including APCN 2, China-US Cable Network, SMW3 and South-East Asia Japan Cable System (SJC).

China Telecom, China Unicom and China Mobile provide fixed lines, broadband internet access and mobile telecommunications services there.

=== Transport ===
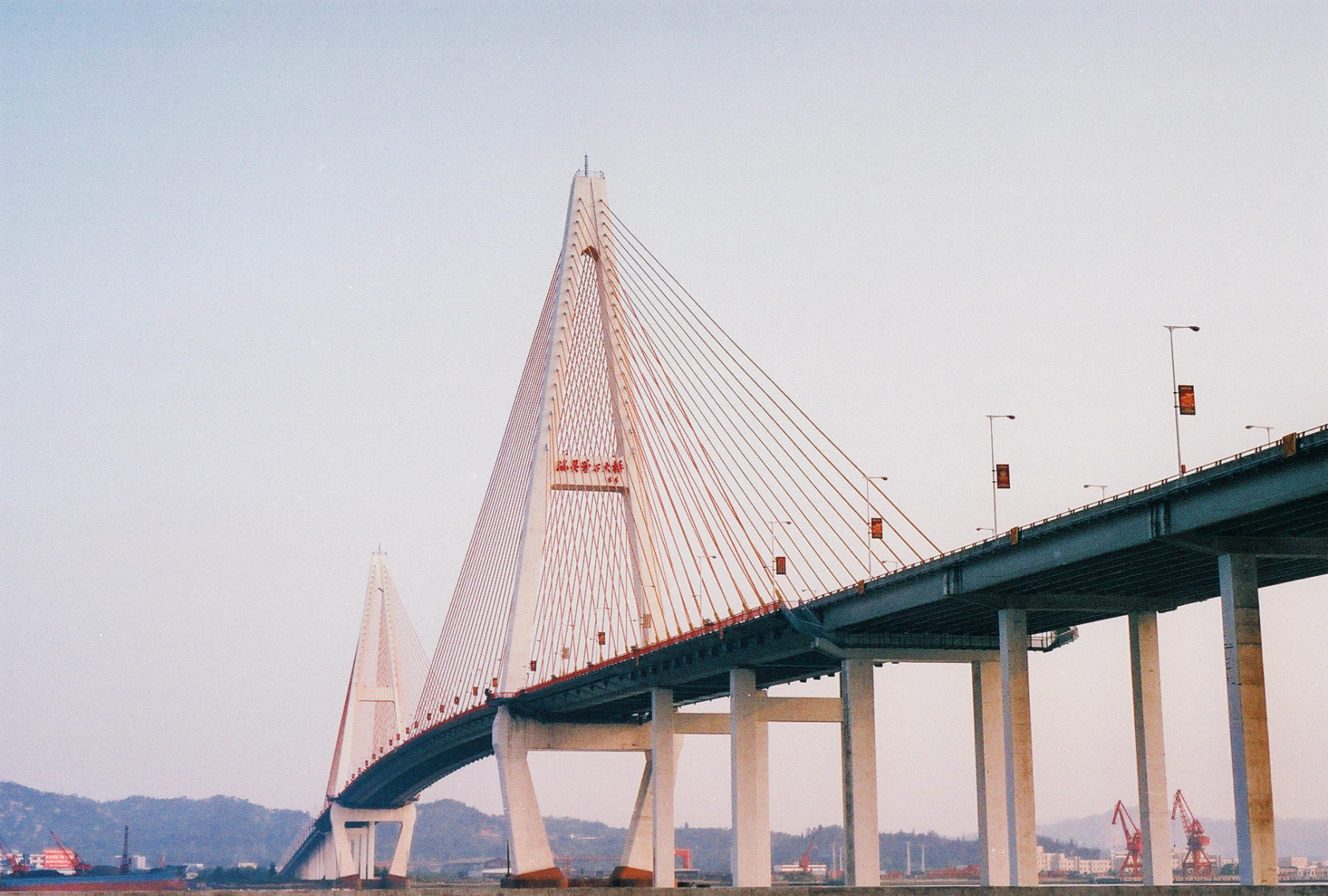
Shantou Queshi Bridge during sunset

==== Urban transport ====
Public transportation is provided by bus, ferry, bike sharing system and taxi. Residents also travel by private car and motorbikes. There are two bridges throughout the city that cross the Shantou Harbor: the Queshi Bridge and Shantou Bay Bridge. A metro system is planned with construction of three lines (Lines 1, 2, and 3) commencing in 2018 and opening of the system planned in 2020.

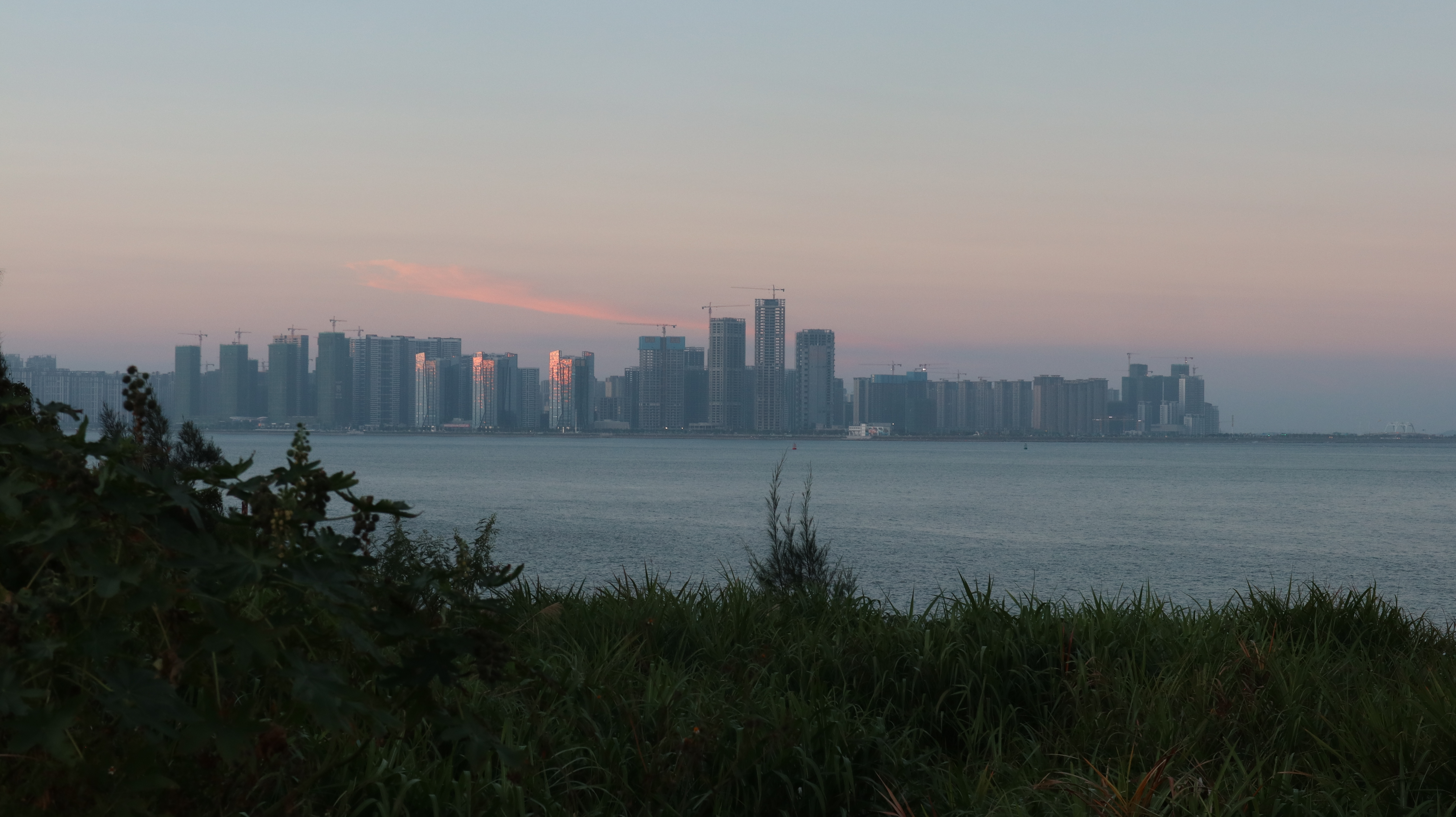
The new CBD of Shantou on the east coast, facing the Taiwan strait, as viewed from Dahao Island.

==== Air ====
Shantou previously had its own civil airport, Shantou Waisha Airport. It was formerly the main airport serving the Shantou until nearby Jieyang Chaoshan Airport was opened on 15 December 2011. Shantou Waisha Airport became a military airbase since then and all civilian flights were transferred to the newly built airport in Jieyang. Taxi is the usual way to travel between the airport and the city proper. The taxi fare is around 60 RMB. Airport-Downtown Shantou shuttle charter is also suggested. Based in Shantou, Shantou Airlines Co. operated by China Southern Airlines has a 15 aircraft fleet in service.

==== Railways ====
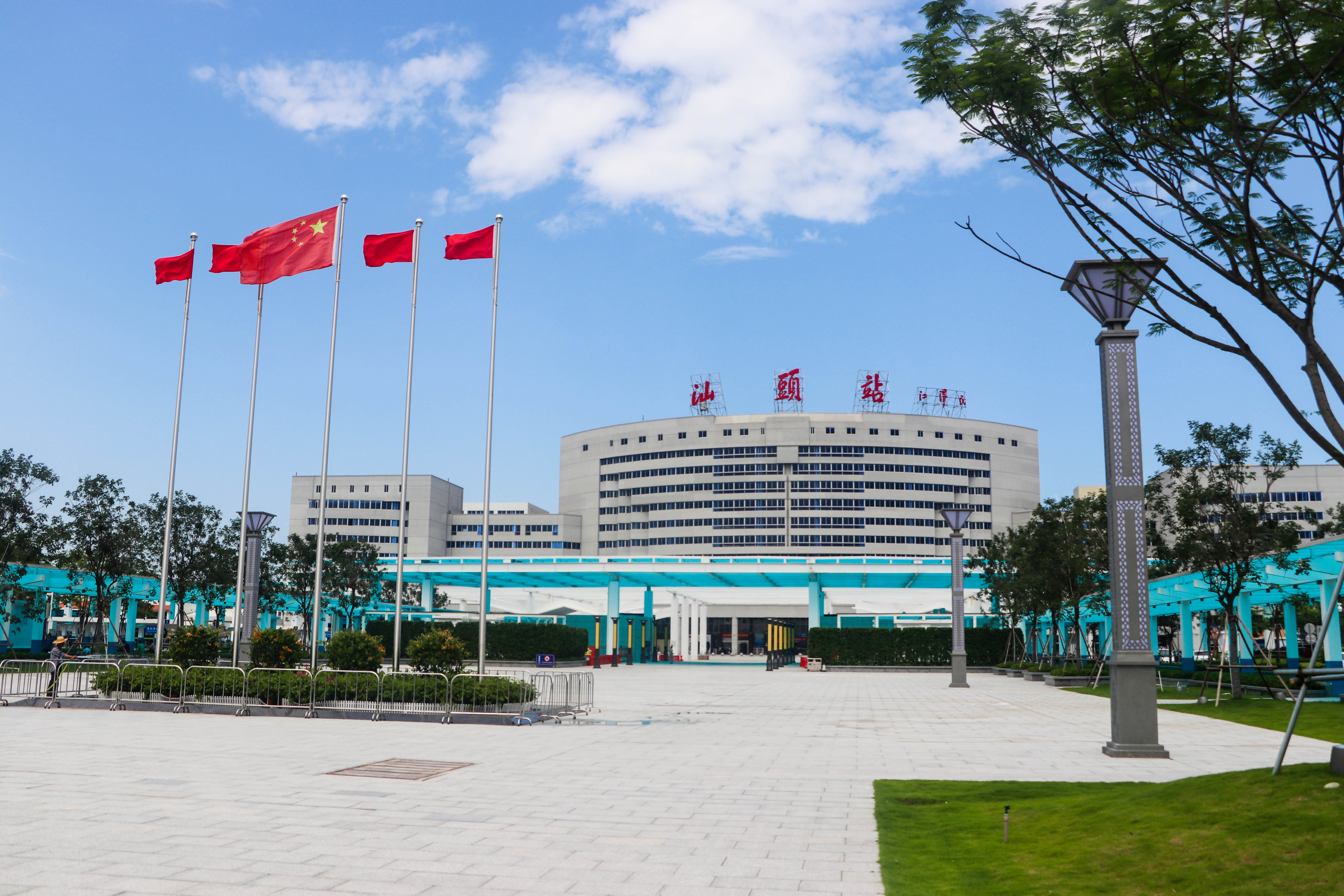
Shantou Railway Station, 2019

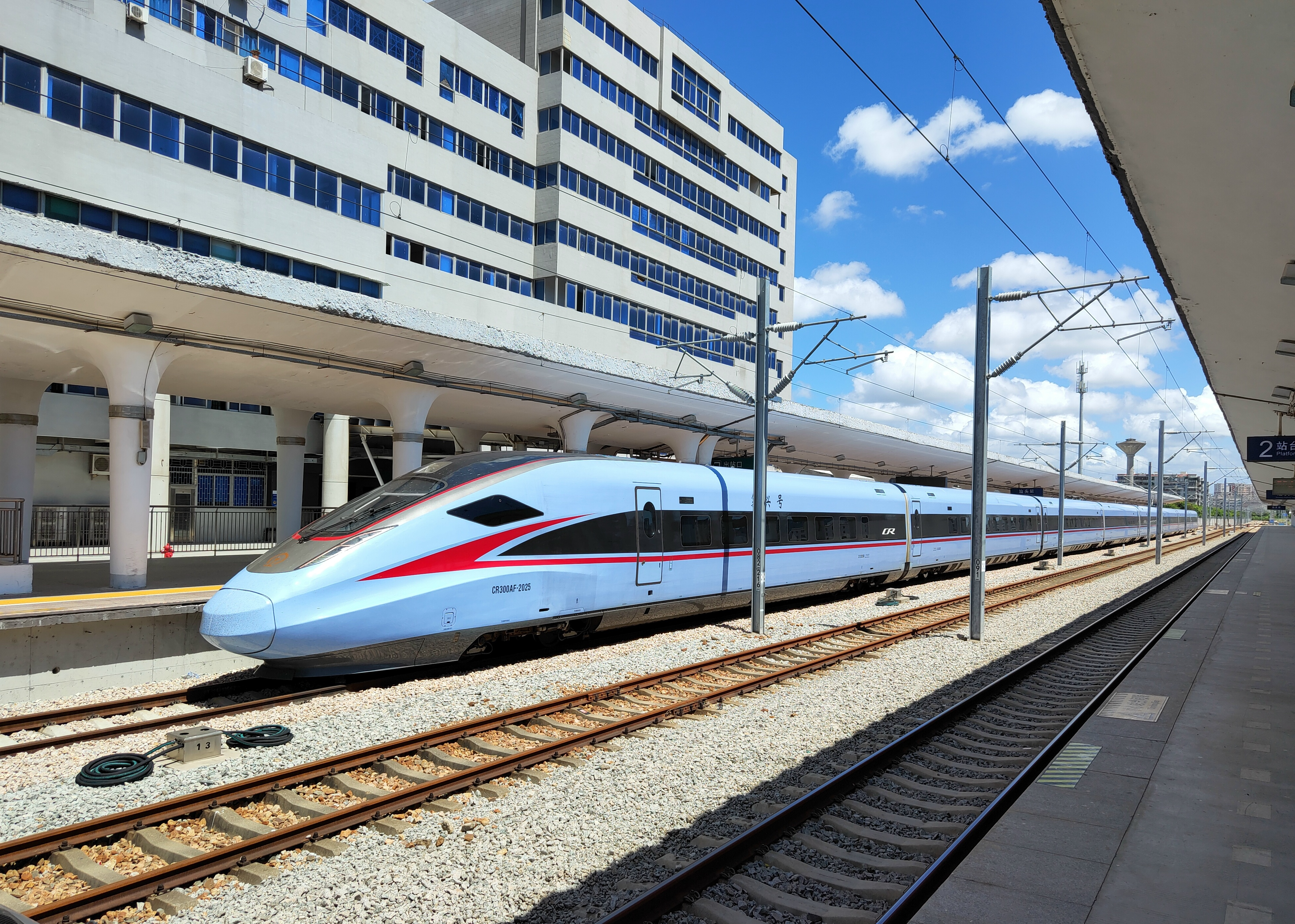
A high-speed train leaving Shantou for Guangzhou, 2022

There are three railway stations which serve Shantou: Chaoshan Railway Station and Chaoyang railway station which lie on the Xiamen-Shenzhen Railway line, and Shantou Railway Station which lies on the Guangzhou–Meizhou–Shantou Railway and is under construction for the Guangzhou-Shanwei-Shantou 350 km/h high speed railway.

== Tourism attractions ==
- Shantou Times Square light show (19:00-21:00 on Friday and weekend)
- Shipaotai Park (Chinese: 石炮台公园; pinyin: Shí pàotái gōngyuán)
- Chen Cihong's Former Residence (陈慈黉故居; Chén Cíhóng gùjū)
- Nan'ao Island, rated as Guangdong's most beautiful island by China's National Geographic magazine
- Palace-Temple of Old Mother (老妈宫; Lǎo Mā gōng): dedicated to Mazu, Goddess of Sea
- Temple of Emperor Guan (关帝庙; Guān Dì miào): dedicated to Lord Guan
- Tropic of Cancer Symbol Tower (北回归线标志塔; Běihuíguīxiàn biāozhìtǎ): The Tropic of Cancer slips through Centipede Mountain, which is 20 kilometers away from the city properly.
- Shantou Museum (汕头博物馆; Shàntóu bówùguǎn): An art museum.
- Shantou Founding Museum (汕头开埠博物馆; Shàntóu kāibù bówùguǎn): This history museum is devoted to the establishment of Swatow (Shantou) as a treaty port in the 19th century, not to be confused with Shantou Museum.
- Old town of Swatow and Dr. Sun Yat-sen memorial pavilion (汕头老市区和中山纪念亭; Shàntóu lǎo shìqū hé Zhōngshān jìniàntíng)
- Chaoshan Historical and Cultural Exhibition Center 潮汕历史文化博览中心 is a museum includes four major exhibition areas: Chaoshan cultural relics exhibition area, Chaoshan folk customs exhibition area, overseas Chinese cultural exhibition area, and calligraphy and painting art exhibition area.
- East Coast Avenue (东海岸大道; Dōng hǎi'àn Dàdào) The new urban area of Shantou, a long seaside promenade
- Golden Coast (中海黄金海岸; Zhong hai huang jin hai an)

The Shantou Cultural Revolution Museum (文革博物馆; Wéngé bówùguǎn) was the country's only museum dedicated to the Cultural Revolution. It closed in 2016.

== Media ==
In 1912 Swatow had four newspapers, all in Chinese. They were Han Chao Pao, Ming Chuan (People's Rights), Ta Fung Pao (The Typhoon), and Ta Tung Pao (Eastern Times). In 2018, Shantou Metropolis Daily Post and Shantou Special Economic Zone Evening News both stopped their traditional newspaper business and transform into e-newspaper newspapers. Meanwhile, the Shantou Daily (Municipal) keep providing both newspaper service and e-newspaper service for Shantou citizens and other readers.

== Education ==
Education is overseen provincewide by the Guangdong Education Bureau.

=== Primary and secondary ===
Shantou has a host of well-known schools:

- Shantou Jinshan Middle School
- Shantou Number One Middle School
- Shantou Experimental School
- Shantou Yuhuai Senior High School

=== Colleges and universities ===
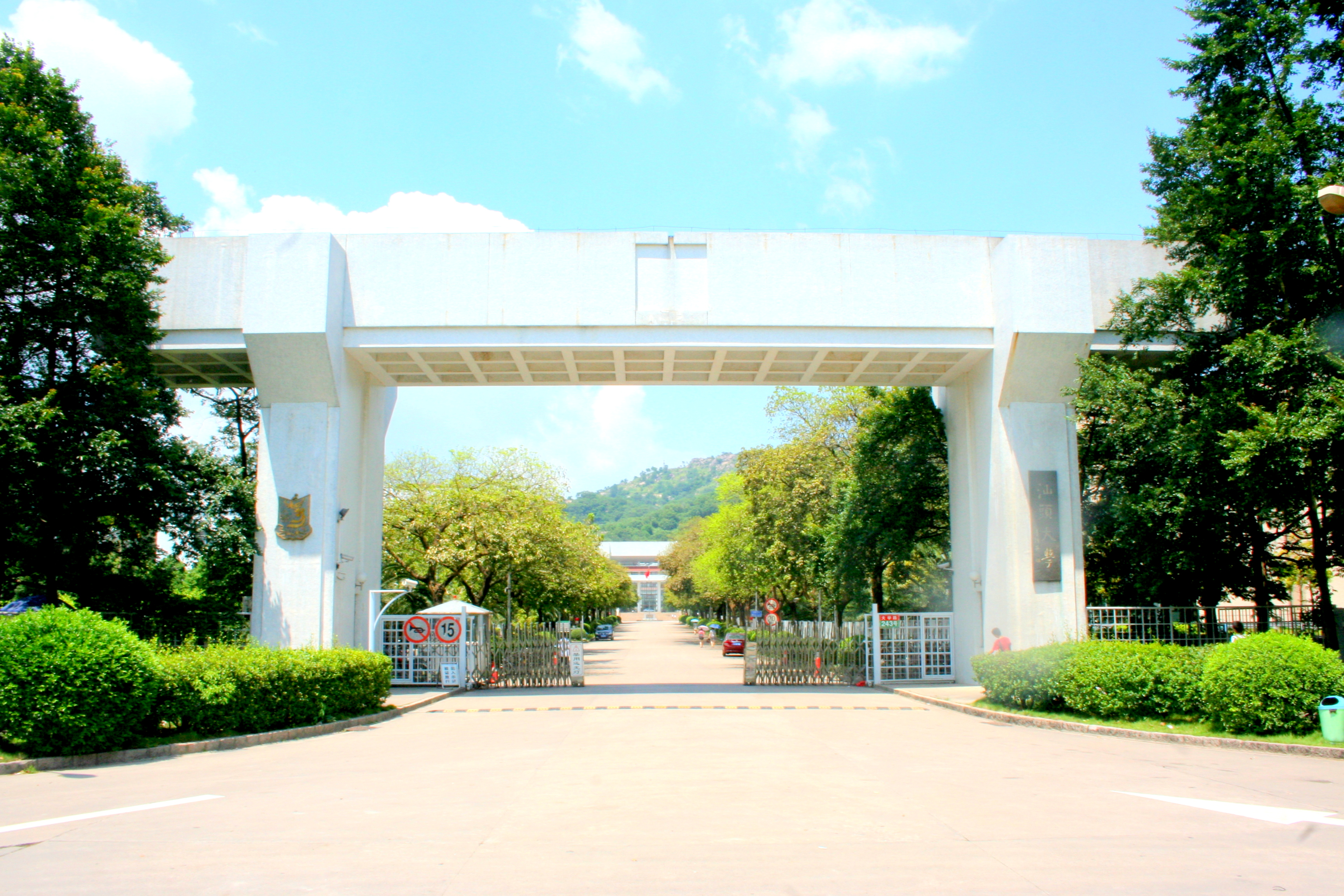
Entrance gate to Shantou University

- Shantou University (STU)
- Guangdong Technion-Israel Institute of Technology (GTIIT)
- South China University of Technology Shantou College
- Shantou Polytechnic
- Shantou Radio and TV University

== Sports ==
- Haibin Stadium (Jinping District)
- Zhengda Stadium (Longhu District)
- Shantou Natatorium and Diving Stadium (Haojiang District)
- Youngsters Soccer Court of Shantou Times Square (Downtown)
- Fitness square and tennis courts of Xinghu Park (Longhu District)
- Shantou Citic Golf Club(27Holes) (Haojiang District)
- Shantou Jinfeng Sports Park(Including golf course, basketball fields and soccer courts)(Longhu District)

== Twin towns – sister cities ==
Shantou is twinned with:

- Cần Thơ, Vietnam (2005)
- Haifa, Israel (2015)
- Kishiwada, Japan (1990)
- Saint John, New Brunswick, Canada (1997)

=== Friendly cities ===
Shantou has friendly relations with:

- Bangkok, Thailand (2000)
- Durrës, Albania (2015)
- Fairfield, Australia (2005)
- Federal Way, United States (2013)
- Johor Bahru, Malaysia (2011)
- Khabarovsk, Russia (2019)
- Leiria, Portugal (2018)
- Libreville, Gabon (2015)
- Puntarenas, Costa Rica (2014)
- Pyeongtaek, South Korea (2003)
- Phnom Penh, Cambodia (2024)

== Notable people ==
Many notable Chinese come from Shantou or their ancestral home is Shantou.

=== Entrepreneurs ===
- Mainland China
  - Huang Guangyu (1969–), Chairman of Gome Group and once the richest persons in Mainland China
  - Ma Huateng (1971–), Founder of Tencent Computer System Co., Ltd and creator of QQ
  - Ji Haipeng, Chairman and Chief Executive Officer of Logan Property Holdings Co, Ltd.
  - Yang Zhilin, Co-founder of Moonshot AI
  - Yao Zhenhua, the chairman of Baoneng Group, China's fourth-richest man as of January 2017
  - Xie Jian, the chairman of Leyu Bricks
- Cambodia
  - Pung Kheav Se (1948–), Chairman and Founder of Canadia Group, one of Cambodia's largest business conglomerates.
- Thailand
  - Low Kiok Chiang (1843–1911), founder of Khiam Hoa Heng entreprises (1872-1950s)
  - Dhanin Chearavanont (1939–), Senior Chairman of CP Group, Thailand's largest private company and Forbes ranked.
- Hong Kong
  - Sir Li Ka-shing GBM KBE JP (1928–; Chaozhou), tycoon, the chairman of the board for CK Hutchison Holdings.
  - Lim Por-yen (1914–2005), media tycoon, banker and charitarian
- Singapore
  - Tang Choon Keng (1901–2000), founder of Tangs

=== Entertainment ===
- Hong Kong born
  - Emil Chau (1960–) actor and singer
  - Kwong Wah (1962–), actor and singer
  - Canti Lau (1964–) actor and singer
  - Sammi Cheng (1972–) actress and singer
  - Kent Cheng (1951-), actor
- Mainland China
  - Cai Chusheng (1906–1968), director, and his film Song of the Fisherman (渔光曲) received the first international film prize in China's history

=== Other ===
- King Taksin (Zheng Xin) (1734–1782), Thailand King from 1767 to 1782
- Hsu Shu-hsi (1892–1982), Chinese diplomat
- Nuon Chea (1926–2018), Cambodian politician
- Wu Nansheng (1922-2018), former Secretary of Guangdong Provincial Party Committee
- Adele M. Fielde (1839–1916), missionary and author
- Qin Mu (1919–1992), writer
- Watchman Nee (1903–1972), theologian, and opponent of prosperity theology
- Tan Howe Liang (1933–), Singaporean weightlifting Olympian
- Chua Soi Lek (1947–), Malaysian politician and former President of MCA
- Xu Shilin (1998–), Chinese tennis player, Junior Olympic gold medallist
- Shing-Tung Yau (1949–), American mathematician, winner of the 1982 Fields Medal, the William Caspar Graustein Professor of Mathematics at Harvard University
- Hao Huang, Chinese mathematician, solver of Sensitivity Conjecture and Assistant Professor at Emory University

== See also ==
- Chaoshan
- Chaozhou
- Teochew people
- Chaoshan culture
