= Chaoyang =

Chaoyang (pinyin: Cháoyáng) may refer to the following:

- Chaoyang, Cili (朝阳乡), Zhangjiajie, Hunan Province
- Chaoyang, Fujian (朝阳镇), Zhangzhou, Fujian
- Chaoyang, Liaoning (朝阳市), prefecture-level city
  - Chaoyang County (朝阳县), division of Chaoyang City, Liaoning
- Chaoyang District (disambiguation) (朝阳区 / 潮阳区)
- Chaoyang railway station (disambiguation) (潮阳站)
- Chaoyang Subdistrict (disambiguation), for all such named subdistricts of cities
- Chaoyang Town (disambiguation), for all such named towns
- Chaoyang Township (disambiguation), for all such named townships
- Chaoyang University of Technology (朝陽科技大學), Taichung County, Taiwan

== See also ==
- Yang Chao (disambiguation) or Chao Yang
