= Chaoshan =

Place in China

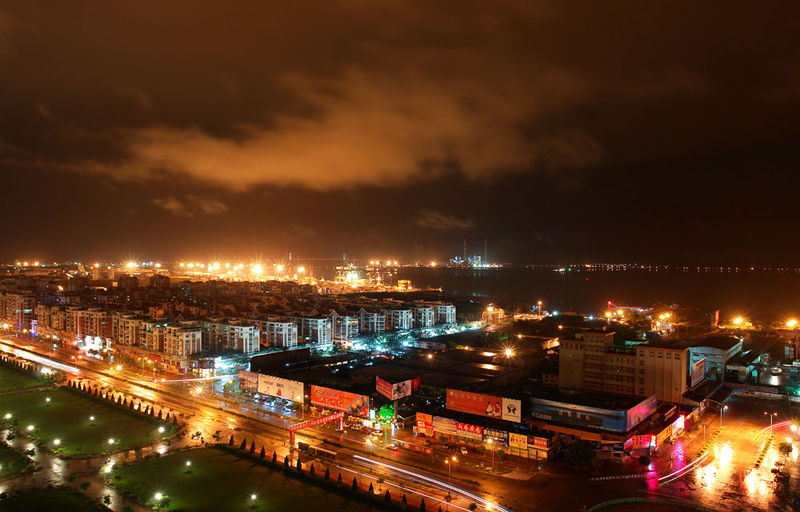
Shantou harbor.

Chaoshan or Teoswa (Chinese: 潮汕; pinyin: Cháoshàn; Peng'im: Dio^{5} suan^{1} [ti̯o˥˥˩˩.sũ̯ã˧˧] / Diê^{5} suan^{1} [ti̯e˥˥˩˩.sũ̯ã˧˧]) is a cultural-linguistic region in the east of Guangdong, China. It comprises the cities of Chaozhou, Jieyang and Shantou.

== Overview ==
=== Brief History ===
During the Qin dynasty, the area was administered as Jieyang County (揭阳县) under Nanhai Commandery. The first commandery-level administration specific to the region, Yi'an Commandery (义安郡), was established later in the Jin dynasty. Under the Sui dynasty, Yi'an Commandery was reorganized and renamed Chaozhou (潮州), a designation that persisted through subsequent dynasties.

=== Languages ===
The region's predominant language is Teochew (Chaoshan dialect), a variety of Southern Min, while Hakka is spoken in parts of the inland areas.

Younger generations in the region are usually proficient in both Mandarin Chinese and Chaoshan dialect or Hakka. Even though the use of Mandarin Chinese has slowly grown in the region since the beginning of "the promotion of Standard Chinese" in China in the late 1990s, the major language used in daily life is still the Chaoshan dialect.

=== Diaspora ===
Nowadays, the Teochew people are mainly spread over Guangdong, Hong Kong, Macao, and Taiwan. It is also historically important as the ancestral homeland of many citizens of other countries of Chinese descent, as they have emigrated and established communities in Thailand, Malaysia, Cambodia, Vietnam, Singapore, France, the United States, Canada, New Zealand, Indonesia, and other countries and coastal areas.

The Teochew Letters, which have been admitted into the Asia/Pacific Regional Memory of the World (MOW) Register, were family correspondence and remittance sent by Teochew immigrants in Southeast Asia to their families living in Chaoshan.

== Etymology of "Chaoshan" ==
The name Chaoshan (潮汕) is a contraction of the region’s two principal prefecture‑level cities: Chaozhou (潮州) and Shantou (汕头). The term first appeared in 1904 with the construction of the Chao Chow and Swatow Railway, which linked the two urban centers. Over time, Chaoshan came to refer collectively to the three prefecture‑level cities of Chaozhou, Shantou, and Jieyang.

Today, Chaoshan has grown into a single, densely built metropolitan area—one of the most densely populated in China.

== Modern Times ==
The Chaoshan region encompasses the cities of Chaozhou, Jieyang, and Shantou. It is Guangdong's second largest metropolitan area, after the Guangzhou-centered Pearl River Delta. It had a permanent population of 13,937,897 at the end of 2010, and covered an area of 10,415 km^{2} (4,021 sq mi) when it was united under the Shantou district that stretched from Jieyang on the coast to the southern border of Fujian. In 2024, the area was estimated at 11,119 km^{2} (4,293 sq mi). Despite its lack of official status, the United Nations Department of Economic and Social Affairs (UNDESA), Demographia,, Global Human Settlement Layer, and OECD all consider Chaoshan as an urban area, with all except UNDESA enumerating the region as a megacity.

In March 2013, a proposal to merge Chaozhou, Jieyang, and Shantou into sub-provincial cities in Guangdong Province was submitted to the National People's Congress. Chen Jingwei, a member of the CPPCC National Committee and vice-chairman of the Federation of Chinese Industry and Commerce, submitted the proposal again in March 2014.

On 20 December 2023 the Guangdong Provincial People's Government released the "Shantou-Chaozhou-Jieyang Metropolitan Area Development Plan".

City	Romanization	Population (2020)	Image	Information	City Map
Shantou 汕头	Pinyin: Shàntóu; Peng'im: Suan1-tao5	5,502,031		Shantou is the main city of the Chaoshan region. It is a port on the South China Sea, and is one of China's Special Economic Zones. Districts: Jinping, Longhu, Haojiang, Chaoyang, Chaonan, Chenghai; County: Nan'ao; New Area: Haiwan	
Jieyang 揭阳	Pinyin: Jiēyáng; Peng'im: Gig4-ion5	5,577,814		Jieyang is the most populous city in the region. It is one of the fastest-growing cities in terms of population. Districts: Rongcheng, Jiedong; Counties: Jiexi, Huilai; County-level City: Puning	
Chaozhou 潮州	Pinyin: Cháozhōu; Peng'im: Dio5-ziu1	2,568,387		Chaozhou is the smallest of the three cities in the Chaoshan region. It is an old town with a large historic and cultural value, which is now undergoing urbanisation. Districts: Xiangqiao, Chao'an; County: Raoping	

== Geography ==
Chaoshan is located in the east of Guangdong; it is bordered by Zhangzhou to its northeast and Meizhou in the northwest. The region has varying elevations, with highlands in northwest Chaoshan and low-lying deltas in the south and southeast. Two of the most notable mountain ranges in the northwest are the Phoenix Mountain Range (Teochew: hong6 huang5 suan1; simplified Chinese: 凤凰山; traditional Chinese: 鳳凰山; pinyin: Fènghuáng shān) and the Lotus Mountain Range (simplified Chinese: 莲花山脉; traditional Chinese: 蓮花山脈; pinyin: Liánhuā shānmài). Another famous mountain is the Sangpu Mountain located at the junction of Shantou, Chaozhou and Jieyang 3 prefecture-level cities. The region's flat terrain is served by three rivers and their tributaries: the Han River (Chinese: 韩江), the Rong River (Chinese: 榕江), and the Lian River (Chinese: 练江).

Chaoshan has a long coastline with many ports, reaching a total length of more than 325.6 kilometres (202.3 mi). Its coastline spreads southwest from Raoping County and is detailed by bays, inlets, and islands; the largest island being Nan'ao Island.

== Economy ==
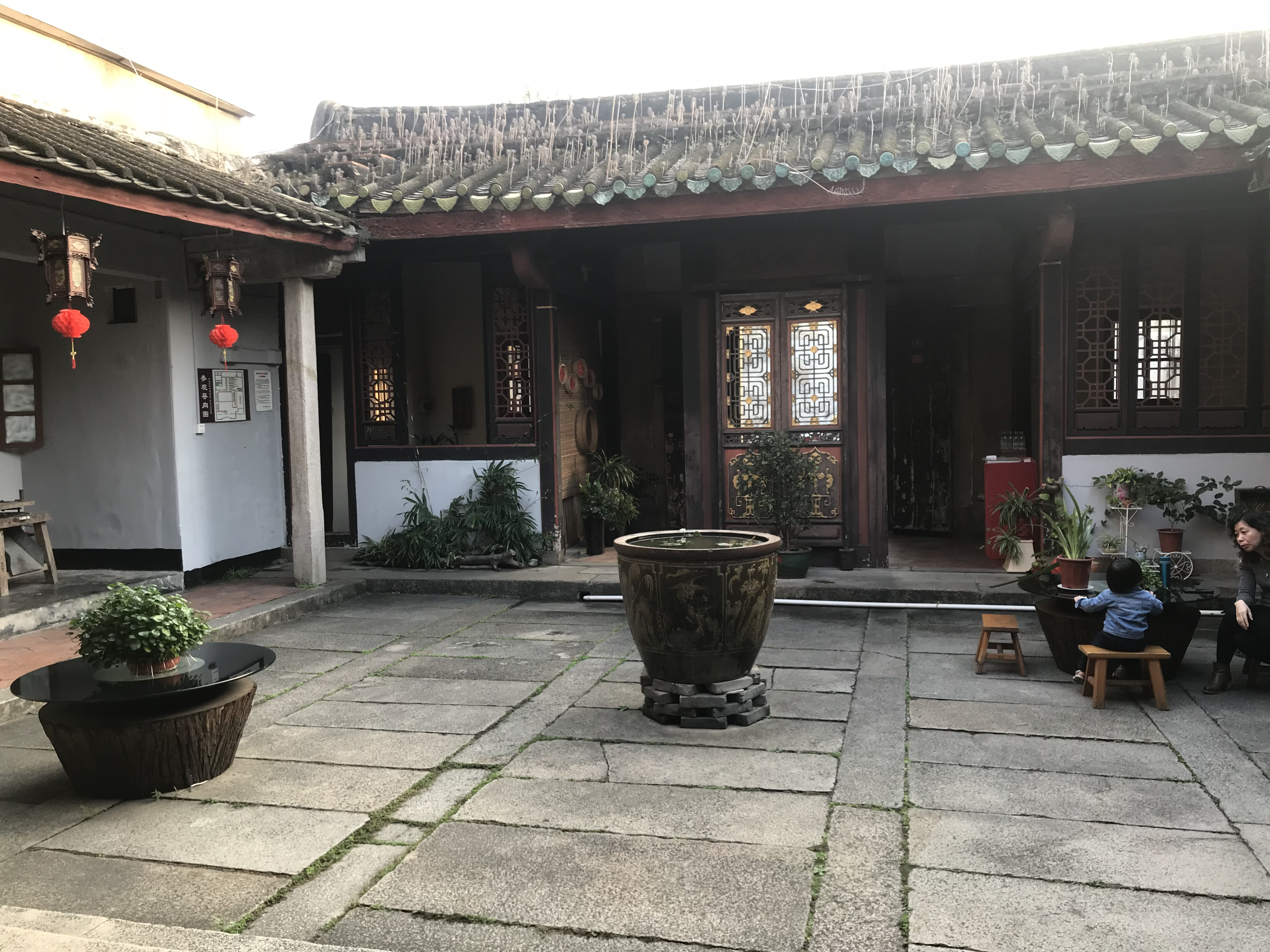
Traditional courtyard mansion in Chaozhou.

The Chaoshan region, despite having the second largest economy in Guangdong after the Pearl River Delta (PRD), is still considered quite economically small in comparison to the PRD's economy. Although the growth of the area's GDP stagnated in the late 1990s during the 1997 Asian financial crisis, it has experienced regional economic growth and a steady increase in GDP. Li Ka-shing has also invested heavily in the education and healthcare of the region, recognizing its potential for growth; in 2023, he donated RMB 100 million to support the construction of a new inpatient building of the Chaozhou People's Hospital.

There have been proposals to the Chinese government to amalgamate the region into one Special Economic Zone, as the split of the region into three cities (Chaozhou, Jieyang, and Shantou) in 1991 greatly slowed the level of economic growth in the region; in 2012, the per capita GDP of Shantou reached only US$4,250, whereas the province's total GDP per capita was US$8,600. During the period 2007–2012, there was only a 10% growth in GDP, whereas the average economic growth in the whole province was around 15%. In 2007, the total GDP of the four cities in eastern Guangdong was 210.748 billion yuan, accounting for 6.56% of the total GDP of the Province.

In 2023, the total GDP of Guangdong province was 13.57 trillion yuan while the GDP of Shantou, one of the first four special economic zones opened to the outside world, was only 315.83 billion yuan (2.33% of the Province's GDP), ranked 11th of the 21 cities in the Guangdong province; the GDP of Jieyang was 244.50 billion yuan (1.80% of the Province's GDP), ranked 13th; and the GDP of Chaozhou was 135.66 billion yuan (1.00% of the Province's GDP), ranked 19th.

=== Energy ===
The area contains two coal-fired power plants with 1000 megawatt or greater outputs: Shantou Power Station (1200MW) and Huilai Power Station (3200MW).

Chaoshan is home to many active wind farms, including the Nan'ao Wind Farm complex on Nan'ao Island in Shantou, which is the largest island wind farm in Asia; and the Shibeishan Wind Farm in Huilai County. There are also multiple planned wind farm complexes set to start construction in 2024–2025, the most notable being Chaozhou's planned offshore wind farm in the Taiwan Strait (set to be a 43.3 gigawatt facility) and the planned Guangdong Jieyang Huilai wind farm (which has five separate projects).

There are also plans to build a nuclear power plant in Jieyang, although the date by which construction will start has yet to be determined.

== Culture and language ==
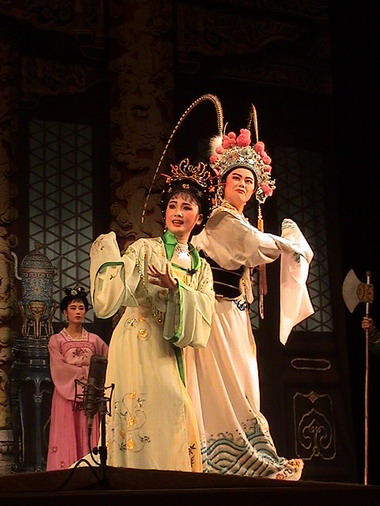
Teochew Opera

Chaoshan has a culture that is distinct from its neighbors in Guangdong and the rest of China. It does, however, share similarities to the Minnan areas just north of Chaoshan in Fujian province. One of the main reasons is its language, the Chaoshan or Swatow dialect. This variant of Chinese has eight tones compared to the six tones found in Cantonese and the four to five tones found in Mandarin, which makes it one of the most difficult variants to master. Music, opera and Chaozhou cuisine are further characteristics that distinguish Chaoshan people from the rest of Guangdong.

The Chaoshan dialect (潮州話/潮汕話) of Min is considered one of the more conservative Chinese dialects, as it preserves features from ancient Chinese that have been lost in some of the other modern dialects of Chinese. Locals claim Chaoshan dialect is one of the oldest in China. It is spoken by about 15 million people in Chaoshan and approximately two to five million overseas.

Chaozhou opera (潮劇) is a traditional art form that has a history of more than 500 years, and it has been performed in over 20 countries and regions. Based on the local folk dances and ballads, Chaozhou opera has formed its own style under the influence of Nanxi opera. Nanxi is one of the oldest Chinese operas that originated in the Song dynasty. The old form of choral accompaniment still retains its special features. Clowns and females are the most distinctive characters in a Chaozhou opera, and fan-playing and acrobatic skills are more prominent than in other types of performances.

Gongfu tea (工夫茶), the "espresso" of Chinese teas with a formidable kick, which was first consumed back in the Song dynasty, is still flourishing and remains an important part of social etiquette in Chaozhou.

At the local teahouse, tea service is often accompanied by Chaozhou music (潮州音樂). Chaozhou string music, the gong and drum music, flute music are the traditional musical forms of Chaozhou music. Chaozhou string music is made up of mostly plucked and bowed string instruments, and on some occasions, wind instruments are used. The most characteristic instruments are the erxian (or touxian) (二弦，頭弦), tihu (提胡) and yehu (all two-stringed bowed lutes), the sanxian, pipa, ruan, guzheng, and yangqin. The number of instruments and performers in the ensemble is flexible and depends on the availability of instruments and musicians to play them - but for an even and balanced texture only one of each instrument is preferred. Chaozhou drum music includes the big drum and gong, the small drum and gong, the dizi set drum and dong and su drum and gong ensembles. The current Chaozhou drum music is said to be similar to the form of the Drum and Wind Music of the Han and Tang dynasties. Chaozhou guzheng (潮州古筝) is also a major genre of Southern style Chinese guzheng.

== Chaoshan cuisine ==
Chaoshan cuisine, also known as Chiuchow cuisine, Chaozhou cuisine or Teochew cuisine, originated from the Chaoshan region in the eastern part of China's Guangdong Province, which includes the cities of Chaozhou, Shantou and Jieyang. Relative economic and linguistic isolation (most people also speak Mandarin) has helped maintain the Chaoshan area's local traditions, which has turned into a boon for foodies.

Chaoshan cuisine, similar to Cantonese cooking, is characterized by the use of ingredients such as fresh seafood, poultry, galangal, Chinese basil, and vegetables. Chaoshan dishes taste fresh, light and natural. There are also unique local sauces such as pruning soy sauce, Shantou sweet and spicy sauce, garlic white vinegar sauce, and fermented fish sauce. Salty, spicy, sweet or sour, each has its own outstanding flavor. Teochew (also Chaoshan or Chiu Chow or Chaozhou) cooking focuses on restraint and subtlety and avoids heavy seasonings to highlight the freshness of ingredients. The ingredients of Chaoshan dishes usually include white olives, rice noodles, or mandarin oranges. These ingredients often come from the sea in Chaoshan, a hundred miles up the coast from Hong Kong.

The cooking methods of Chaoshan dishes are diversified, including brining, deep-frying, pan-frying, braising, alive marinating, stewing, roasting, smoking, steam stewing, dressing, etc. The most used method among these is brining. Chaoshan brined meat is the signature dish in Chaoshan cuisine. Meat is brined together with rich flavors. Local dishes also use marinated raw seafood, such as colorful flower crabs steeped in a bath of vinegar, salt, chilis and cilantro. The seafood cooked in this way is extremely umami.

Chaoshan has a rich history of farming and drying seaweed, which Westerners might instinctively associate with Korean and Japanese cooking. The ancient Teochew tradition of preparing thinly sliced raw fish was later exported to Japan, becoming known as sashimi.

The most famous culinary method in Chaoshan is marinated broth stew, where poultry (especially local geese) and other meat are slow-cooked in a highly flavored broth. This is different from Cantonese food, in which barbecued meat is arguably one of the most representative dishes.

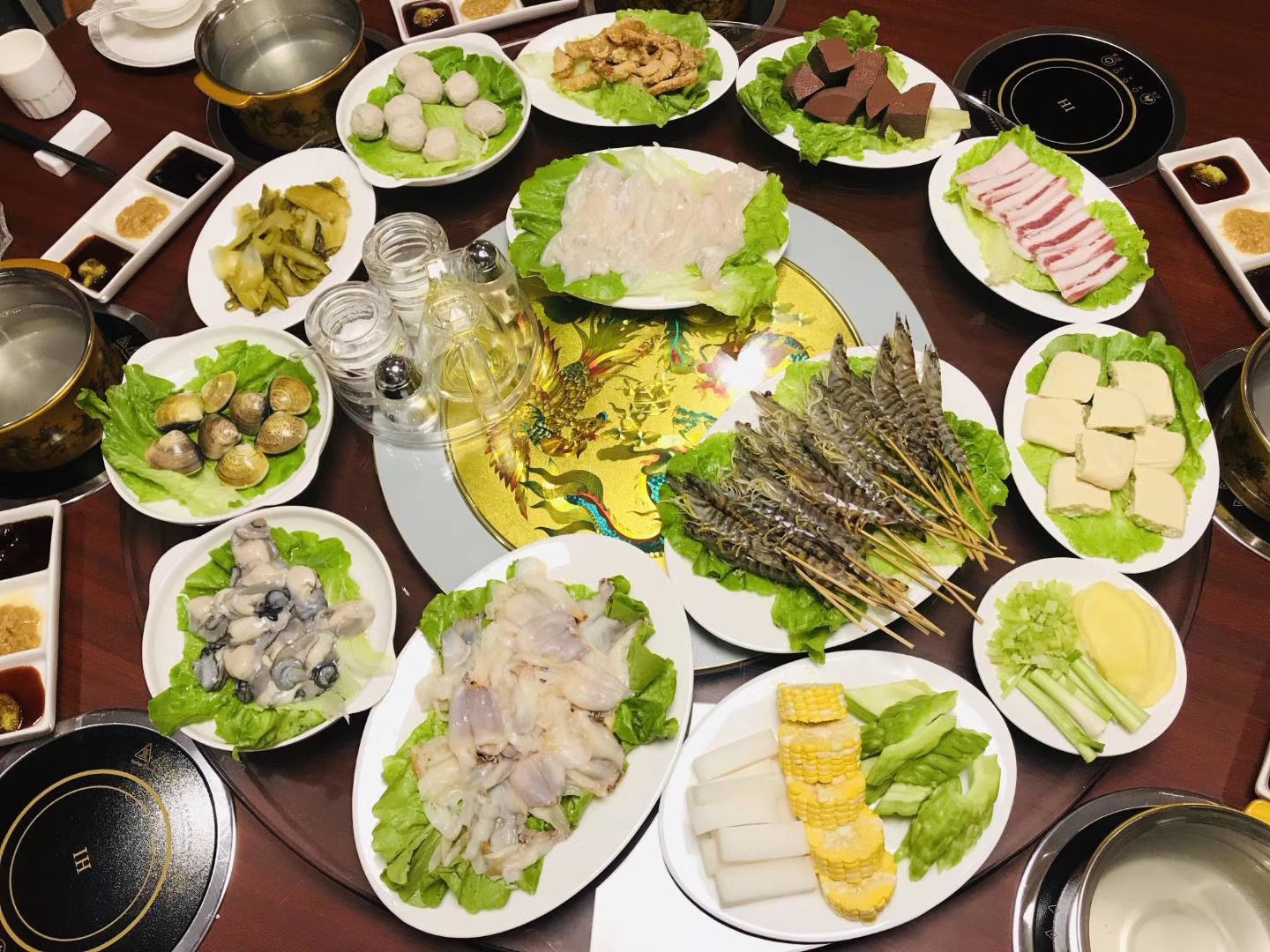
Chaoshan seafood hotpot

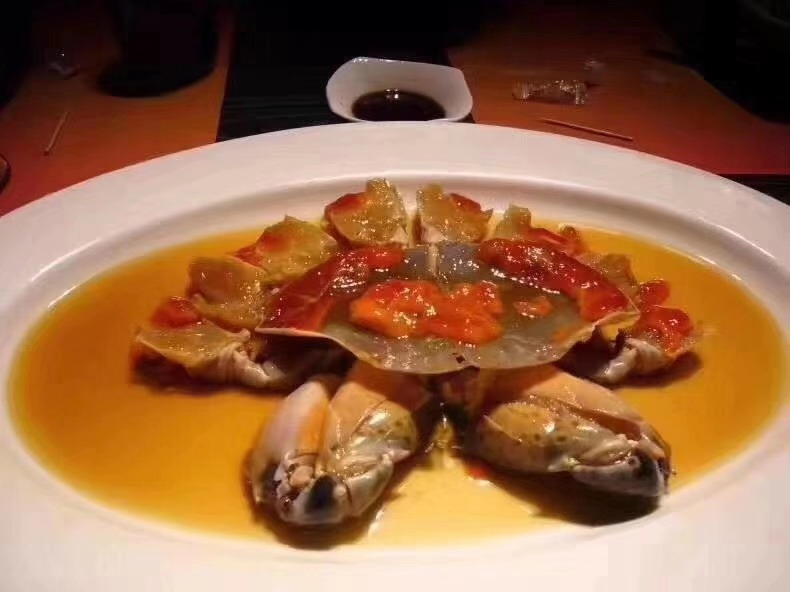
Drunken crabs

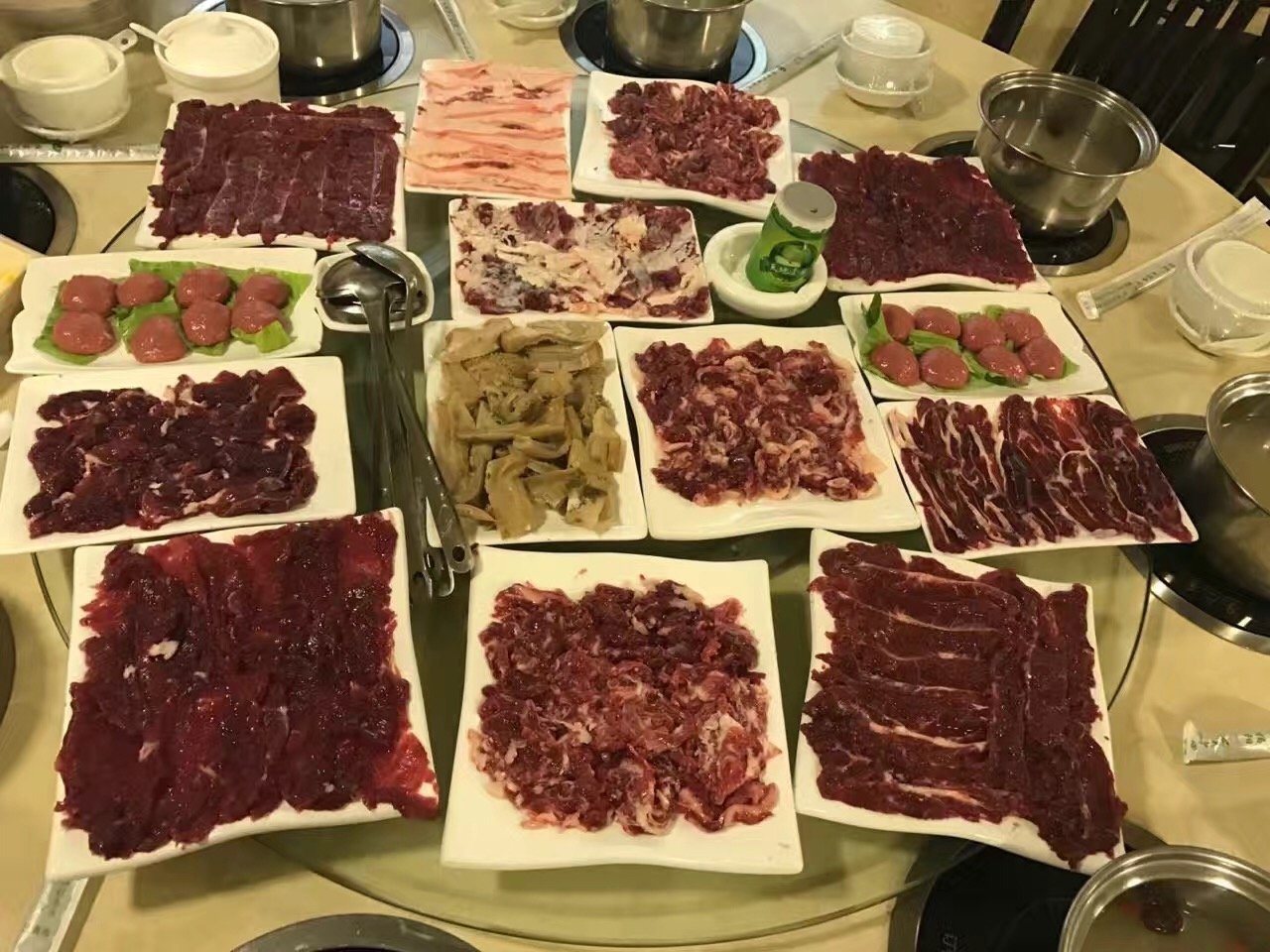
Chaoshan beef hotpot

== See also ==
- Chu Hua Yuan, the area's traditional coming-of-age ceremony
- Lingnan
- Lingnan culture
- Teochew people
- Chaoshan culture
- Thai Chinese
