= Lotus Mountain Range =

Mountain range in Guangdong, China

The Lotus Mountain Range (simplified Chinese: 莲花山脉; traditional Chinese: 蓮花山脈; pinyin: Liánhuā Shānmài; Teochew: noi5 huê1 suan1 mêh8), or Lianhua Mountains, formerly known as "Jieyang Mountain" (揭陽山; Teochew: gig4 iang5 suan1) or "Jieyang Ridge" (揭陽嶺; Teochew: gig4 iang5 niã2), is the second largest mountain range in Guangdong Province of China, following the Nanling Mountains. It originates in northeast Guangdong and runs southwest for approximately 400 kilometers to Daya Bay of the South China Sea, connecting to Shenzhen, Hong Kong, Macao and Guangzhou. The tallest peak of the range is 1,559 meters high. And there are several branch ranges, which forms the watershed between the Han River, Rong River, Dongjiang River, Meijiang River and other coastal rivers flowing directly into the sea.

== Main peak ==
With an elevation of 1,559.5 meters, Tonggu Peak (銅鼓峰) in Fengshun County is the highest and principal summit of the Lotus Mountain Range. The mountain range is called “Lotus Mountain” because Lotus Peak, not Tonggu Peak, was historically the most visually iconic, culturally significant, and symbolically named summit, even though Tonggu Peak is taller.Lotus Peak in Haifeng County remains one of its most iconic mountains. Rising to 1,337 meters, Lotus Peak is the highest point along Guangdong’s eastern coastline. Its silhouette resembles a lotus in full bloom, which gives the mountain its name. Located in the subtropical zone, Lianhua Mountain enjoys an average annual temperature of 21.9°C (71.4°F), relatively low sunshine, and a mild, pleasant climate. Dense forests blanket the area, home to rare species such as Podocarpus macrophyllus, Aquilaria sinensis, Podocarpus longifolia, and Morinda officinalis. The landscape is enriched by eighteen waterfalls—including Yulong Penxu, Sanjing Huiyin, and Longtan Feipu—as well as natural hot springs such as Zhaogong Hot Spring and Puzai Hot Spring. Scattered across the mountain are seven historic temples built during the Ming and Qing dynasties, among them Jiming Temple, Yunlian Temple, and Jinzhu Temple. In March 1995, Guangdong Lianhua Mountain Forest Park was formally established, and it officially opened to the public on June 23, 1997.

== Branches ==
=== Yinna Mountain ===
The Lotus Mountain Range starts at Yinna Mountain and runs southwest to end at Daya Bay of the South China Sea. Yinna Mountain is located at the junction of Meixian District and Dapu County in Meizhou City, Guangdong Province. Its main peak, Yuhuangding, is 1,298 meters above sea level. On a clear day, one can see Chaozhou, Tingzhou and Meizhou from the top of the mountain, hence the saying "Looking at the three prefectures from the depths of the white clouds".

=== Tonggu Peak ===
Tongguzhang (Chinese: 铜鼓嶂), 1559 m, is the highest peak of the entire Lotus Mountain Range as well as in eastern Guangdong. It is located in Shatian Town, Fengshun County.

=== Phoenix Mountain ===
Phoenix Mountain is located at the junction of Chaoan County and Fengshun County. Its main peak, Phoenix Ridge (also known as the Bird Ridge), is 1,497.8 meters above sea level, making it the highest peak in Chaozhou City. Phoenix Mountain is the ancestral home and settlement of the She people in the Chaoshan region. It is also the main production area of the famous Chinese tea "Phoenix Dancong".

=== Sangpu Mountain ===
Sangpu Mountain is located at the junction of the three cities of Shantou, Chaozhou, and Jieyang. It is 484 meters above sea level and stretches for 27 kilometers. The Tropic of Cancer passes through it. The Rongjiang River in the southwest of Chaoshan and the Hanjiang River in the northeast flow through Sangpu Mountain. The terrain is strategically important. Fengmen Ancient Path (one of the four ancient paths) was once the only way from Chaozhou to Chaoyang. Now, National Highway 206 passes by the foot of the mountain, and Jieyang Chaoshan Airport, the largest civilian airport in eastern Guangdong, is located on the north side.

=== Little North Mountain ===
The Little North Mountain is located at the border of Shantou City and Puning City, and extends 34 kilometers from northwest to southeast. The highest peak is Dajian Mountain at 447.2 meters above sea level.

=== Large North Mountain ===
The Large North Mountain is located in Jiexi County. It has an average altitude of over 700 meters and a highest peak of 1100 meters. Thin clouds linger around the mountains, which are verdant and rich in water. The area boasts dense primeval forests and over 70 rare tree species, including the Fujian cypress, a national first-class protected plant.

=== Large South Mountain ===
The Large South Mountain, or Danan Mountain, is located at the junction of Chaonan District, Puning City and Huilai County. The longest east-west direction is about 50 kilometers, and the widest north-south direction is about 30 kilometers, with an area of about 1,000 square kilometers. The highest peak in Chaonan District is Leiling Peak at 521 meters above sea level, while the highest peak in Puning is Wangtianshi Peak at 972 meters above sea level. And there are the provincial-level Guangdong Large South Mountain Forest Park and several cultural and tourist attractions.

=== Wudun Mountain ===
Wudun Mountain, also known as Wutu, is the highest mountain in Zijin County and one of the sources of the Qinjiang River, the upper reach of the Han River. Its main peak is 1232.9 meters above sea level and is located at the southern end of Nanling Town, bordering Luhe County.

=== Wuqinzhang Mountain ===
Wuqinzhang Mountain is located in the northeastern part of Huidong County, bordering Zijin County. It is a large mountain range that runs across the northern part of Huidong County. The main peak, Wuqinzhang (Black Birds Mountain), is 1186.2 meters above sea level and is named for its rocks that resemble a standing bird of prey. The mountain is home to the largest population of Chinese pangolins and is a sanctuary for them.

=== Wutong Mountain ===
The Lotus Mountain Range ends in Daya Bay, connecting to Wutong Mountain in Shenzhen and Robin's Nest in Hong Kong. At 943.7m high, Wutong Mountain is the tallest mountain in Shenzhen. It is also the source of the Shenzhen River.

Wutong Mountain is a state-level urban scenic area with landscape features the integration of mountains, sea and lake, and the overview of Shenzhen and Hong Kong. The main attraction of Wutong Mountain is the two main peaks of Big Wutong and Little Wutong. The Big Wutong is the highest peak in Shenzhen.

== Lotus Hills ==
There are "Lotus Hills" in Guangzhou, Shenzhen, Dongguan, Shanwei, and Huizhou in southern Guangdong, as well as in Hong Kong. They are all "children" belonging to the Lotus Mountain Range, including

- Lotus Hill, in Guangzhou
- Lianhuashan Park, in Shenzhen
- Lin Fa Shan, in Lantau, Hong Kong
- Lin Fa Shan, Tsuen Wan, in Tsuen Wan, Hong Kong
- Robin's Nest, in Hong Kong.

== See also ==
- Nanling Mountains
