= North River (Rong River) =

River in China

Coordinates: 23°30′05″N 116°27′26″E

The North River (Chinese: 北河; pinyin: Běihé), full name Rongjiang North River (榕江北河), also known as Tang River (湯溪; Tāngxī), is located in the southeast of Guangdong Province, the People's Republic of China. The river, 92 kilometers long, is the largest tributary of the Rong River. It is named North River because it flows through the north of the urban area of Jieyang City.

== Characteristics ==
Rongjiang North River originates from Tongziyang of Beidou Town in the Lotus Mountains area of Fengshun County, Meizhou City, and flows northeastward through Youshuxia. Then turns southeast and passes through Beidou Town, Tangxi Town, the county seat Tangkeng Town, Tangnan Town; then flows into Jieyang City, through Yuhu Town, Yuecheng Town and Xichang Town, Jieyang urban area and Jiedong District urban area, and finally flows into the Rong River in Shuangxi Zui of Paotai Town, Rongcheng District.

The river is 92 kilometers long, with an average river channel drop of 1.14‰, a drainage area of 1,629 square kilometers, and an average annual runoff of 817 million cubic meters. The tributaries of the North River include Wenshui River, Xinxi River and Feng River on the left bank and the Longche River on the right bank.

== Water pollution ==
The North River was polluted a few years ago. Now, due to the efforts of the government and the people living nearby, the water quality is much better, but still not completely clear, especially the severe sewage discharge from tributaries. People are looking forward to the day when the water in Rongjiang North River can become clear.
