= Feng River =

River in Guangdong, China

Coordinates: 23°32′52″N 116°26′20″E

The Feng River (simplified Chinese: 枫江; traditional Chinese: 楓江; pinyin: Fēng jiāng) is located in the southeast of Guangdong Province, People's Republic of China. It is a tributary of the Rong River. The upper part of the Feng River is also called Xishan Creek (西山溪). It originates from Beacon Hill (筆架山) at the junction of Chaozhou City, Jieyang City and Meizhou City, and flows from the northwest to southeast through Dengtang Town, turns southwest at Guxiang Town, and passes through Fengxi District and Fengtang Town of Chaozhou City, Yujiao Town, Denggang Town, Yunlu Town and other places of Jieyang City, and finally flows into the Rongjiang North River in Paotai Town in the south of Jieyang City. The river is 71 kilometers long, with a basin area of 664 square kilometers and an average annual runoff of 229 million cubic meters.

Jieyang Chaoshan International Airport, the third largest airport in Guangdong, is located on the left bank of the lower reaches of the Feng River.

== Water pollution ==
The Feng River used to be badly polluted for quite a long time, smelly and there were many water lilies. On January 11, 2021, the Guangdong Provincial Ecological Environmental Protection Supervision Office implemented listing supervision on the local governments. In 2022, the water quality of the Feng River Shenkeng National Examination Section reached the national surface water Class V water quality standard, realizing the transformation from dirty to clean, and from clean to clear.
