= Sangpu Mountain =

Mountain in Guangdong, China

Coordinates: 23°30′13″N 116°32′48″E

Sangpu Mountain (Chinese: 桑浦山; pinyin: Sāngpǔ Shān; lit. 'mulberry waterside mountain') is named after the mulberry trees that were once abundant at the mountain area near the Rong River. It is located at the junction of the 3 prefecture-level cities of Shantou, Chaozhou and Jieyang in eastern Guangdong Province of China. With an altitude of 484 meters and a stretch of 27 kilometers, the mountain is a Guangdong provincial nature reserves area, and is known as "the First Mountain in Chaoshan". The Tropic of Cancer passes through here, and Shantou University is located in it. Jieyang Chaoshan International Airport and Chaoshan railway station, the largest airport and the largest high-speed rail station in eastern Guangdong, both lie nearby.

== Shantou University ==
Shantou University, or STU, is located in the Sangpu Mountain area of Shantou City. It is jointly established by the Chinese Ministry of Education, the People's Government of Guangdong Province and the Li Ka Shing Foundation. The campus covers a total area of 1,889.28 mu and a total built area of 566,000 square meters. In September 2013, Shantou University and Technion-Israel Institute of Technology signed the memorandum of understanding for the establishment of the Guangdong Technion – Israel Institute of Technology (GTIIT).

== Tropic of Cancer Marker Tower ==
The Tropic of Cancer Marker Tower is located about 5 kilometers north of Shantou University and was completed and opened to the public in 1986. It is about 13.6 meters tall in the form of a 5-meter-diameter globe supported by a "北" (north) shaped rack. Every year at 12 noon on the summer solstice, when the sun shines directly on the globe, there will be an astronomical view of "Standing up a pole with no shadow to be seen" (立竿不见影).

== Famous Tombs ==
The Tomb of Lin Daqin, located in Sangpu Mountain, Jinshi Town, Chaozhou City, was built in the Jiajing period of the Ming Dynasty, and is the tomb of Lin Daqin, the only champion of liberal arts (文科狀元) in the history of the imperial examination of Chaoshan Region. In 1987, Lin Daqin's tomb was listed as a key cultural relics protection unit in Chaozhou City, and on October 20, 2012, it was promoted to a cultural relics protection unit in Guangdong Province.

The Tomb of Sun Mozhai, located in Sangpu Mountain, Shaxi Town, Chaozhou City, is a provincial cultural relics protection unit announced in October 2012. Sun Mozhai, a native of Shangxilin Village, Shaxi Town, is also called Weng Wanda, a secretary of military department (兵部尚書) in the Ming Dynasty of China.

The Tomb of Weng Meizhai, which is the tomb of Weng Wanda's father Weng Yu, covers an area of about 20,000 square meters. It is the largest tomb in eastern Guangdong and the only ancient tomb for imperial burial in Chaoshan.

== Dongshan Lake Hot Spring Resort ==
Dongshan Lake Hot Spring Resort, located in Sangpu Dongshan Lake District, is a national AAAA-level tourist resort covering an area of more than 1,000 acres. The resort has a five-story cave-like hot spring hill, with 99 hot spring pools of different temperatures and different forms.

== Nanlong Reservoir ==
Nanlong Reservoir is a scenic reserve located in the Sangpu Mountain area of Didu Town, Jieyang City. It is the largest reservoir on Sangpu Mountain, and the reflection of the mountains on the waters is like a wonderful landscape painting.

== Windgate Trail ==
Located 5 kilometers southeast of Paotai Town in Jieyang City, Windgate Trail is an ancient road between Peak 1, the highest peak of Sangpu Mountain, and the Peak 2. It was once the only way from the ancient Chaozhou Capital to Jieyang County.

== Dragon Spring Rock ==
Dragon String Rock, or Longquan Rock, is located in Dragon Spring Mount in southeast Sangpu Mountain. It is divided into a covering upper rock and a lower rock. There is a hall in the cave with an area of 64.4 square meters and capable to accommodate dozens of people. Because there is a little spring behind the rock that does not dry up all year round, it is called "Dragon Spring Rock". There are strange rocks standing in front and back. There are 4 Buddhist temples and the Weng Gong Academy in commemoration of Weng Wanda, the Minister of Military of the Ming Dynasty. Dragon Spring Rock is a cultural relic protection unit at the Shantou Municipal level.

== See also ==
- Chaoshan
- Jieyang
- Shantou
- Chaozhou
