= Chaoyang Town =

Chaoyang Town (朝阳镇) could refer to a number of towns in China:

- Chaoyang, Wuxi County, Chongqing
- Chaoyang, Zhangzhou, in Longwen District, Zhangzhou, Fujian
- Chaoyang, Libo County, Guizhou
- Chaoyang, Harbin, in Xiangfang District, Harbin, Heilongjiang
- Chaoyang, Jiayin County, Heilongjiang
- Chaoyang, Huade County, Ulanqab, Inner Mongolia
- Chaoyang, Urat Front Banner, Inner Mongolia
- Chaoyang, Lianyungang, in Lianyun District, Lianyungang, Jiangsu
- Chaoyang, Shulan, Jilin
- Chaoyang, Huinan County, Jilin
- Chaoyang, Changtu County, Liaoning
- Chaoyang, Shouyang County, Shanxi
- Chaoyang, Neijiang, in Shizhong District, Neijiang, Sichuan
