= Shuangfeng Temple =

Buddhist temple in Jieyang, China

- 双峰寺
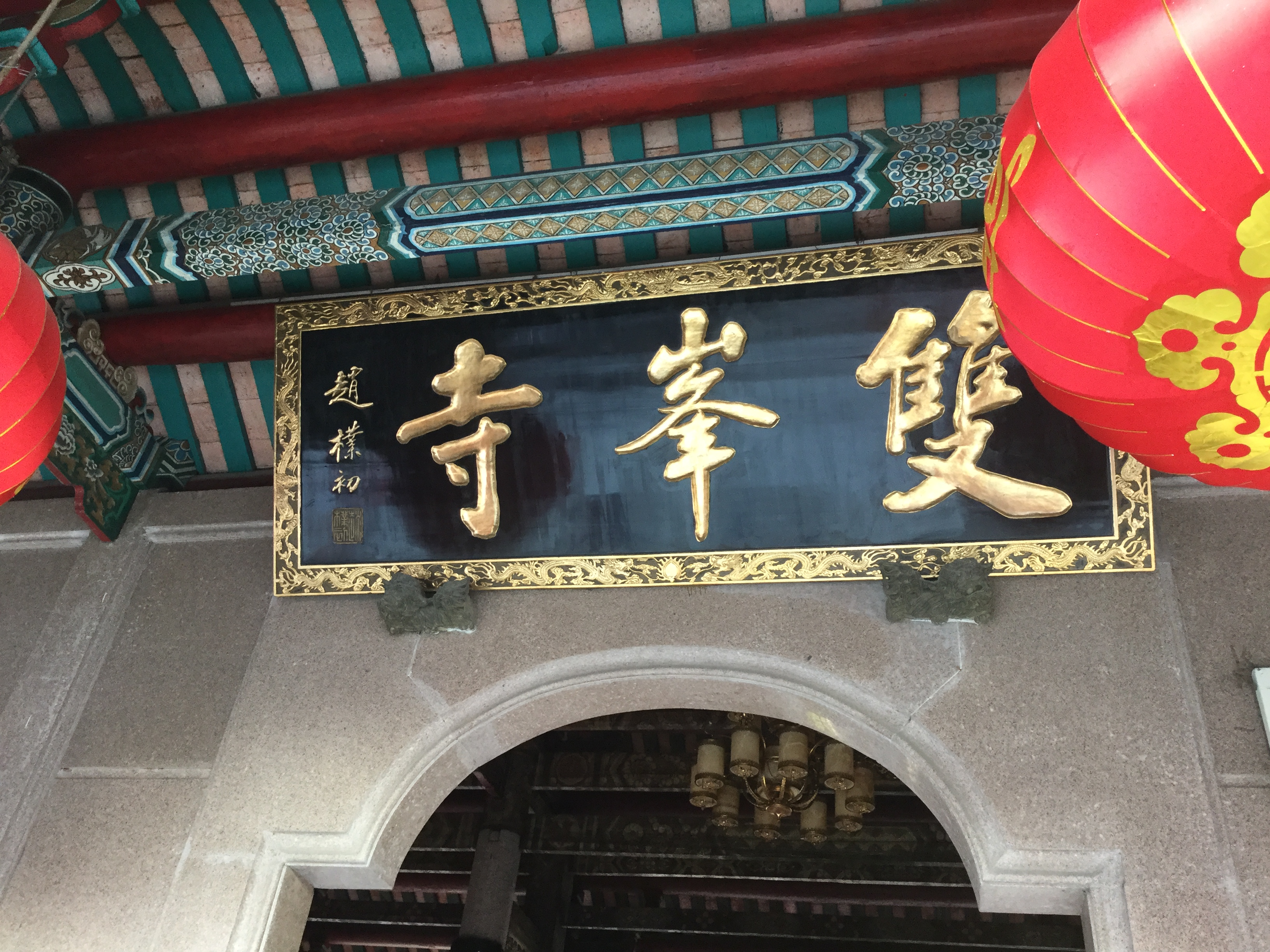
- Under the eaves is a plaque with the Chinese characters "Shuangfeng Temple" written by the former Venerable Master of the Buddhist Association of China Zhao Puchu.

- Location within Guangdong

Religion
- Affiliation: Buddhism
- Deity: Chan Buddhism
- Leadership: Shi Yaoyu

Location
- Location: Rongcheng District, Jieyang, Guangdong
- Country: China
- Interactive map of Shuangfeng Temple
- Coordinates: 23°22′02.25″N 116°21′01.4″E

Architecture
- Style: Chinese architecture
- Established: 1140
- Completed: 1991 (reconstruction)

Shuangfeng Temple (simplified Chinese: 双峰寺; traditional Chinese: 雙峰寺; pinyin: Shuāngfēng Sì) is a Buddhist temple located in Rongcheng District of Jieyang, Guangdong, China. Alongside the Kaiyuan Temple and Lingshan Temple, it is one of the Three Great Buddhist Temples of Chaojun (潮郡). It had been on the list of The Eight Views of Jieyang - The evening gong at Shuangfeng Temple.

== History ==
Shuangfeng Temple was built in 1140 by master Fashan (法山禅师), under the Southern Song dynasty (1127–1279). The temple was dilapidated with huge losses of the cultural relics in 1276. It was rebuilt in 1308 and destroyed in wars during the late Yuan dynasty (1271–1368). In 1391, at the dawn of the Ming dynasty (1368–1644), master Shishan (石山禅师) relocated the temple to today's Rongcheng District. In 1728, in the reign of Yongzheng Emperor of the Qing dynasty (1644–1911), Part of the temple was destroyed by a typhoon, and then magistrate Chen Shuzhi restored it. In 1925, magistrate Chen Zhuofan used it as a school. During the ten-year Cultural Revolution the Red Guards had attacked the temple in 1966. Almost all of the volumes of scriptures, historical documents, and other works of art were either removed, damaged or destroyed in the massive socialist movement. After the 3rd plenary session of the 11th Central Committee of the Chinese Communist Party, according to a policy of some religious freedom, Shuangfeng Temple was officially reopened to the public in 1992. Reconstruction of Shuangfeng Temple, commenced on December 25, 1986 and was completed in 1991. Shi Yaoyu (释耀瑜) was appointed as abbot of the temple by the State Administration for Religious Affairs.

== Architecture ==
Along the central axis of the temple stand seven buildings including the Shanmen, Hall of Dabei (大悲殿), Four Heavenly Kings Hall, Mahavira Hall, and the Buddhist Texts Library. Subsidiary structures were built on both sides of the central axis including the Drum Tower, Bell Tower, and Manjusri Hall.

== Gallery ==
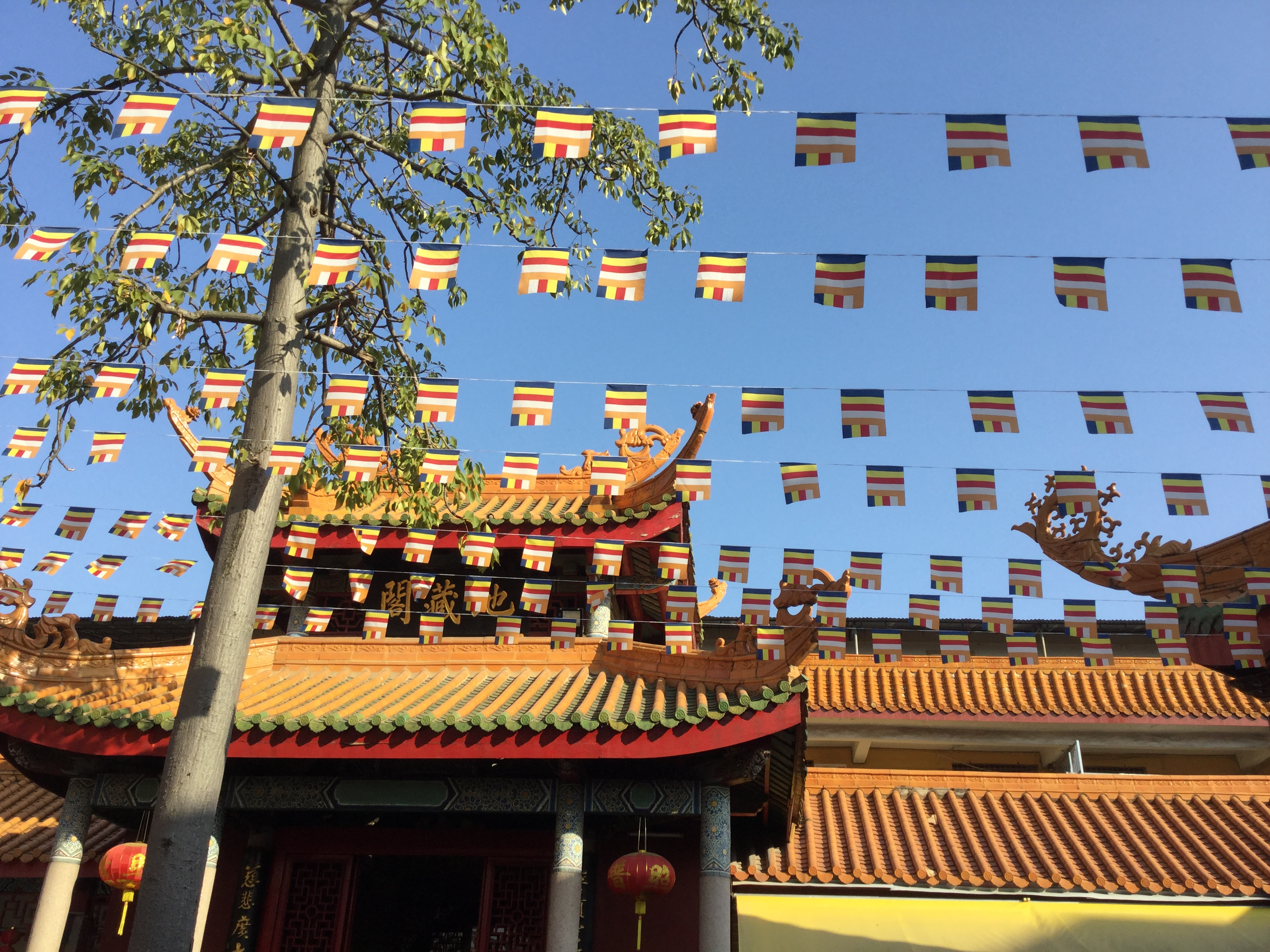
Hall of Ksitigarbha.

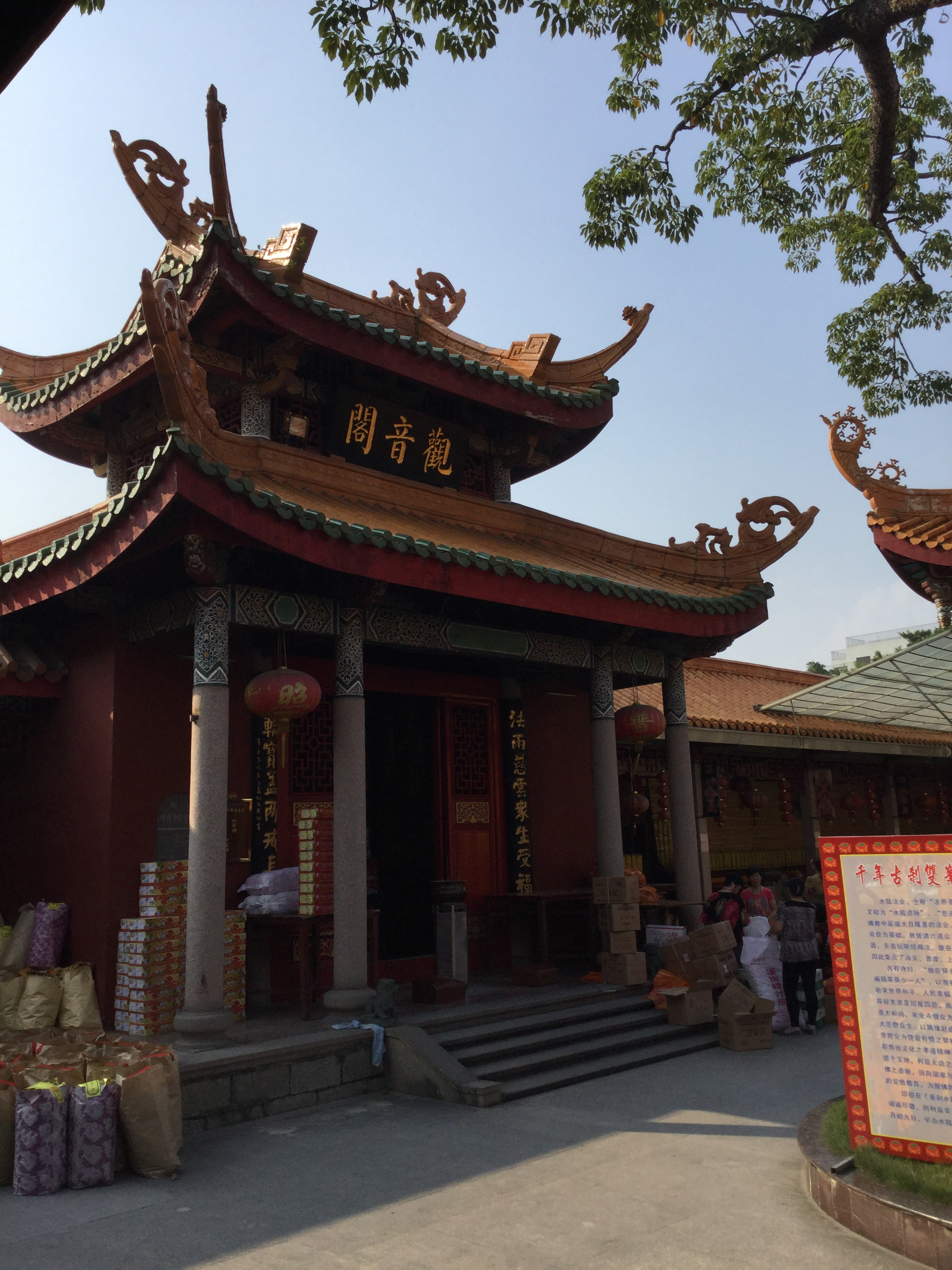
Hall of Avalokitesvara.

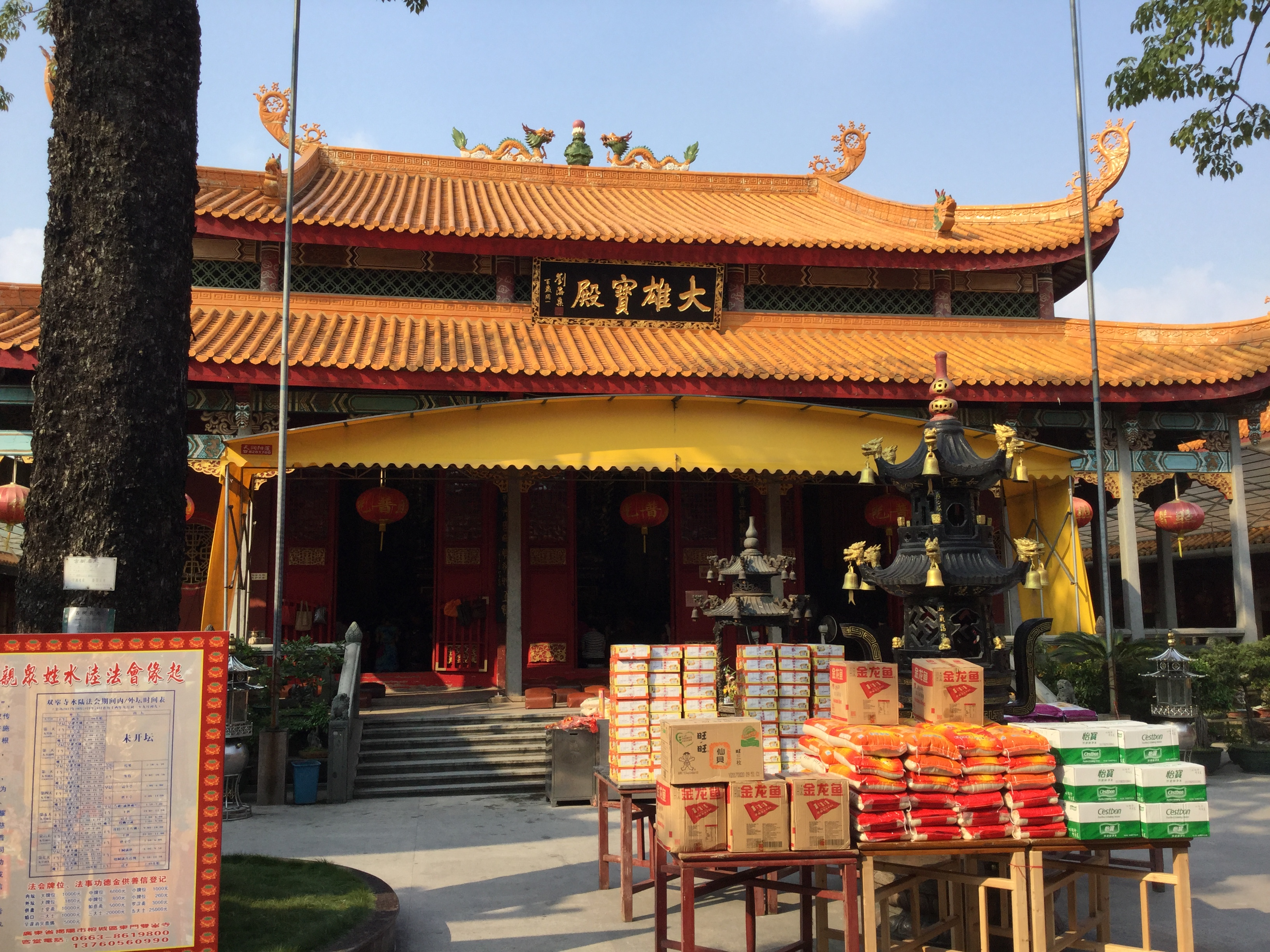
Mahavira Hall.

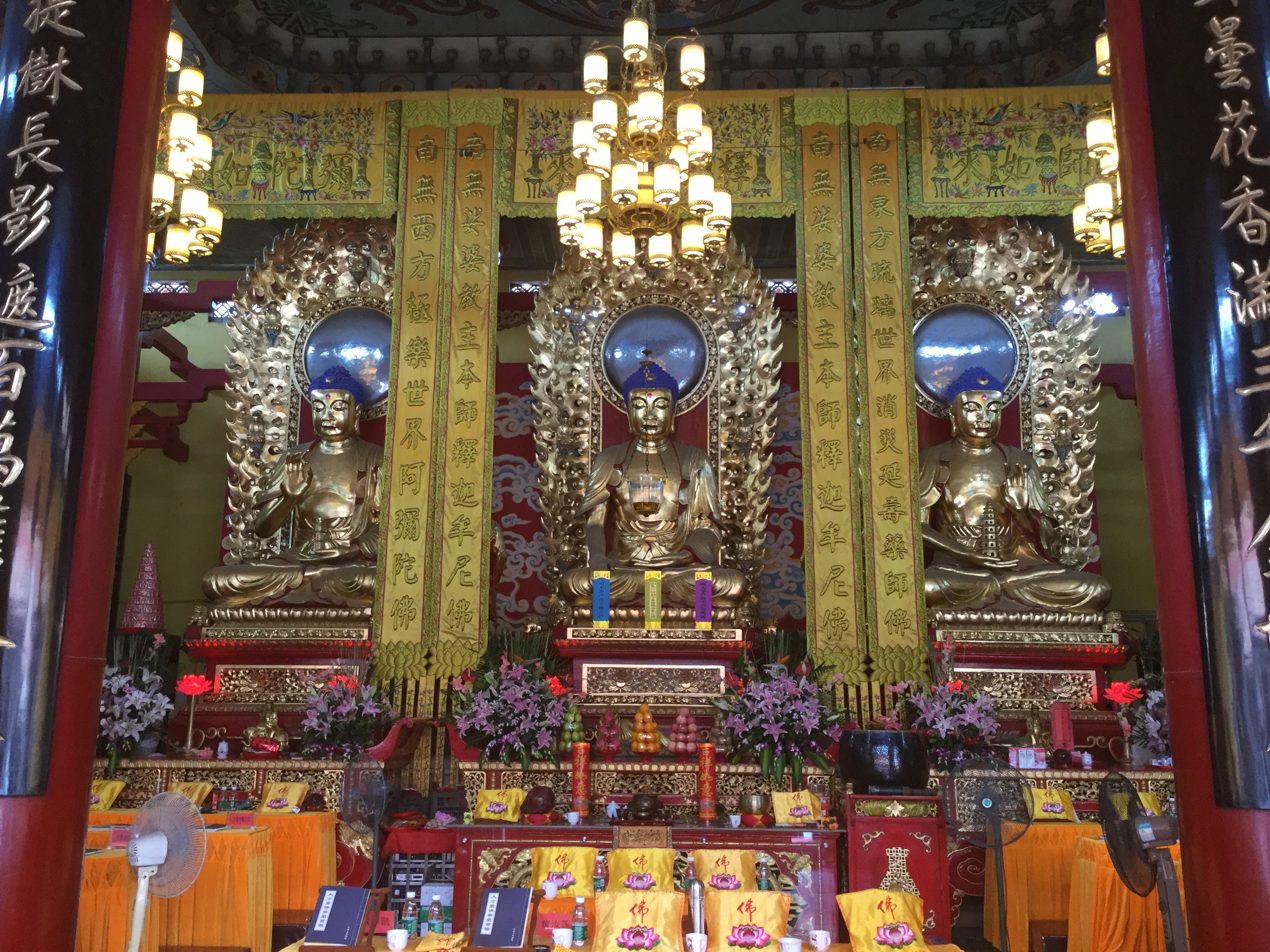
The statues of Three Life Buddha (横三世佛).

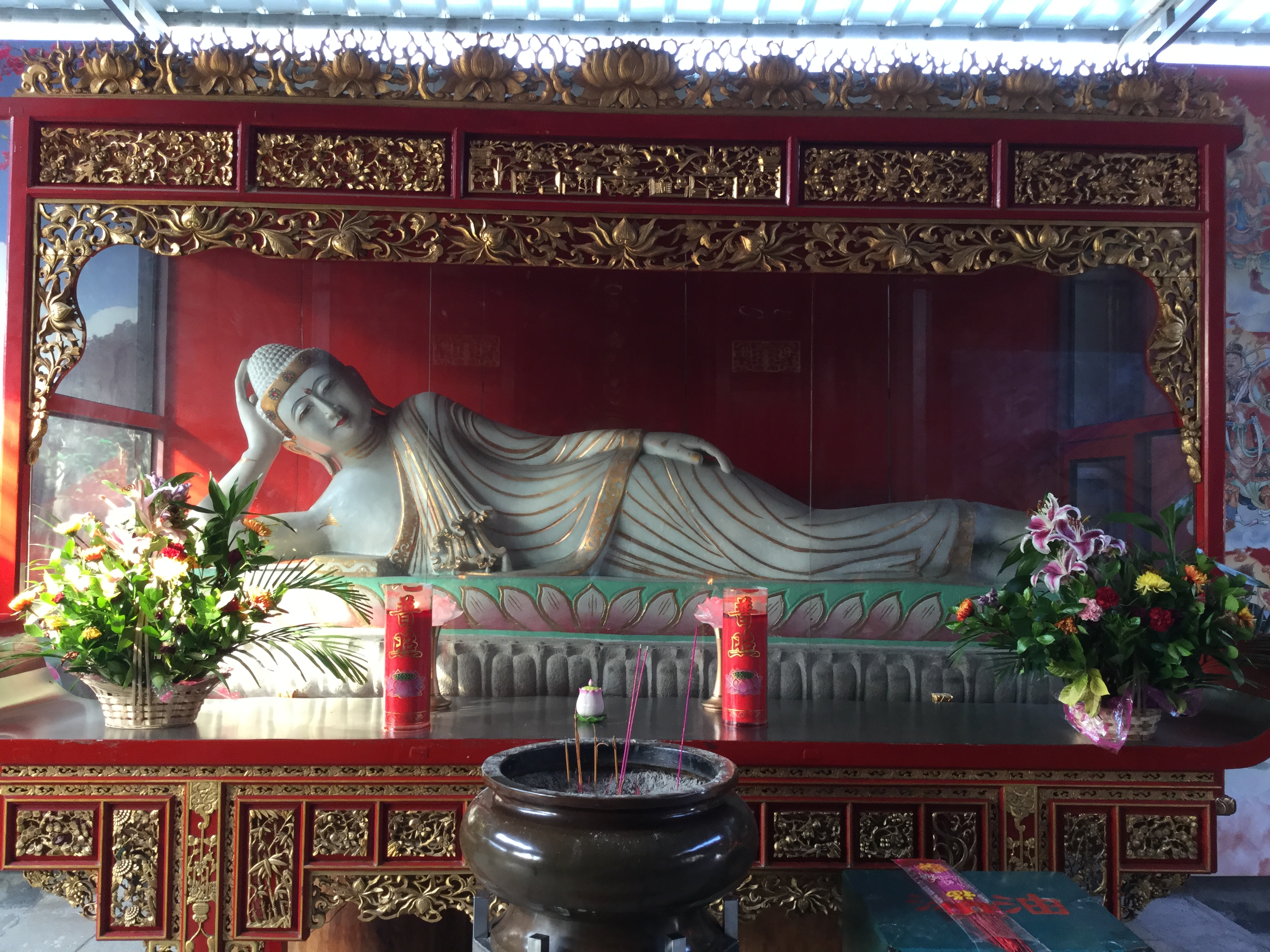
The statue of Reclined Buddha.

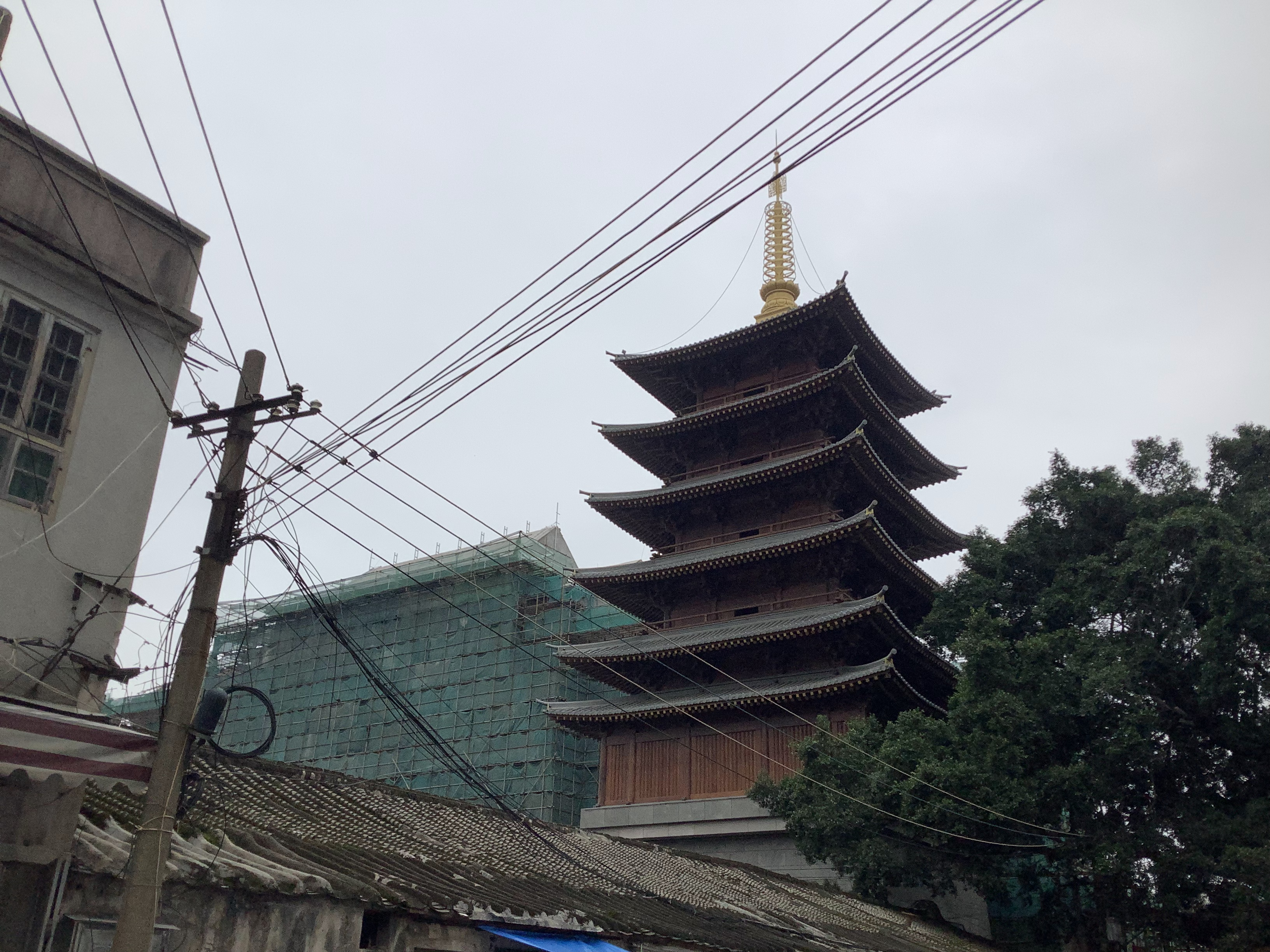
Later the newly built pagoda.
