= Paotai Town (Jieyang) =

Town in Jieyang, China

Coordinates: 23°30′46″N 116°29′14″E

Paotai Town (simplified Chinese: 炮台镇; traditional Chinese: 砲台鎮; pinyin: Pàotái Zhèn) is located in south east China. It is a township-level administrative unit under the jurisdiction of Rongcheng District, Jieyang City, Guangdong Province.

Paotai Town has a population of 116,070 (according to the census in 2020) and a total area of 51.43 km², with the population density of 2,257/km².

== Administrative division ==
Paotai Town has jurisdiction over the following sub-units:

- Paotai Community (simplified Chinese: 炮台社区; traditional Chinese: 炮台社區),
- Xinshi Village (新市村),
- Nanchao Village (南潮村),
- Puzai Village (埔仔村),
- Fengxi Village (丰溪村; 豐溪村),
- Fugang Village (浮岗村; 浮崗村),
- Tangbian Village (塘边村; 塘邊村),
- Taoshan Village (桃山村),
- Longtou Village (龙头村; 龍頭村),
- Xialong Village (下陇村; 下隴村),
- Shipai Village (石牌村),
- Qingxi Village (青溪村).

In China, there is another town also called Paotai Town, which is located in Xinjiang.

== Transportation ==
The Jieyang Chaoshan International Airport, the largest airport in Eastern Guangdong Province, is located next to Paotai. Paotai is also located by the side of Rong River, the mother river of Jieyang and the second longest river in Eastern Guangdong.

== See also ==
- Rongcheng, Jieyang
- Jieyang
- Denggang Town
- List of township-level divisions of Guangdong
