= Phoenix Mountain (Chaozhou) =

Mountain in Guangdong, China

Highest point
- Elevation: 1,497.8 m (4,914 ft)
- Coordinates: 23°54′43″N 116°35′55″E

Geography
- Location: On the border between Chao’an District of Chaozhou City and Fengshun County of Meizhou City, Guangdong Province
- Parent range: Phoenix Mountain Range

The Phoenix Mountains (simplified Chinese: 凤凰山; traditional Chinese: 鳳凰山; pinyin: Fènghuáng shān; Teochew: Hong⁶‑Hong⁵‑Suaⁿ¹) are a prominent geographical and cultural landmark located in Chaozhou City, Guangdong, China — primarily within Chao'an District. The range’s highest peak, Niaoji Mountain (鳥髻山; Teochew: Zio²‑Gi³‑Suaⁿ¹; lit. Bird Topknot or Bird Hair-bun), reaches approximately 1,497.8 meters and is celebrated as the "Roof of Chaoshan" (潮汕屋脊) and the highest peak in eastern Guangdong. The area is one of China’s most important centers for high‑quality oolong tea production, especially the renowned Fenghuang Dancong.

== Main peaks ==
The main peak of the Phoenix (Fenghuang) Mountain Range is Niaoji Mountain, also called Fengniao Ji (鳳鳥髻; Teochew: Hong⁶‑Zio²‑Gi³; lit. Phoenix Bird Topknot or Phoenix Bird Hair-bun)—which rises to an elevation of 1,497.5 meters, making it the highest peak in the Chaoshan region of eastern Guangdong.

Although Niaoji Mountain is the tallest point in the range, the Phoenix Mountains are often defined in the public imagination by their most accessible and culturally significant summits. Wudong Peak (烏崬山; Teochew: u¹‑dong¹‑suaⁿ¹), the second-highest peak at approximately 1,391–1,397 meters, is especially well known for Tianchi (天池; Teochew: Thian¹-Di⁵; lit. Heavenly Lake), a roughly 40,000‑square‑meter natural crater lake formed by ancient volcanic activity.

The summit area of the range is characterized by rich biodiversity and dense forest cover, earning it the reputation of an “ecological barrier of eastern Guangdong.” The slopes leading toward the main peaks host more than 3,000 ancient tea trees, many between 200 and 400 years old, forming the core terroir of the famed Fenghuang Dancong oolong. Notable cultural and natural landmarks include Taizi Cave (太子洞; Teochew: Thai³‑Zi²‑Tang⁷; lit. Crown Prince Cave) on the northern slope of Niaoji Mountain, about one kilometer from Tianchi, a site woven into local legend. From the upper ridges, visitors can enjoy 360‑degree panoramic views of the surrounding mountain chains as well as the Fenghuang reservoir (鳳凰水庫) and Fengxi reservoir (鳳溪水庫) .

== Major attractions ==
=== Phoenix Heavenly Lake (鳳凰天池) ===
Phoenix Heavenly Lake lies on Wudong Peak of Phoenix Mountain in Chao’an District, at an elevation of 1,325 meters, with the surrounding summit reaching 1,391 meters. Nearby stands the region’s highest peak, Fengniao Ji (1,497.8 m). The lake was formed from an ancient volcanic crater and is praised as the "First Heavenly Lake of the South" (南國第一天池). Its waters never dry up, and the area is often shrouded in drifting clouds and mist, creating breathtaking scenery. Known for its clarity, serenity, strangeness, and dreamlike atmosphere, the lake covers about 60 to 76 mu (60 - 70 畝; roughly 4 to 5 hectares) and is one of Chaozhou’s most iconic natural sights.

=== Phoenix Dancong tea ===
Phoenix Mountain is the exclusive origin of the renowned Phoenix Dancong oolong tea. The mountain is home to many ancient tea trees—some over a century old, and some believed to date back more than 600 years to the Song dynasty. Tea cultivation here has a history of over 900 years, especially on the mist‑covered high slopes of Wudong Mountain. Phoenix Dancong is a premium semi‑fermented oolong tea named for its tradition of “single‑bush picking and single‑bush processing.” It is celebrated for its beautiful shape, emerald color, rich fragrance, and sweet, lingering taste. Its aroma is elegant and diverse, with famous varieties such as Honey‑Orchid Fragrance and Duck‑Shit Fragrance. The tea is rich in polyphenols and known for its distinctive “mountain charm”. The main peak, Phoenix Crest, together with surrounding peaks such as Jigong Ji and Wudong Mountain, forms the ideal ecological environment that gives Phoenix Dancong its unique character. For the oldest Song‑dynasty tea trees, they are harvested only once each spring, producing about 13 jin (斤; equal to 0.5 kg) of maocha (毛茶; raw tea). The price is around 40,000 yuan (approx. US$5,750) per jin.

=== Cultural heritage of the She People ===
Phoenix Mountain is widely regarded as the birthplace of the She ethnic group. Areas such as Shiguping preserve strong traces of She cultural traditions. According to legend, the She people are descendants of Panhu, who multiplied here before migrating to Fujian, Zhejiang, and other regions.

According to legend, the She people are descendants of Panhu (盤瓠), the legendary dog, said to have been born from a concubine’s ear and cherished in the imperial palace for his intelligence. When the emperor promised the princess’s hand to whoever could kill the invading enemy chieftain, Panhu succeeded by biting off the leader’s head. The princess honored the promise, and although Panhu attempted to transform into a human by staying inside a great bell for seven days, her premature curiosity left him with a human body but a dog’s head. The couple later settled in the southern mountains (Phoenix Mountain) and had children whose surnames — Pan (盤), Lan (藍), Lei (雷) and Zhong (鍾), became foundational among the She. Variants of the Panhu legend appear among the She (畬族), Yao (瑤族), Xiangxi Miao (湘西苗族), and some northern Vietnamese groups. Scholars note that She women’s head ornaments symbolize Panhu’s dog head, while certain clothing traits described in ancient texts survive more clearly among the Yao than the She today. The She call themselves "Shan ha" (山哈), meaning “guests of the mountains,” reflecting their long history of mountain dwelling and cultivation. They regard the phoenix as an auspicious symbol, and traditional women’s attire—known as “phoenix dress”—features bright embroidery and distinctive headpieces symbolizing dignity and grace.

=== Phoenix Ecotourism Zone ===
The Phoenix Ecotourism Zone (鳳凰生態旅遊區) lies in the heart of the Phoenix Mountain Range, directly beneath Niaoji Peak—the highest summit in eastern Guangdong. Covering an area of 30 square kilometers at elevations ranging from 250 to 1,497 meters, the region maintains a forest coverage rate of nearly 90 percent. Its dense canopy, pristine air, and clean water all meet China’s highest national environmental standards. The area is home to 225 species of terrestrial vertebrates, including 34 rare and endangered species, representing 29.1 percent of all endangered wildlife recorded in Guangdong. It also contains 1,281 species of wild vascular plants, among which 12 are classified as rare or endangered, accounting for 15.2 percent of the province’s total. With its exceptional biodiversity, the Phoenix Ecotourism Zone is widely regarded as the Chaoshan region’s foremost "reservoir of species" (物種寶庫), serving as both an ecological stronghold and a living botanical showcase—earning it the titles "Ecological Barrier of Eastern Guangdong" (粵東生態屏障) and "The Great Botanical Garden of Chaoshan" (潮汕植物大觀園).

=== Taiping Temple ===
Taiping Temple (太平寺), commonly called "Da’an" (大庵; Teochew: Dua⁷ Am¹), is located in Da’an Village of Fengxi Village, Fenghuang Town. It stands on the eastern summit of Wudong Mountain at about 1,325 meters above sea level. The temple was founded in the thirteenth year of the Shunzhi reign (順治十三年; 1656 AD) by the Qing‑dynasty general Wu Liuqi (吳六奇), and completed in 1660. In front of the temple lie seven small peaks poetically known as "Seven Stars Chasing the Moon" (七星趕月; Teochew: chit⁴‑seng¹‑goaⁿ²‑gueh⁸), creating a majestic landscape.

=== Zhengqi Hall — Legacy of Wen Tianxiang ===
On Phoenix Mountain stands Zhengqi Hall (正氣堂), an important cultural site commemorating the Southern Song national hero Wen Tianxiang and his descendants. More than a clan shrine, it symbolizes the local Wen lineage’s commitment to the spirit of righteousness. Zhengqi Hall is located in Houbu Village of Fenghuang Town. Xiabu and five neighboring villages are largely inhabited by Wen Tianxiang’s descendants. At the end of the Southern Song, his family fled into the deep mountains of Phoenix Mountain to escape the Yuan army. The hall is named after Wen Tianxiang’s famous "Song of Righteousness" (正氣歌), and houses his statue along with commemorative plaques. Local villagers regard the Song of Righteousness as their "village anthem," upholding the ancestral teaching: "Sing the Song of Righteousness, be a person of righteousness" (唱正氣歌、做正氣人). The village’s Wenshan School (文山學校) also features a statue of Wen Tianxiang and incorporates his heroic deeds into local education.
