= Chaoyang, Cili =

Chaoyang Township
- Township

Chinese transcription(s)
  - Simplified: 朝阳乡
  - Traditional: 朝陽鄉
  - Pinyin: Chaoyang Xiang
- Location in China
- Coordinates: 29°19′58″N 111°02′01″E
- Country: People's Republic of China
- Province: Hunan
- City: Zhangjiajie
- County: Cili County

Area
  - Total: 53 km^{2} (20 sq mi)

Population
  - Total: 8,948
  - Density: 170/km^{2} (440/sq mi)
- Time zone: UTC+8 (China Standard)
- Area code: 0744

Chaoyang Township (simplified Chinese: 朝阳乡; traditional Chinese: 朝陽鄉; pinyin: Chaoyang Xiang) is a rural township in Cili County, Zhangjiajie, Hunan Province, People's Republic of China.

== Administrative divisions ==
The township is divided into 12 villages, which include the following areas: Yanping Village, Sanrong Village, Hongyuan Village, Chaoyang Village, Siping Village, Shuangya Village, Luogu Village, Miaogang Village, Wanfu Village, Shabaijie Village, Heyan Village, and Jinlong Village (岩坪村、三溶村、洪源村、朝阳村、四坪村、双垭村、锣鼓村、庙岗村、万福村、沙泊街村、合堰村、金龙村).
