= Chaoyang District =

Chaoyang District may refer to the following locations in the People's Republic of China:

- Chaoyang, Beijing (北京市 朝阳区)
- Chaoyang, Changchun (吉林省 长春市 朝阳区), Jilin
- Chaoyang, Shantou (广东省 汕头市 潮阳区), Guangdong
