= Shaxi (Chaozhou) =

Town in Chao'an, Chaozhou, China

Coordinates: 23°32′6″N 116°34′56″E

Shaxi Town (simplified Chinese: 沙溪镇; traditional Chinese: 沙溪鎮; pinyin: Shāxī Zhèn) is a township-level administrative unit under the jurisdiction of Chao'an District, Chaozhou City, Guangdong Province, the People's Republic of China. It has a population of 57,677 (according to the census in 2010) and a total area of 33.41 km², with the population density of 1,726/km².

The Chaoshan Station of the Xiamen-Shenzhen Railway, serving Shantou, Chaozhou and Jieyang, is located in Shaxi Town.

== Administrative division ==
Shaxi Town has jurisdiction over the following subdivisions:

- Shaxi Community (simplified Chinese: 沙溪社区; traditional Chinese: 沙溪社區),
- Qianlong 1st Village (前陇一村; 前隴一村),
- Qianlong 2nd Village (前陇二村; 前隴二村),
- Shangxilin Village (上西林村),
- Xiaxilin Village (下西林村; 下西林村),
- Neichi Village (内池村; 內池村),
- Shengju Village (生聚村; 生聚村),
- Shaxi 1st Village (沙溪一村),
- Shaxi 2nd Village (沙溪二村),
- Gaosha 1st Village (高厦一村; 高廈一村),
- Gaosha 2nd Village (高厦二村; 高廈二村),
- Gaolou Village (高楼村; 高樓村),
- Wujialong Village (五嘉陇村; 五嘉隴村),
- Jiali Village (贾里村; 賈里村),
- Liupan Village (刘畔村; 劉畔村),
- Renli Village (仁里村; 仁里村),
- Chengpan Village (程畔村),
- Yuhu Village (玉湖村).

== Transportation ==
The Chaoshan Station of the China High-Speed Railway is located in Shaxi, on the Xiamen-Shenzhen line.

== See also ==
- Chaozhou
- Chaoan
- Denggang Town
