= Longwen, Zhangzhou =

District in Fujian, China

Longwen 龙文区
- District
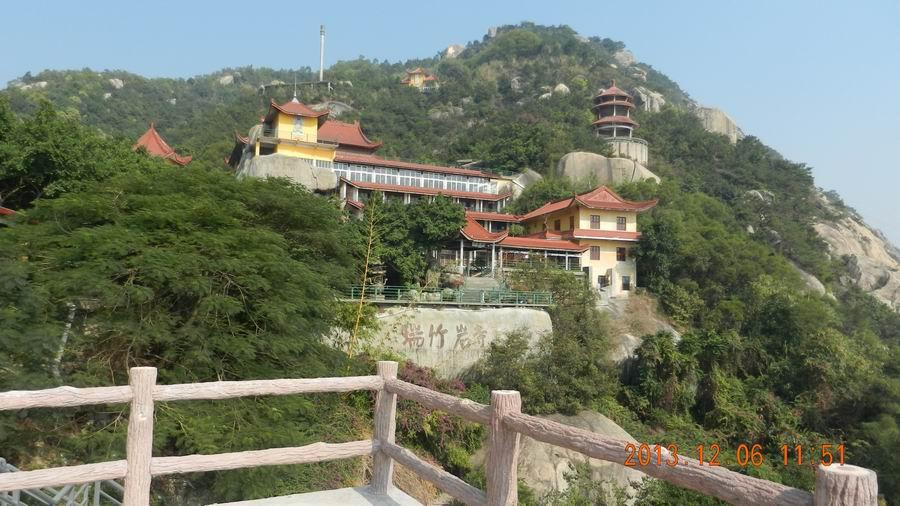

- Location in Fujian
- Coordinates: 24°30′11″N 117°42′36″E
- Country: People's Republic of China
- Province: Fujian
- Prefecture-level city: Zhangzhou

Area
  - Total: 112.8 km^{2} (43.6 sq mi)

Population (2020 census)
  - Total: 301,883
  - Density: 2,676/km^{2} (6,932/sq mi)
- Time zone: UTC+8 (China Standard)

Longwen District (simplified Chinese: 龙文区; traditional Chinese: 龍文區; pinyin: Lóngwén Qū; Pe̍h-ōe-jī: Liông-bûn-khu) is a district of Zhangzhou, Fujian province, People's Republic of China.

== Administrative divisions ==
The only subdistrict is Dongyue Subdistrict (东岳街道)

Towns:

- Buwen (步文镇), Lantian (蓝田镇), Chaoyang (朝阳镇), Guokeng (郭坑镇)
