= Chaoyang Subdistrict =

Chaoyang Subdistrict may refer to the following subdistrict names in Chinese cities:

- Chaoyang Subdistrict, Huainan (朝阳街道), a subdistrict in Tianjia'an District (田家庵区), Huainan City, Anhui province.
- Chaoyang Subdistrict, Bengbu (朝阳街道), a subdistrict in Yuhui District (禹会区), Bengbu City, Anhui province.
- Chaoyang Subdistrict, Shizuishan (朝阳街道), a subdistrict in Dawukou District (大武口区), Shizuishan City, Ningxia Hui Autonomous Region.
- Chaoyang Subdistrict, Dazhou (朝阳街道), a subdistrict in Tongchuan District (通川区), Dazhou City, Sichuan province.
- Chaoyang Subdistrict, Mianyang (朝阳街道), a subdistrict in Fucheng District (涪城区), Mianyang City, Sichuan province.
- Chaoyang Subdistrict, Jiayuguan (朝阳街道), a subdistrict in Jiayuguan City, Gansu province.
- Chaoyang Subdistrict, Chongqing (潮阳街道), a subdistrict in Beibei District (北碚区), Chongqing municipality.
- Chaoyang Subdistrict, Kunshan (朝阳街道), a subdistrict in Kunshan City, Jiangsu province.
- Chaoyang Subdistrict, Lianyungang (朝阳街道), a subdistrict in Lianyungang City, Jiangsu province.
- Chaoyang Subdistrict, Gaomi (朝阳街道), a subdistrict in Gaomi City, Shandong province.
- Chaoyang Subdistrict, Linyi (朝阳街道), a subdistrict in Hedong District, Linyi City, Shandong province.
- Chaoyang Subdistrict, Nanning (朝阳街道), a subdistrict in Xingning District (兴宁区), Nanning City, Guangxi Zhuang Autonomous Region.
- Chaoyang Subdistrict, Xining (朝阳街道), a subdistrict in Chengbei District (城北区), Xining City, Qinghai province.
- Chaoyang Subdistrict, Yanji (朝阳街道), a subdistrict in Yanji City, Jilin province.
- Chaoyang Subdistrict, Jingzhou (朝阳街道), a subdistrict in Shashi District (沙市区), Jingzhou City, Hubei province.
- Chaoyang Subdistrict, Yiyang (朝阳街道), a subdistrict in Heshan District (赫山区), Yiyang City, Hunan province.
- Chaoyang Subdistrict, Yongzhou (朝阳街道), a subdistrict in Lingling District (零陵区), Yongzhou City, Hunan province.
- Chaoyang Subdistrict, Yichun (朝阳街道), a subdistrict in Yichun District (伊春区), Yichun City, Heilongjiang province.
- Chaoyang Subdistrict, Tianjin (潮阳街道), a subdistrict in Baodi District (宝坻区), Tianjin municipality.
