= Chaoyang railway station =

Chaoyang railway station can refer to:

- Chaoyang railway station (Guangdong) (潮阳站), a station in Shantou, Guangdong province, China
- Beijing Chaoyang railway station (北京朝阳站), a station in Chaoyang District, Beijing, China
- Liaoning Chaoyang railway station (辽宁朝阳站), a station in Chaoyang, Liaoning province, China

== See also ==
- Chaoyang station (disambiguation)
