= Denggang Town =

Town in Jieyang, China

Coordinates: 23°32′24″N 116°30′56″E

Denggang Town (simplified Chinese: 登岗镇; traditional Chinese: 登崗鎮; pinyin: Dēnggǎng Zhèn) is located in south east China. It is a township-level administrative unit under the jurisdiction of Rongcheng District, Jieyang City, Guangdong Province.

Denggang Town has a population of 63,579 (according to the census in 2020) and a total area of 33.40 km², with the population density of 1,904/km².

== Administrative division ==
Denggang Town has jurisdiction over the following subareas:

- Denggang Community (simplified Chinese: 登岗社区; traditional Chinese: 登崗社區),
- Denggang Village (登岗村; 登崗村),
- Sankeng Village (三坑村),
- Xucuo Village (许厝村; 許厝村),
- Pukou Village (浦口村),
- Yangqi Village (洋淇村),
- Goubian Village (沟边村; 溝邊村),
- Pengcuo Village (彭厝村),
- Pushang Village (埔上村),
- Anle Village (安乐村; 安樂村),
- Huangxi Village (黄西村; 黃西村),
- Guangming Village (光明村),
- Xiqi Village (西淇村),
- Renmei Village (仁美村).

== Airport ==
Jieyang Chaoshan International Airport 揭阳潮汕国际机场
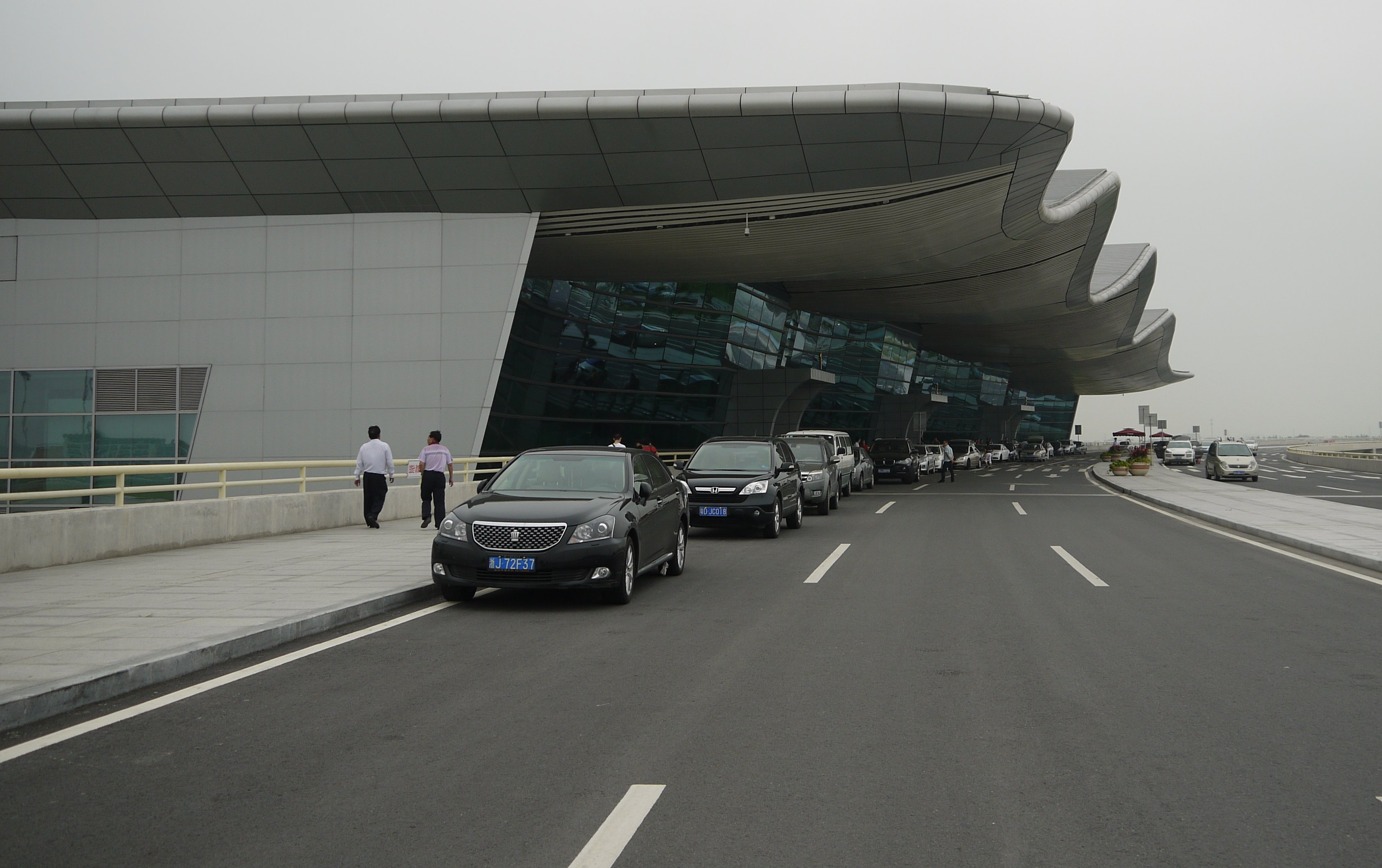
- IATA: SWA; ICAO: ZGOW

Summary
- Interactive map of Jieyang Chaoshan International Airport

The Jieyang Chaoshan International Airport, the largest airport in Eastern Guangdong Province, is located in Denggang. And this is a huge support to the development of the town in various fields.

== See also ==
- Rongcheng, Jieyang
- Jieyang
- Paotai Town (Jieyang)
- Yujiao Town
- Shaxi (Chaozhou)
- List of township-level divisions of Guangdong
