= Yang Chao =

Yang Chao may refer to:

- Yang Chao (figure skater)
- Yang Chao (handballer)
- Yang Chao (footballer)
- Yang Chao (sport shooter)
