= Chaoyang Township =

Chaoyang Township (朝阳乡) could refer to a number of townships in the People's Republic of China:

- Chaoyang Township, Xiuyan County, in Xiuyan Manchu Autonomous County, Liaoning
- Chaoyang Township, Dehui, in Jilin
- Chaoyang Township, Baoqing County, in Heilongjiang
- Chaoyang Township, Zhaozhou County, in Heilongjiang
- Chaoyang Township, Shuangcheng, in Heilongjiang
- Chaoyang Township, Wudalianchi, in Heilongjiang
- Chaoyang Township, Pingyang County, in Zhejiang
- Chaoyang Township, Shangrao, in Xinzhou District, Shangrao, Jiangxi
- Chaoyang Township, Cili County, in Hunan
- Chaoyang Township, Dachu County, in Sichuan
- Chaoyang Township, Guangyuan, in Yuanba District, Guangyuan Sichuan
- Chaoyang Township, Yuechi County, in Sichuan
- Chaoyang Township, Anyue County, in Sichuan
- Chaoyang Township, Guilin, in Qixing District, Guilin, Guangxi
