= Rongcheng, Jieyang =

Rongcheng 榕城区
- District
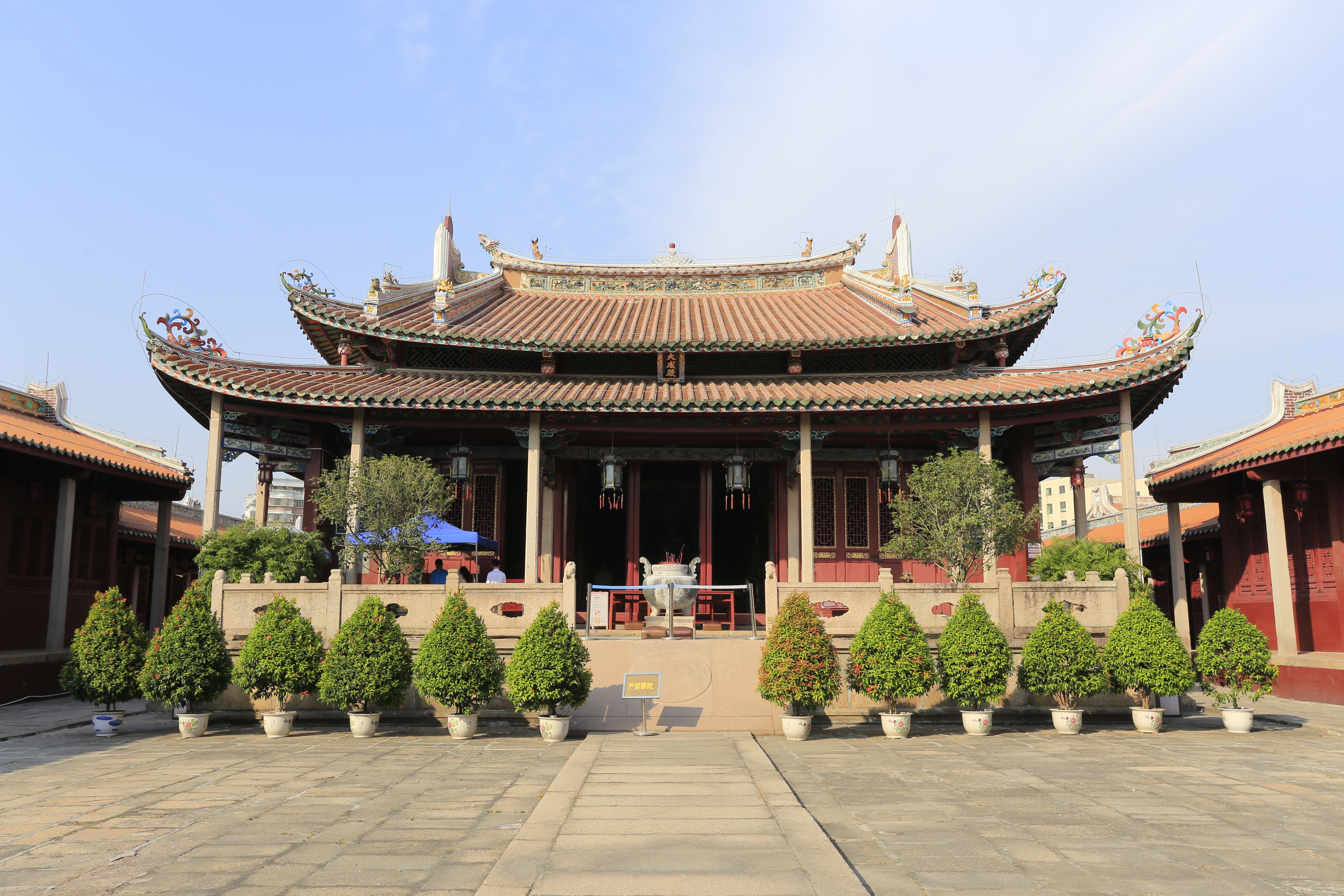

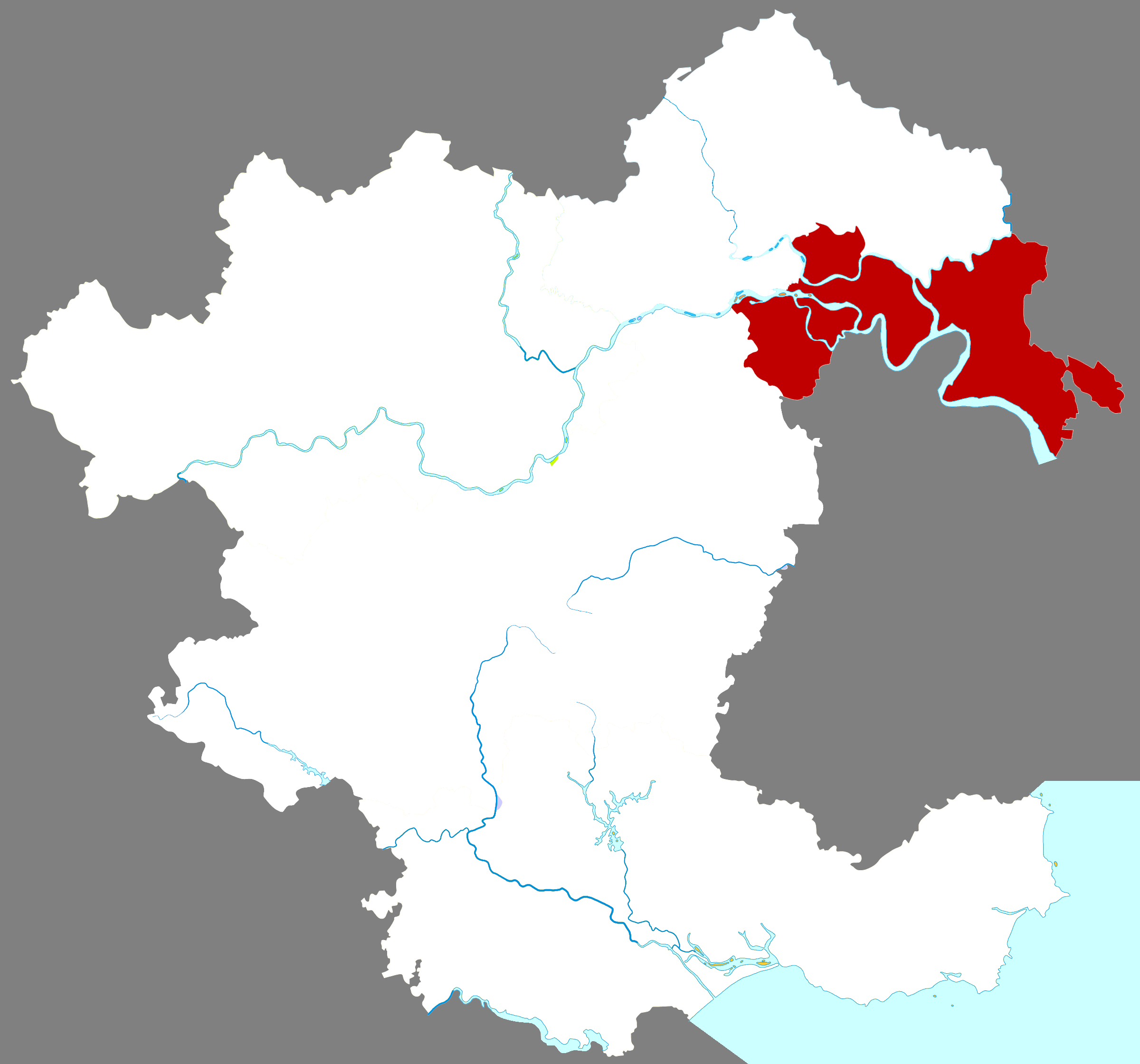
- Location of Rongcheng in Jieyang

- Location in Guangdong
- Coordinates: 23°32′N 116°21′E
- Country: People's Republic of China
- Province: Guangdong
- Prefecture-level city: Jieyang

Area
  - Total: 91.26 km^{2} (35.24 sq mi)

Population (2020)
  - Total: 931,868
  - Density: 10,210/km^{2} (26,450/sq mi)
- Time zone: UTC+8 (China Standard)

Rongcheng District (simplified Chinese: 榕城区; traditional Chinese: 榕城區; pinyin: Róngchéng Qū [ʐʊŋ˧˥.ʈʂəŋ˧˥ tɕy˥˥]; Teochew: iong5 sian5 ku1) is an ancient district on the Rong River in East Guangdong. The district is part of Jieyang City. Located at 116°17′E to 116°23′E longitude and 23°27′N to 23°33′N latitude. Rongcheng is 13.5 kilometers in length and 14 kilometers in height and has a total area of 91.26 square kilometers. According to the 2020 census, the district has a population of 931,868 under its hukou (household registration) system. Amongst them, 735,524 are downtown residents.

== Administrative division ==
Rongcheng District has 10 sub-districts and 4 towns:

- Ronghua subdistrict (榕华街道; 榕華街道
- Xinxing subdistrict (新兴街道; 新興街道)
- Zhongshan subdistrict (中山街道)
- Xima subdistrict (西马街道; 西馬街道)
- Rongdong subdistrict (榕东街道; 榕東街道)
- Xianqiao subdistrict (仙桥街道; 仙橋街道)
- Dongyang subdistrict (东阳街道; 東陽街道)
- Dongsheng subdistrict (东升街道; 東升街道)
- Dongxing subdistrict (东兴街道; 東興街道)
- Meiyun subdistrict (梅云街道; 梅雲街道)
- Yuhu Town (渔湖镇; 漁湖鎮)
- Didu Town (地都镇; 地都鎮)
- Paotai Town (Jieyang) (炮台镇; 炮台鎮)
- Denggang Town (登岗镇; 登崗鎮).

== See also ==
- Former Residence of Ding Richang
- Shuangfeng Temple
- List of administrative divisions of Guangdong
