= Chaoyang, Fujian =

Town in Zhangzhou, Fujian

Coordinates: 24°31′47.9″N 117°42′53.3″E

Chaoyang (simplified Chinese: 朝阳镇; traditional Chinese: 朝陽鎮; pinyin: Cháoyáng Zhèn; lit. 'Facing the Sun') is a town in central Longwen District, Zhangzhou, Fujian Province, People's Republic of China. It is located about 7 kilometres (4.3 mi) east of downtown Zhangzhou and lies in the vicinity of the Xiazhang Expressway (厦漳高速公路), connecting Zhangzhou with Xiamen.

== Administrative divisions ==
There are 1 community and 17 villages in this town:

The only community is Chaoxing Community (朝兴社区)

Villages:

- Fumei (孚美村), Houdian (后店村), Wengjian (翁建村), Pukou (浦口村), Dengke (登科村), Kekeng (科坑村), Zhangbin (漳滨村), Shizhou (石洲村), Dashan (打山村), Hengkeng (恒坑村), Qiaootu (桥头村), Xiyang (西洋村), Liugang (流岗村), Shuting (书厅村), Shijing (石井村), Liushi (六石村), Xinshizhou (新石洲村)
