= Rong River (Guangdong) =

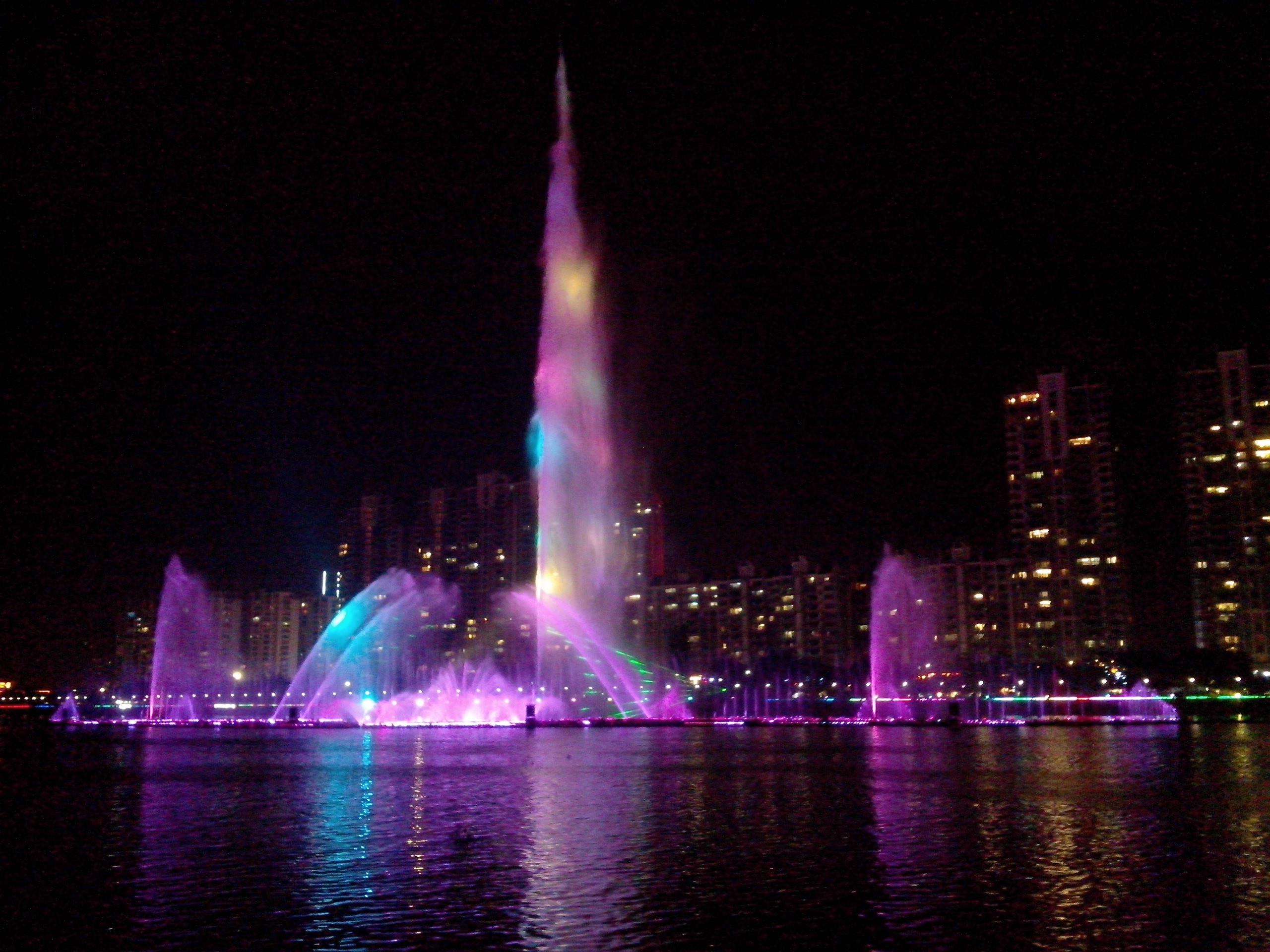
- A large fountain on the Rong River in Jieyang.
- Native name: 榕江 Róngjiāng (Chinese)

Location
- Country: People's Republic of China
- Province: Guangdong

Physical characteristics
- Source
  - location: South of Phoenix Mountain, Luhe County, Guangdong
- Mouth
  - location: Shantou, Guangdong
  - coordinates: 23°19′17″N 116°46′00″E
- Length: 196 km
- Basin size: 4650 km^{2}
- Discharge
  - location: Jiexi East Bridge Park
  - minimum: 0 m^{3}/s
  - maximum: 5160 m^{3}/s

Basin features
- Tributaries
  - left: Shangsha, Wuyun, Hengjiang, Longtan, Wujingfu, Bei
  - right: Shidu, Hongyang

The Rong River, (Chinese: 榕江, tr. Róngjiāng) commonly referred to as the South River (南河, tr. nánhé), formerly known as the Jieyang River (揭阳江, tr. jiēyángjiāng) is located in Guangdong Province of the People's Republic of China and is the second longest river on the eastern coast of Guangdong. The Rong River is formed by the confluence of the South and North Rivers. It is named for the many Banyan trees (róngshù) in the city of Jieyang.

== The North Rong River ==
The North Rong River (榕江北河) originates on the eastern slopes of Tongziyang (桐子洋), in the central section of the Lotus Mountain Range (蓮花山脈) in Fengshun County, Meizhou. It flows from the northwest toward the southeast, passing through Beidou Town (北斗鎮), Tangkeng Town (湯坑鎮), and Tangnan Town (湯南鎮) in Fengshun County; Yuhu Town (玉湖鎮) in Jiedong; and then Yuecheng Town (月城鎮), and Xichang Town (錫場鎮) in the suburbs of Jieyang. From there, it continues toward the urban area of Jieyang, (Rongcheng District). The North Rong River is 92 kilometers long.

== The South Rong River ==
The South Rong River (榕江南河) rises on the southern slopes of Phoenix Mountain (鳳凰山) in eastern Luhe County (陸河縣), Shanwei. It flows from the southwest toward the northeast, passing through Dongkeng Town and Shuichun Town in Luhe County; Wuyun Town in the southwestern suburbs of Jiexi County; the county seat of Jiexi; then Daxi Town (大溪鎮) and Qiankeng Town (錢坑鎮) in the eastern suburbs of Jiexi; Lihu Town (里湖鎮), in the suburbs of Puning; and Mianhu Town (棉湖鎮) in Jiexi. From the western outskirts of Jieyang, it continues toward the urban area of Jieyang (Rongcheng District). Along the way it gathers numerous tributaries, eventually meeting its largest, the North River, at Shuangxizui (雙溪田) in Rongcheng District. From this confluence, the combined waters flow through Niutianyang (牛田洋), enter Shantou Harbour, and finally empty into the South China Sea. The South Rong River is 196 km long.

The drainage basin area of the Rong River is 4650 km^{2} and an average annual discharge of 6.1 billion m^{3}. Typhoons, flooding, waterlogging, and droughts are all common along the Rong River basin.

== History ==
The Rong River has long been an important waterway for Jieyang. People settled along both banks in ancient times, and several Neolithic sites have been discovered in the surrounding area. In 1975, during the construction of the Yuhu Bridge (玉湖大橋), the remains of a Tang‑dynasty river port were unearthed, showing that water transport on the North Rong River had already developed to a considerable scale at that time.

Historic sites are plentiful along the Rong River, attracting many visitors. Among the most famous scenic spots are “Twin Streams under the Bright Moon” (雙溪明月) and “Fishermen’s Songs of Nanpu” (南浦漁歌), both of which were already listed among the “Eight Scenic Views of Chaoshan” during the Ming and Qing dynasties. The famous Teochew opera excerpt Peach Blossom Takes the Ferry (桃花過渡), which is widely known in the Chaoshan region, also takes place on the Rong River. According to the legend and the Teochew opera The Tale of Su Liu Niang, the female lead Su Liu Niang is from Leipu Village (荔浦村) in Rongcheng District, Jieyang, while the male lead Guo Jichun lives across the Rong River in Xilu Town (西臚鎮), Chaoyang. Su Liuniang is forced by her parents to marry Yang Ziliang, and her maid Peach Blossom is ordered to hurry across the Rong River to deliver a message to Guo Jichun. In the excerpt Peach Blossom Takes the Ferry, the ferryman accompanies Peach Blossom as they set out from the north bank of the Rong River, travel downstream along the river for 15 to 20 kilometers, and arrive at the lower reaches on the north bank.

== Tourism ==
The Rong River boasts numerous attractions, mainly concentrated in Rongcheng District, known as the "Water City of Lingnan." However, there are also many worthwhile sites to visit along the river from upstream to downstream, such as:

=== Hot Springs ===
As the North Rong River flows through Tangkeng Town (湯坑鎮), the county seat of Fengshun County, it passes the place from which Tangkeng takes its name — tang (湯), meaning 'hot spring' (溫泉). The springs lie along a geological fault zone of the Lotus Mountain Range in eastern Guangdong, where geothermal water erupts from deep fissures in the earth’s crust. Fengshun is celebrated as the 'Hot Spring City of China' (中國溫泉之城) for its abundance of springs, their wide distribution, high discharge, and high water temperature. Among the many springs, Tangkeng Hot Spring (湯坑溫泉) on the banks of the North Rong River is the most famous and attracts the most visitors, while the Dengwu Hot Spring (鄧屋溫泉) boasts the highest temperatures and the greatest flow.

The hot springs of Fengshun have long stirred the poetic imagination. Literati composed poems and lyrics inspired by these waters. One such piece is Remembering Jiangnan: Tangkeng’s Charms (《憶江南·湯坑好》):

| Fair Tangkeng’s grace — Tang Lake my fondest view. Heat rises skyward, winter’s bite undone in place; Homeward I wander, warmed as by a furnace through, Stains washed away, my heart made new. | 湯坑好， 最戀是湯湖。 熱氣騰空寒入浴， 歸途得意暖如爐。 滌穢更心舒。 |

=== Nanxi Water Village ===
Nanxi Water Village (南溪水鄉) is located in Nanxi Town, Puning City. It is one of the areas where the tributaries of the Rong River are most densely interwoven. With its crisscrossing waterways and constant movement of boats, it has earned the nicknames 'Puning’s Wuzhen' and 'the Little Wuzhen of Lingnan.' The town preserves the authentic landscape of a Chaoshan water village and is an ideal place to experience the rural charm and natural ecology of eastern Guangdong. The town’s waterways stretch for roughly 80 kilometers in total. The liveliest route begins at Dagang Wharf, where visitors board a black‑canopied boat or bamboo raft and glide through narrow water lanes, taking in old ancestral houses, ancient trees, and the surrounding green hills and clear waters. Along the way, the boats pass several traditional villages, including Xinxicun (新溪村), it is recognized as an ancient village of Guangdong, where travellers may disembark to explore its rich cultural heritage and the refined craftsmanship of Chaoshan folk architecture.

=== Huangmanzhai Waterfall Cluster ===
The Huangmanzhai Waterfall Cluster (黃滿寨瀑布群) , also known as the Huangmanqi Waterfall Cluster (黃滿磜瀑布群), is located in Cukeng Village (粗坑村), Jingxiyuan Town (京溪園鎮), Jiexi County. Celebrated as the “Number One Waterfall in Lingnan” (嶺南第一瀑), it is a national AAAA tourist attraction and a provincial‑level geopark, renowned for its magnificent five‑tier cascade system. These five waterfalls stretch across roughly one kilometer of river, descending step by step in distinct forms, with a total drop of more than 300 meters. Among them, the Feihong (飛虹, Flying Rainbow) Waterfall is about 80 meters wide with a nearly 60‑meter drop; its rushing waters often produce rainbows in the sunlight. The Galaxy Waterfall (銀河飛瀑), with the greatest vertical drop—around 120 meters—resembles a silver river plunging from the heavens, its thunderous roar echoing through the valleys.

The scenic area is lush with dense forest, fresh air, and emerald pools. Along the banks stand striking rock formations such as Turtle Rock and Sea‑Dragon Rock. During holidays, the area often hosts Miao (苗族) ethnic song‑and‑dance performances, face‑changing shows, and other folk arts.
