= Guangdong Union Theological Seminary =

Theological college in Guangzhou City, China

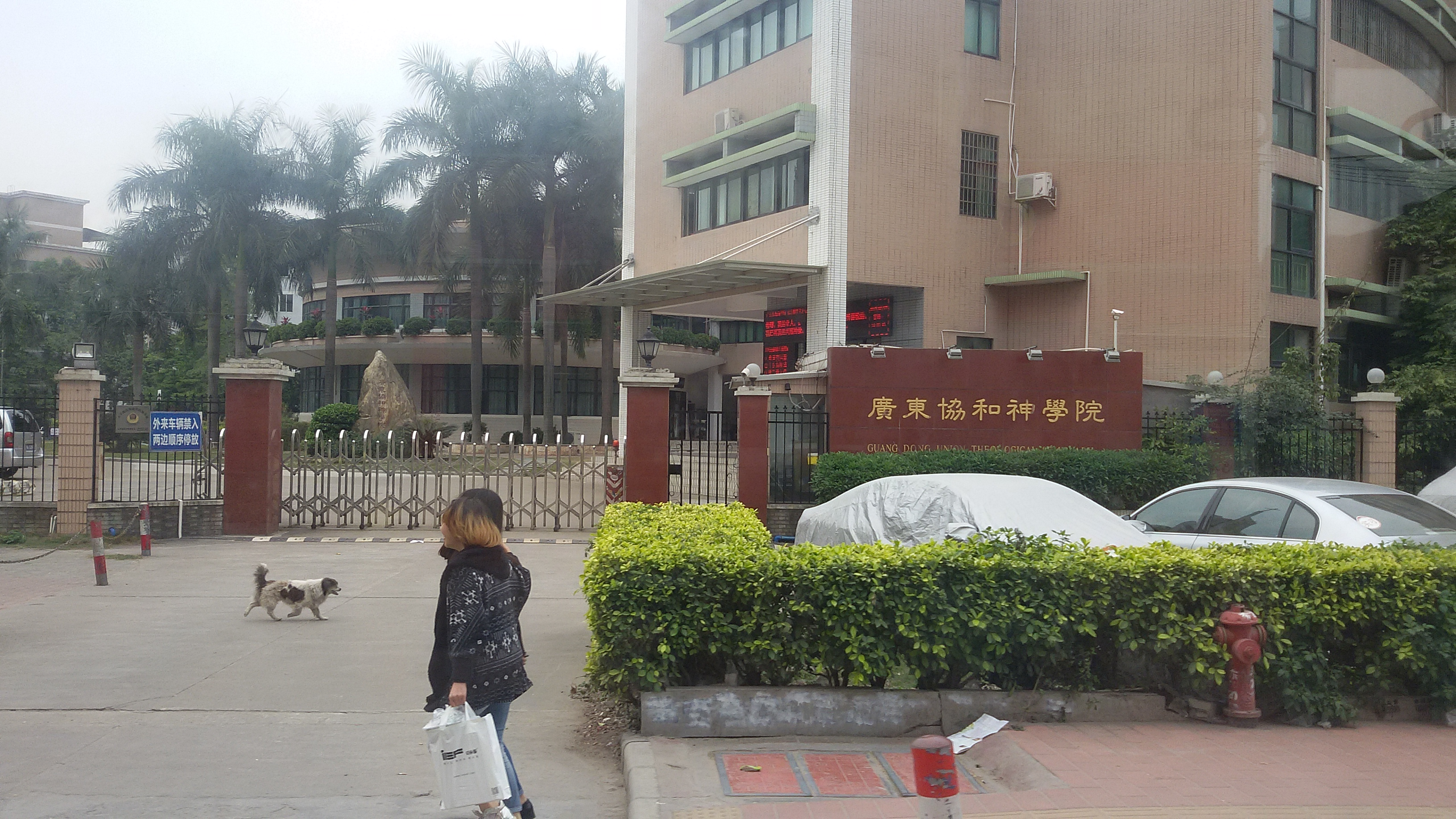
Guangdong Union Theological Seminary

Guangdong Union Theological Seminary (simplified Chinese: 广东协和神学院; traditional Chinese: 廣東協和神學院; pinyin: Guǎngdōng Xiéhé Shénxuéyuàn), formerly Canton Union Theological College, is located in Guangzhou City and sponsored by the Guangdong Christian Council. It is the first provincial-level theological undergraduate college in China and the only theological seminary in Guangdong Province.

== History ==
In 1914, Canton Union Theological College (廣州協和神學院), the predecessor of Guangdong Union Theological Seminary, was established in Guangzhou jointly by eight mission societies (including the American Presbyterian Mission, Canadian Presbyterian Mission, Presbyterian Church in New Zealand, London Mission Society, American Board of Commissioners for Foreign Missions, United Brethren in Christ, Church Mission Society, Wesleyan Methodist Mission Society of England) and three denominational conventions (The Canton Synod of Church of Christ in China, The Chinese Anglican Church in South China Diocese, The Chinese Methodist Church in South China Diocese), hence the word "Union" in the college name. Later, the Baptist Convention of Guangdong and Guangxi Province, Lutheran Synod of Guangdong and Jiangxi Province, Basel Mission and the Rhenish Church also joined in. The college was later merged into Lingnan University (Guangzhou) and became the "Union Theological College of Lingnan University".

In 1951, the seminary became independent from the university and regained the former name "Canton Union Theological College".

In 1960, the seminary was closed until the end of the Cultural Revolution.

In 1986, the seminary was re-established. At the same time, in order to better express its purpose of serving the churches in Guangdong, it was renamed "Guangdong Union Theological Seminary". The seminary at that time was just a two-year-college pastoral staff training class located in Dongshan Christian Church in Guangzhou.

In 1994, the seminary began to offer three-year college courses and moved to the ex-Bishop House of the Anglican Church in Shamian of Guangzhou.

In 2001, the college finally settled down at its current location in Dongping Village, Baiyun District of Guangzhou, and has its own independent campus covering an area of 23 mus, with a construction area of 10,000 square meters. The construction of the school was supported by the government and the Hong Kong Nethersole Foundation, with a total of more than 20 million yuan raised.

In 2003, the seminary journal Guangdong Theological Review was launched. This journal is an important platform for academic exchanges in the college and aims to share the results of theological reconstruction. In 2016, the journal was renamed The Window of Union.

In August 2009, the Theological Seminary was approved by the State Administration of Religious Affairs to be upgraded to become the first provincial theological undergraduate college in the country.

== Present Situation ==
Guangdong Union Theological Seminary offers three-year junior college programs, four-year undergraduate programs, the bridging course for clergy (junior college to undergraduate), and a two-year sacred music program. The general courses include college Chinese, law, politics, history, philosophy, logic, psychology, religious rules, patriotic education, Socialist theory, P.E. lessons and vocal lessons. etc. Professional courses include: Bible background study, introduction to the Old Testament & New Testament, study of different books in the Bible, O.T. theology and N.T. theology; systemic theology, Christian ethics, the construction of Chinese Christian theological thoughts; western church history, Chinese church history, history of Christian thoughts; pastoral psychology, liturgy, hermeneutics, preaching, spiritual theology, church administration; basic English, theological English, basic music theory, sacred music, etc. The purpose is to cultivate pastoral talents for Guangdong Province who are patriotic and religious, have certain attainments in Christian theology, and can cultivate believers in the truth way. There are currently more than 300 students enrolled, mainly from Guangdong Province. Since its resumption in 1986, the college has trained more than a thousand graduates, most of whom have stayed to serve in churches in the province. About a quarter of them have been ordained as pastors or elders.

The seminary currently has 15 full-time teachers, and has also invited 15 university professors or researchers to serve as visiting teachers. The current president is Rev. Xu Jieping.

The journal of the seminary is "Window of Union", which covers the columns of "Sinicization of Christianity", "Biblical Studies", "Theological Thinking", "Church History", "Spirituality", "Pastoral Counseling", and "Christian Art", "Translation and Introduction of Original Classics", "Teaching Exchange", etc.

On the campus, there are teaching buildings, student and staff dormitories, dining halls, the library, the Union Church, indoor and outdoor sports venues, etc. The church is open to the public. The library has a collection of nearly 60,000 hard copy books in Chinese and foreign languages, and more than 200,000 electronic books and 33 e-journals. There is also access to over 1000,000 e-books from a shared resource used by many universities.

== See also ==
- List of Protestant theological seminaries in China
- Nanjing Union Theological Seminary
