= Tianhe Church =

- Christian Church of Guangzhou Tianhe
- 广州基督教天河堂
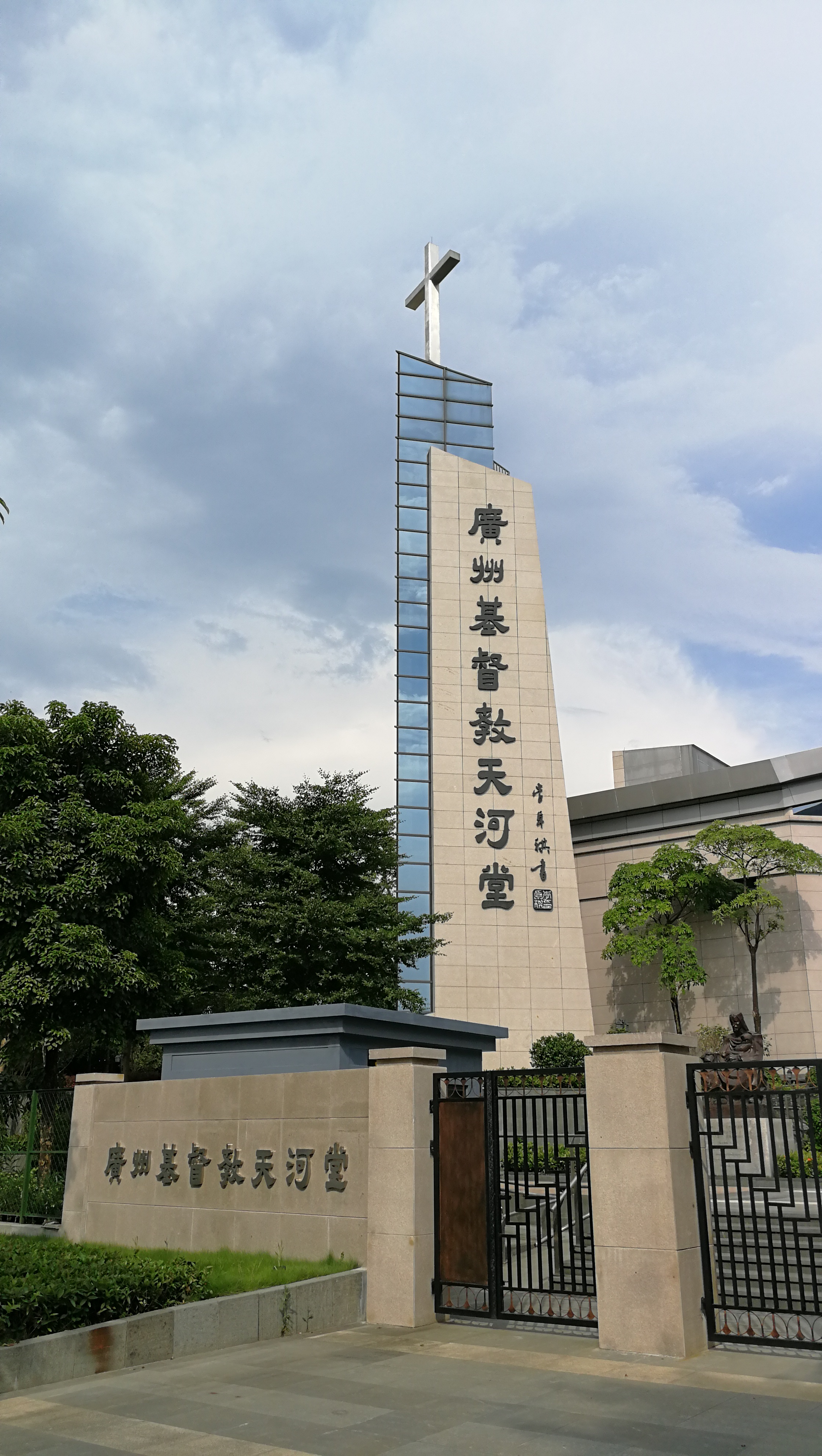
- The cross on the bell tower of Tianhe Church
- Tianhe Church
- Location: No. 16-20 Daguan Middle Road, Tianhe District, Guangzhou, Guangdong Province
- Country: People's Republic of China
- Denomination: Protestantism

Architecture
- Functional status: Active
- Architect: Wing-ning Pang
- Architectural type: Comprehensive church Theology research center
- Style: Modern architecture
- Groundbreaking: 15 Sep. 2007
- Completed: 14 Jan. 2017
- Construction cost: 29 million / 110 million RMB

Specifications
- Capacity: 3000 people

Clergy
- Pastor(s): Feng Hao, Lin Bingsheng, Yang Yongchun (2017)

Tianhe Church
- Traditional Chinese: 廣州基督教天河堂
- Simplified Chinese: 广州基督教天河堂
Transcriptions
Standard Mandarin
- Hanyu Pinyin: Guǎngzhōu Jīdūjiào Tiānhétáng
Yue: Cantonese
- Jyutping: gwong2 zau1 gei1 duk1 gaau3 tin1 wo4 tong4

Christian Church of Guangzhou Tianhe (Chinese: 广州基督教天河堂), also known as Tianhe Church (天河堂), is a Christian TSPM Church in Guangzhou, China. It is located at No. 16-20 Daguan Middle Road, Tianhe District, and hence its name. It is considered the largest church in Guangzhou.

Tianhe Church is the first Christian church built in Guangzhou after 1949, and is the first church in Tianhe District. The predecessor of the church was Xiaogang Church (小港堂) in Haizhu District. Since the church was seriously damaged, it was rebuilt in another place. On September 15, 2007, the foundation stone ceremony of the new church was held, and the construction started on February 10, 2009. It was finally opened on January 14, 2017, officially.

== Architecture ==
The new church was designed by Wing-ning Pang (彭永宁). It covers an area of 8,830 square meters, including the Main Hall, Deputy Hall, Bell Tower, Training Building and supporting management room, 5 buildings in total. The total floor area is 9,431 square meters, making it the largest-ever church in Guangzhou.

== Church Activities ==
The table below was entered on August 21, 2017. The content may change at any time. The actual schedule of the day shall prevail.

Day	Time (CST)	Location	Activities
Sunday	9:30-11:00	Main Hall	Sunday Worship (Mandarin)
Sunday	9:30-11:00	A107	Children's Sunday School
Sunday	14:00-16:30	Lecture Hall	Youth party
Wednesday	8:00-9:00	B204	Women's choir
Wednesday	9:15-10:30	B205	Bible study

== Gallery ==
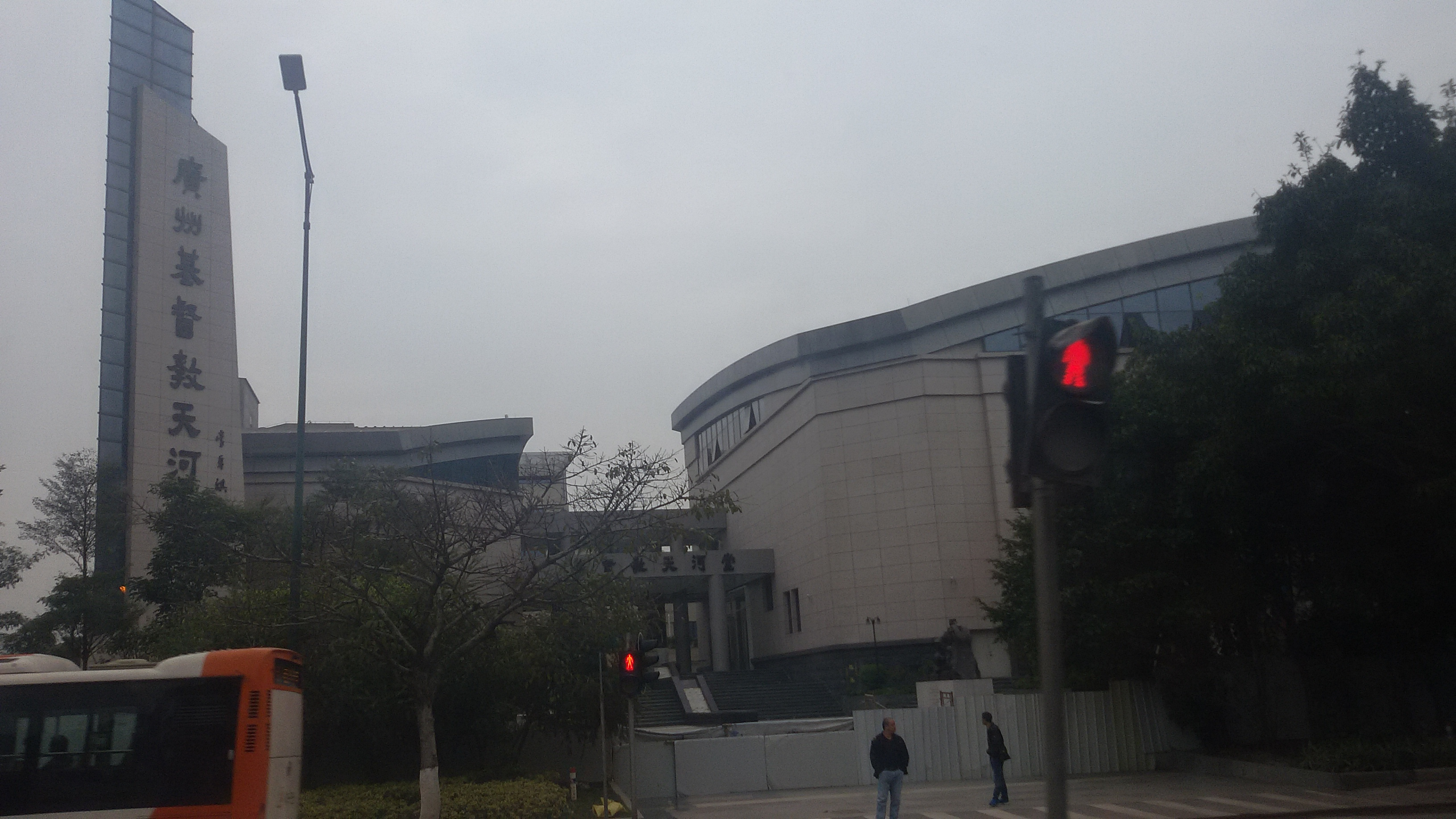
Under Construction

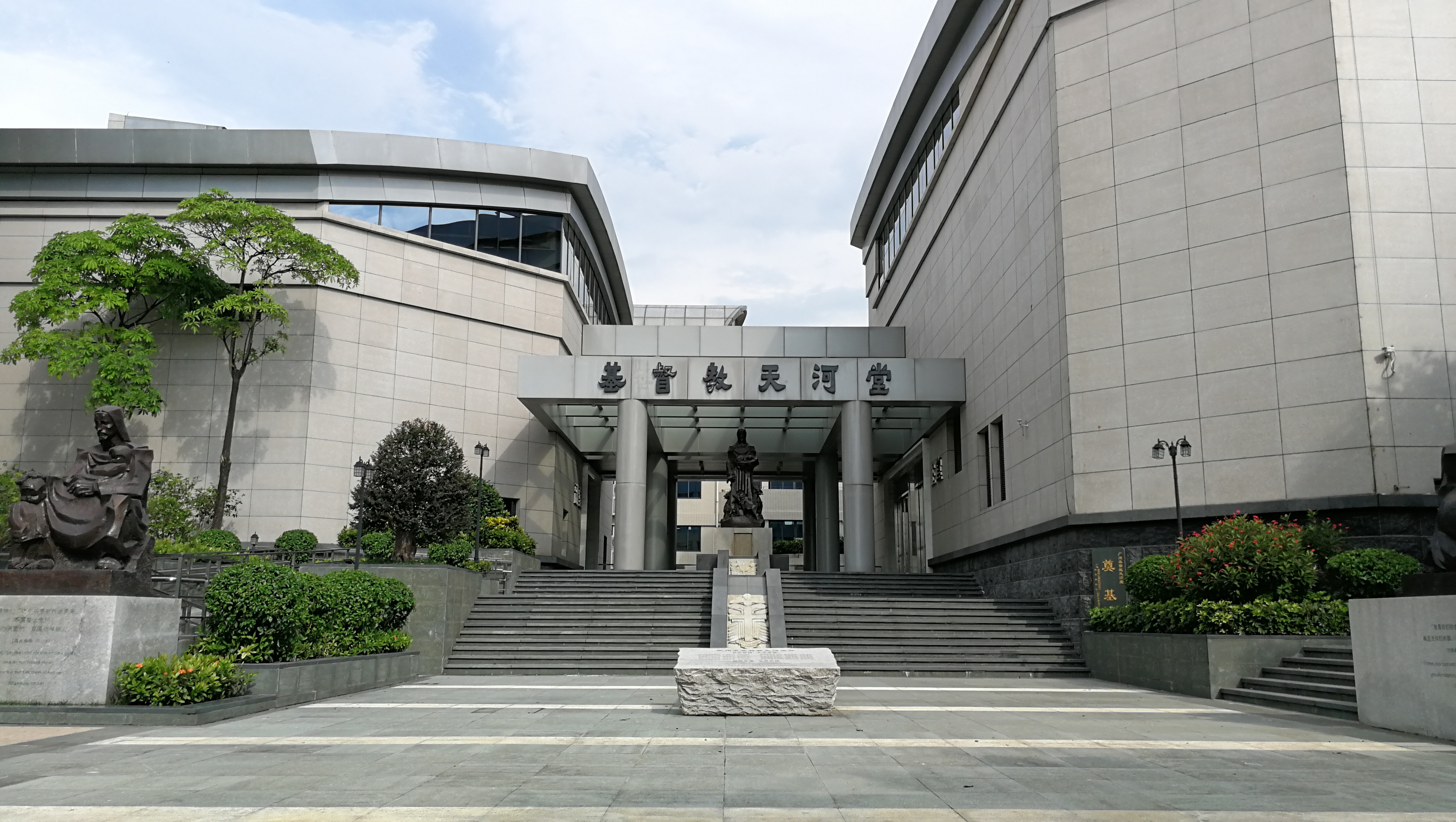
Inside the front gate

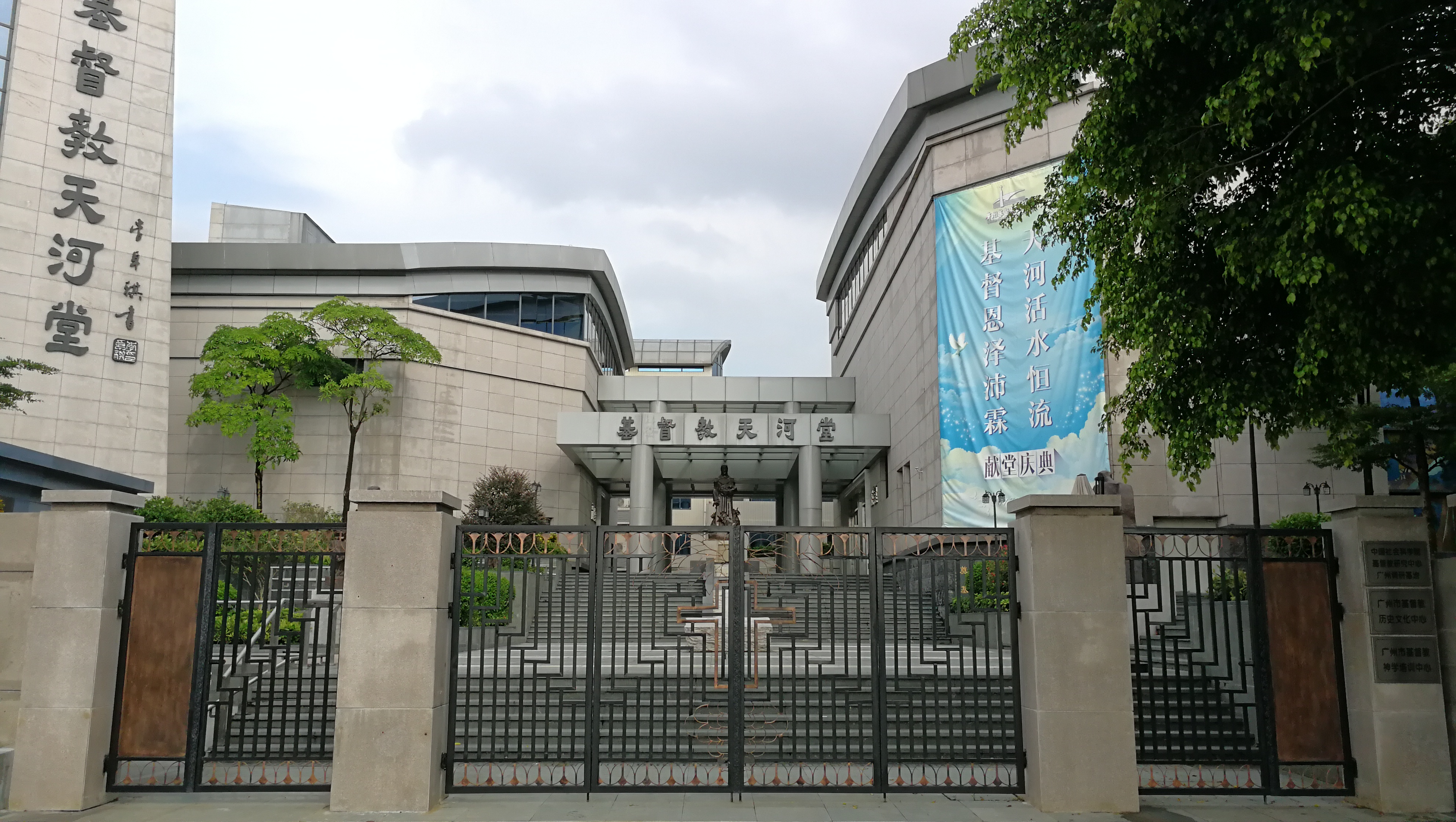
Outside of the front gate

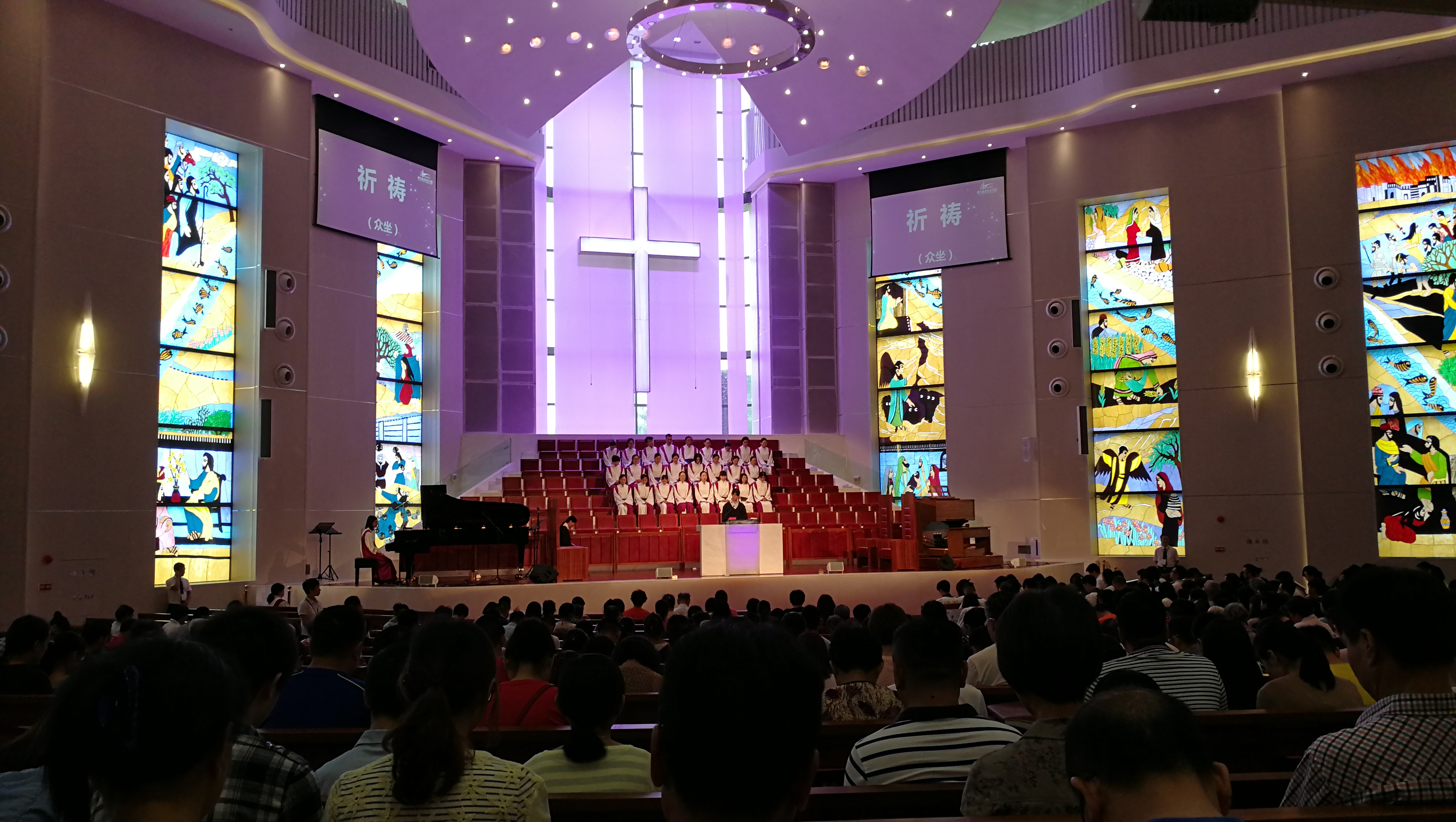
Main Hall

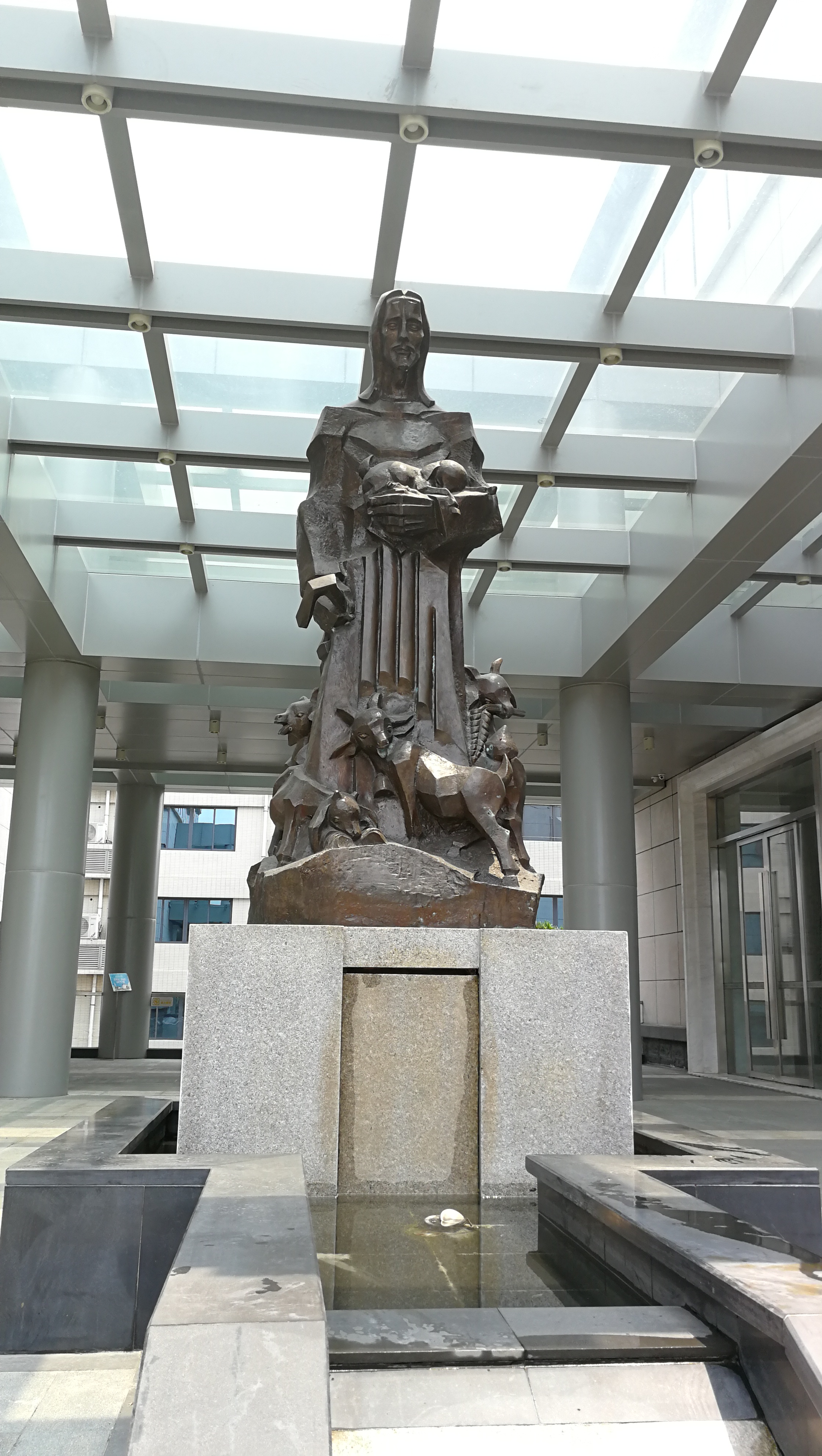
The sculpture "Jesus is a Good Shepherd" (John 10:11)

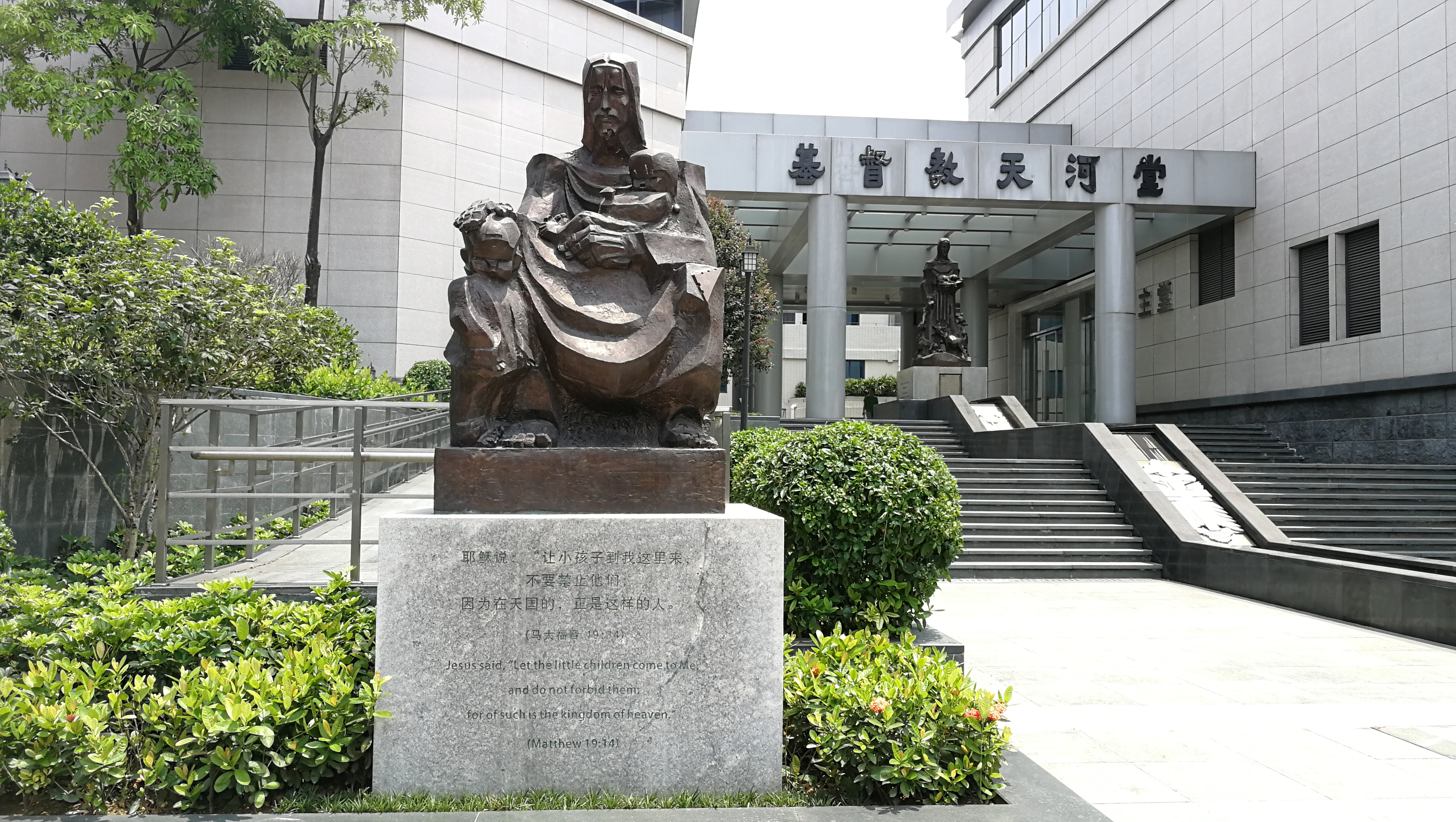
The sculpture "Jesus Loves Children" (Luke 18: 16)

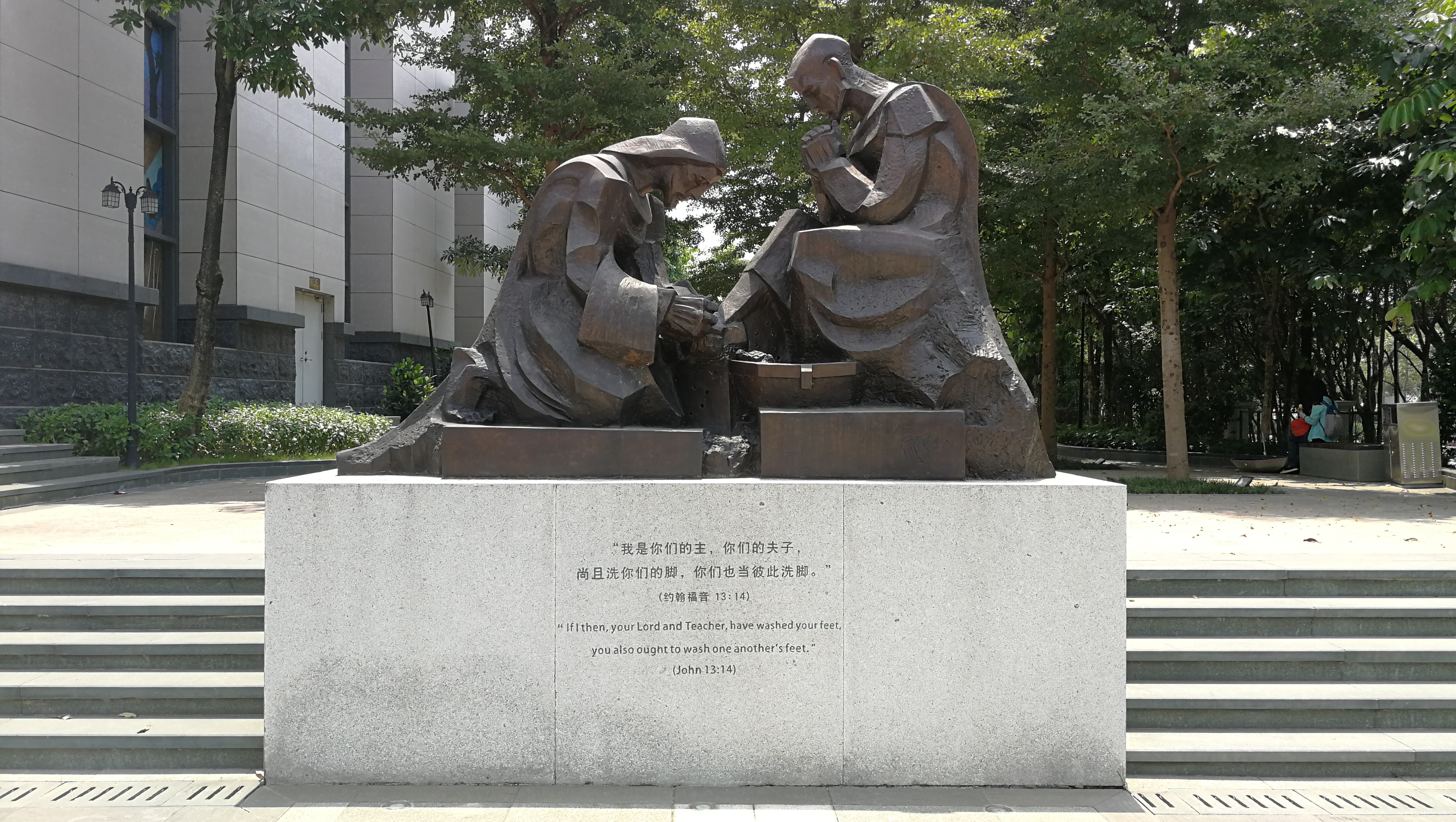
The sculpture "Jesus Washes Feet for Disciples" (John 13:14)

== See also ==
- Dongshan Church (Guangzhou)
