= Shamian =

Island in the Liwan district of Guangzhou, Guangdong, China

Coordinates: 23°06′34″N 113°14′22″E

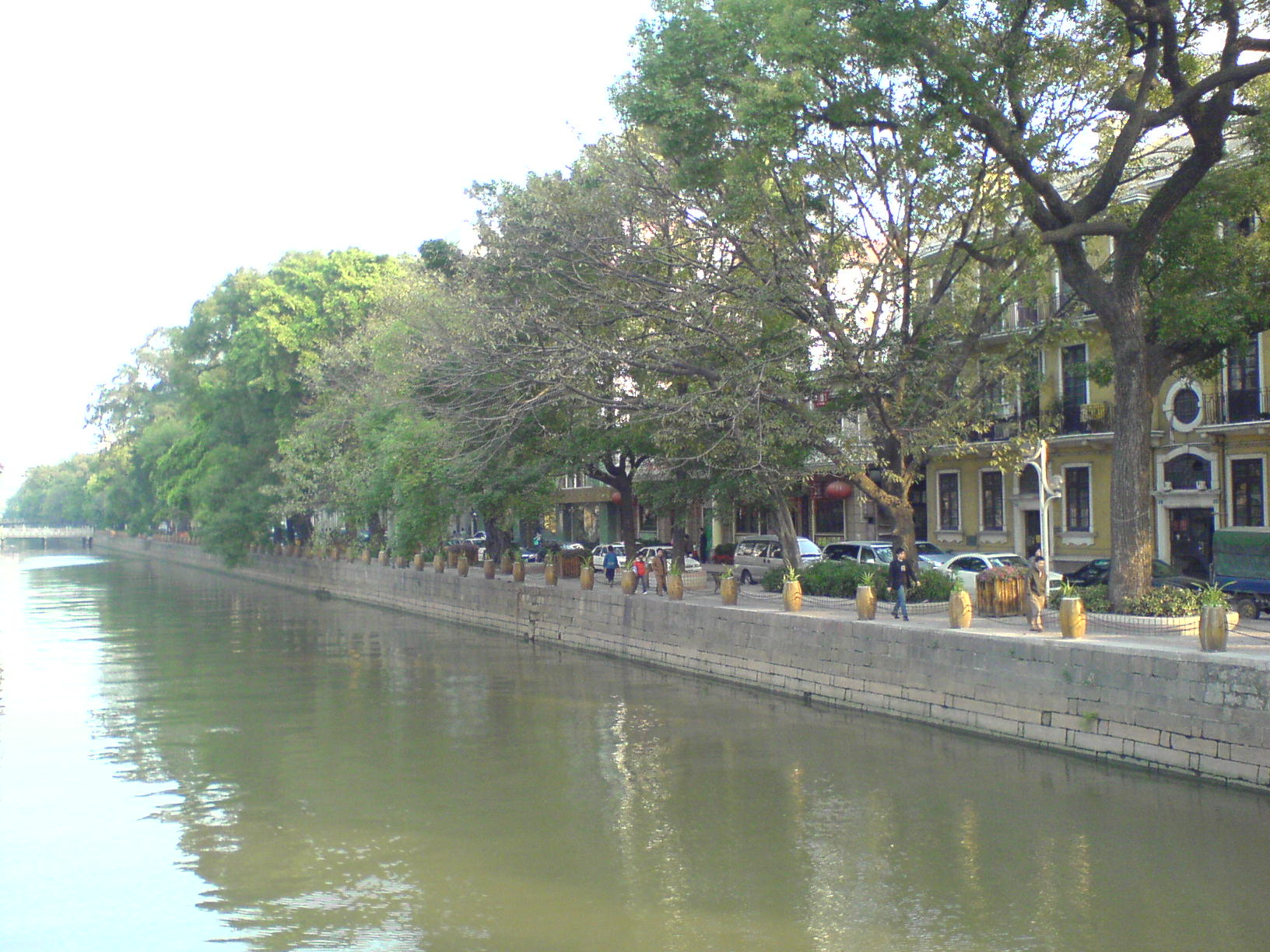
- Shamian viewed from Guangzhou mainland.
- Chinese: 沙面
- Literal meaning: sandy surface
Transcriptions
Standard Mandarin
- Hanyu Pinyin: Shāmiàn
- Wade–Giles: Sha-mien
Yue: Cantonese
- Yale Romanization: Sāmín
- Jyutping: saa1 min2
- Canton Romanization: sa^{1}min^{2}
- IPA: [sa˥min˧˥]

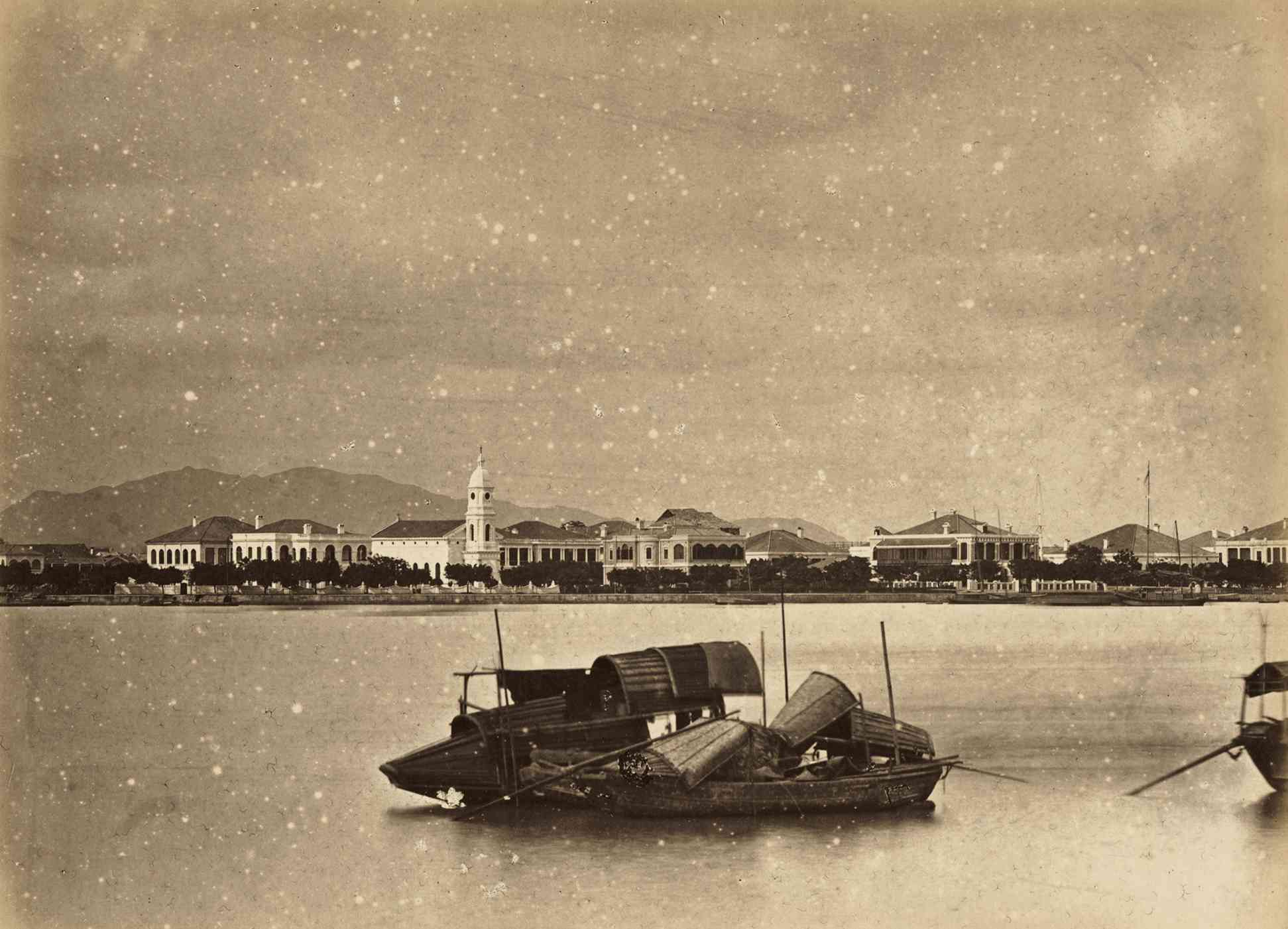
Shamian Island in the 1870s by Lai Afong

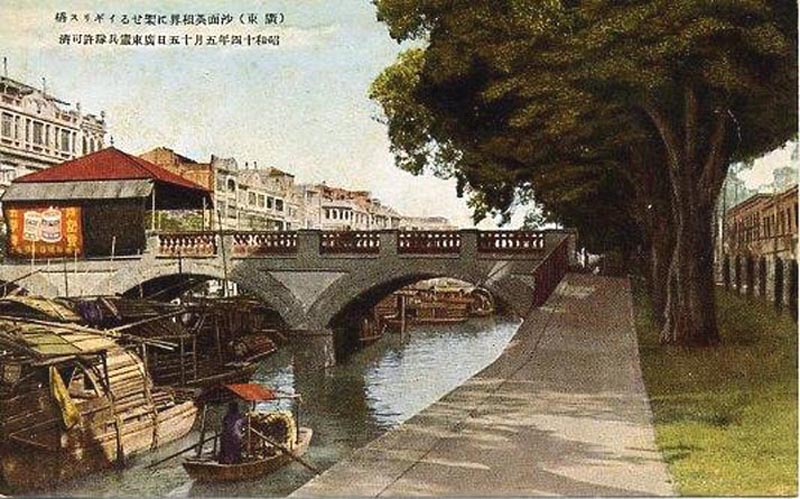
The West Bridge, also called the "English Bridge", in 1939

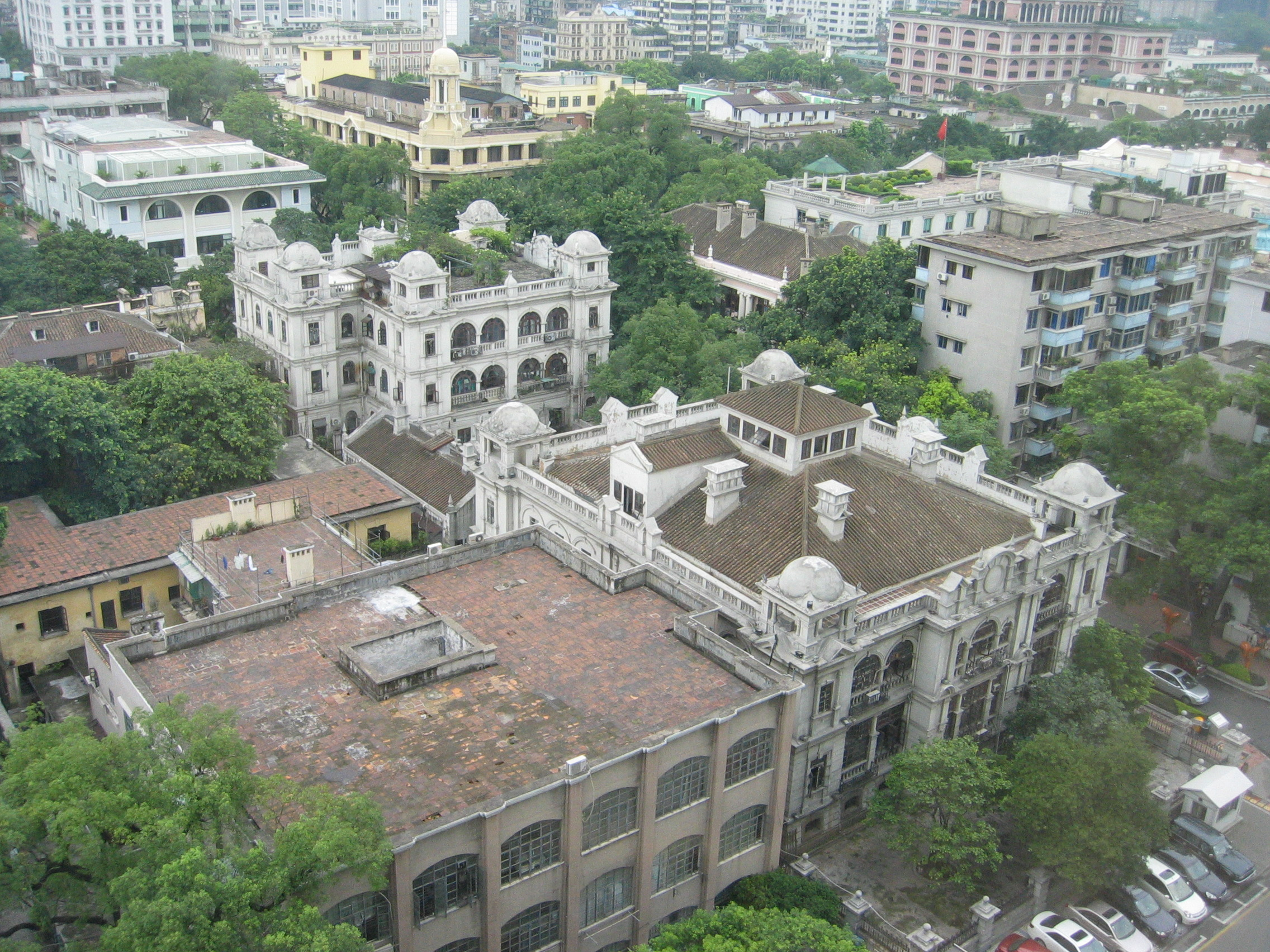
Buildings on Shamian Island in 2007

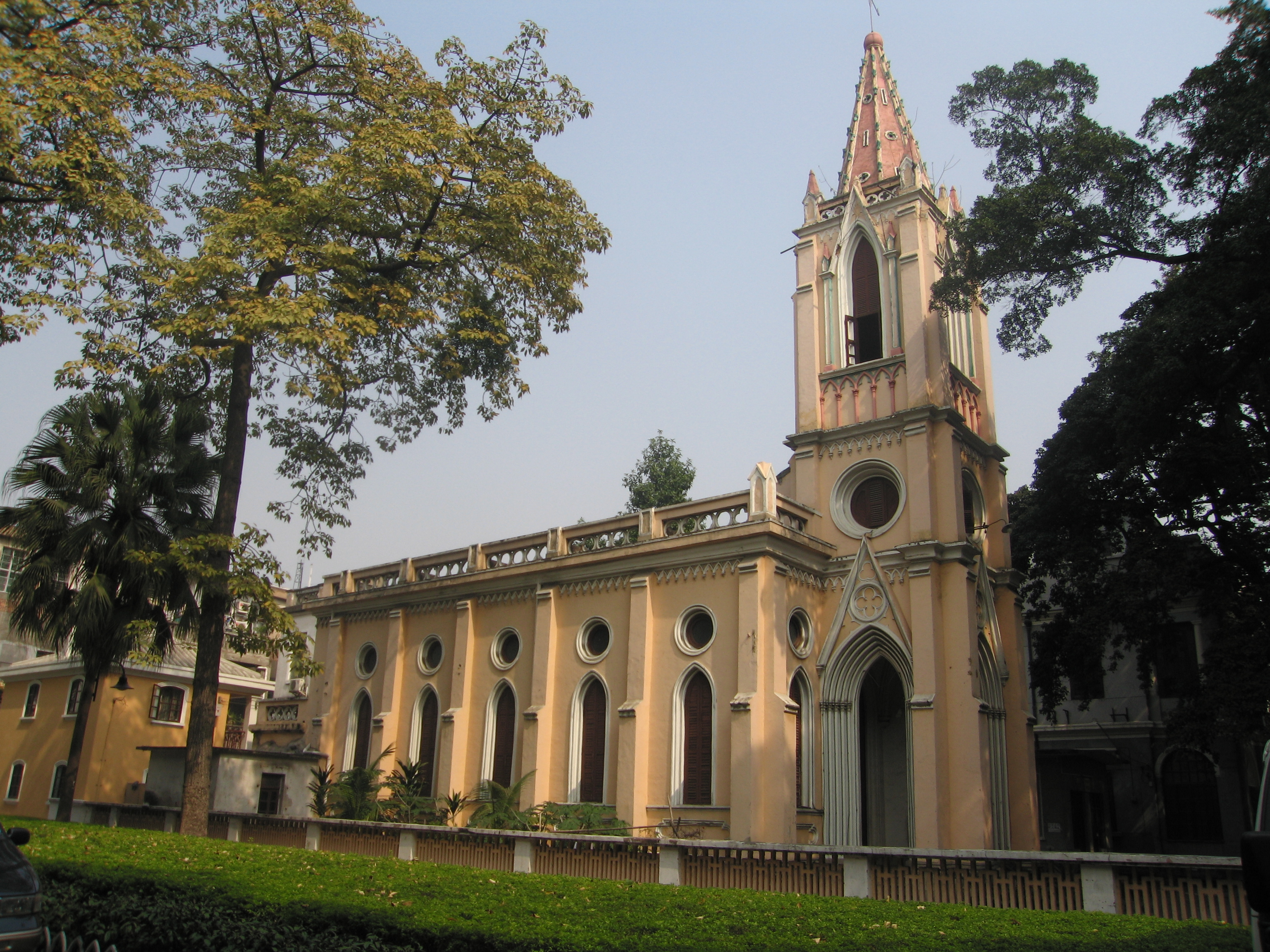
Our Lady of Lourdes Chapel on Shamian Island

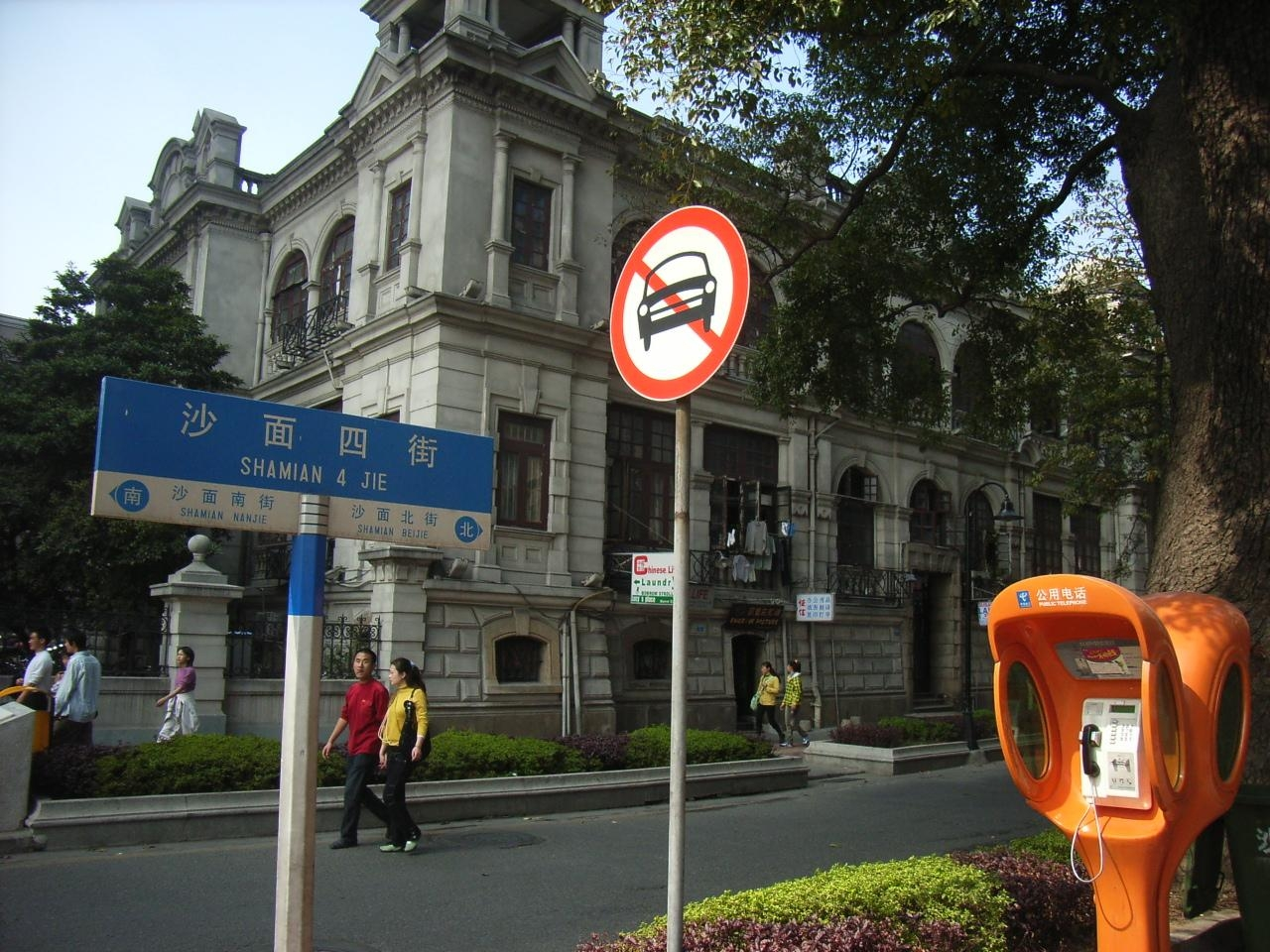
Former German consulate and Asiatic Petroleum Company building

Shamian (also romanized as Shameen or Shamin, both from its Cantonese pronunciation) is a sandbank island in the Liwan District of Guangzhou, Guangdong, China. The island's name literally means "sandy surface" in Chinese.

The territory was divided into two concessions given to France and the United Kingdom by the Qing government in the 19th century (1859–1943). The island is a gazetted historical area that serves as a tranquil reminder of the colonial European period, with quiet pedestrian avenues flanked by trees and lined by historical buildings in various states of upkeep. The island is the location of several hotels, a youth hostel, restaurants and tourist shops selling curios and souvenirs.

== Geography ==
The island covers an area of 0.3 km^{2}, 900 m from east to west, and 300 m from north to south. It is bordered in the south by the Pearl River, and it is separated from the mainland by a canal.

== History ==
=== Early era (pre-1859) ===
Shamian Island was an important port for Guangzhou's foreign trade from the Song to the Qing dynasty. From the 18th to the mid 19th century, the foreigners lived and did business in a row of houses known as the Thirteen Factories, on the banks of the Pearl River to the east the present Shamian, which was then an anchorage for thousands of boat people. In 1859, Great Britain and France dug an artificial river (now called Shajichong) to the north, making it an island. Since then, Shamian became a strategic point for city defense during the First and Second Opium Wars. The British captured the Shamian Fort in the Canton River operations in March 1841 during the First Opium War. In the 1847 expedition to Canton, they seized the Shamian batteries along with the rest of the forts guarding the city. In the first armed conflict of the Second Opium War, the British recaptured the forts in 1856.

=== Concession era (1859-1946) ===
In 1859, the territory was divided in two concessions given to France and the United Kingdom (of which 3/5 belonged to the British and 2/5 to the French). It was connected to the mainland by two bridges, which were closed at 10pm as a security measure. The British arch bridge, also called the "Bridge of England" and built in 1861, to the north was guarded by Sikh police officers, and the French bridge to the east was guarded by Vietnamese (Cochinchina) recruits with the Troupes coloniales.

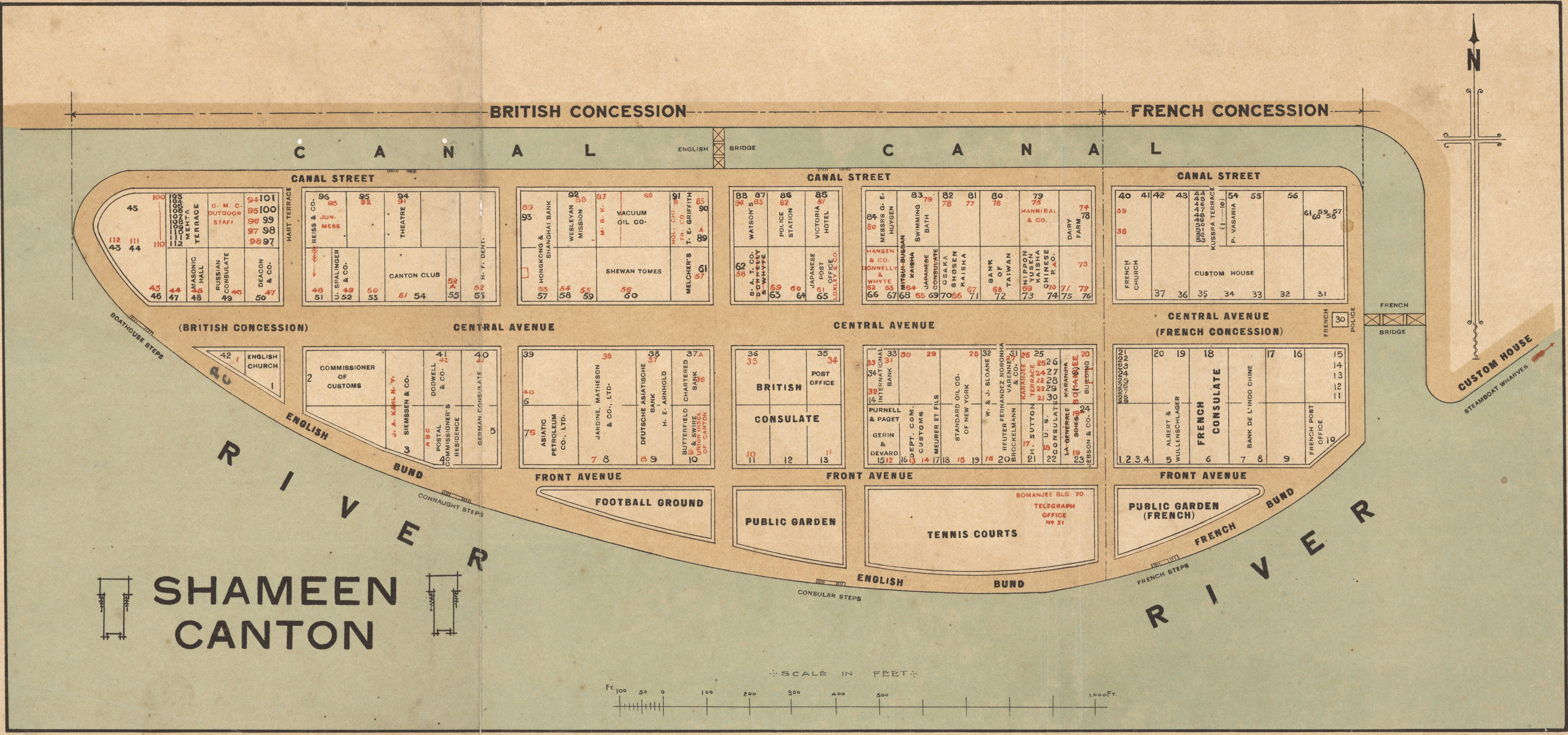
1920s map of "Shameen", showing the location of the British and French concessions

Trading companies from Britain, the United States, France, Holland, Italy, Germany, Portugal, and Japan built stone mansions along the waterfront. The construction on the island was characterized by climate-adapted but Western-plan detached houses with hipped roofs and large verandahs.

The island was the scene of fighting during the "June 23 incident" in 1925.

The ambassadors of the United Kingdom to China, Sir Horace James Seymour (薛穆爵士) and the Minister of Foreign Affairs of the Republic of China, T. V. Soong (宋子文) signed “Sino-British Treaty for the Relinquishment of Extra-Territorial Rights in China" at Chongqing and handed British concessions of Shamian back to China by law on 11 January 1943. As Shamian was controlled by Wang Jingwei regime, the puppet state of Japanese Empire then, after the surrender of Japan, National Revolutionary Army received Shamian in fact on 5 September 1945.

On 28 February 1946, the ambassadors of France to China, Jacques Meyrier (梅礼霭) and the Minister of Foreign Affairs of the Republic of China, Wang Shijie (王世杰) signed "Sino-French Treaty for the Relinquishment of Extraterritoriality in China and Related Rights" at Chongqing and handed French concessions of Shamian back to China.

On 24 October 1946, Guangzhou Municipal Government released an announcement to took back Shamian formally. The government also established special district office and police sub-bureau at Shamian for the administration of Shamian.

=== Modern history (1946-present) ===
After 1949, the mansions of Shamian became government offices or apartment houses and the churches were turned into factories.

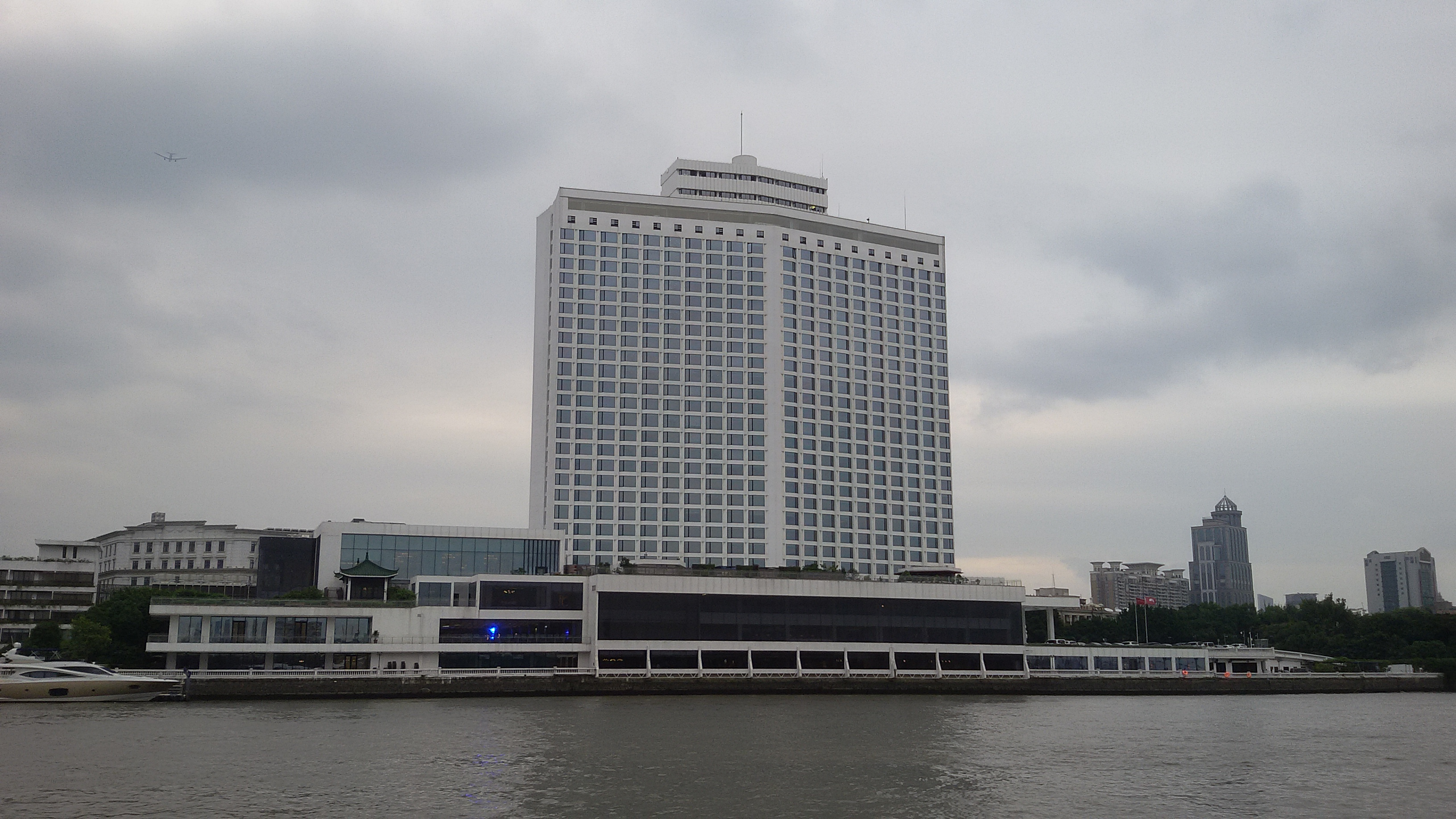
White Swan Hotel

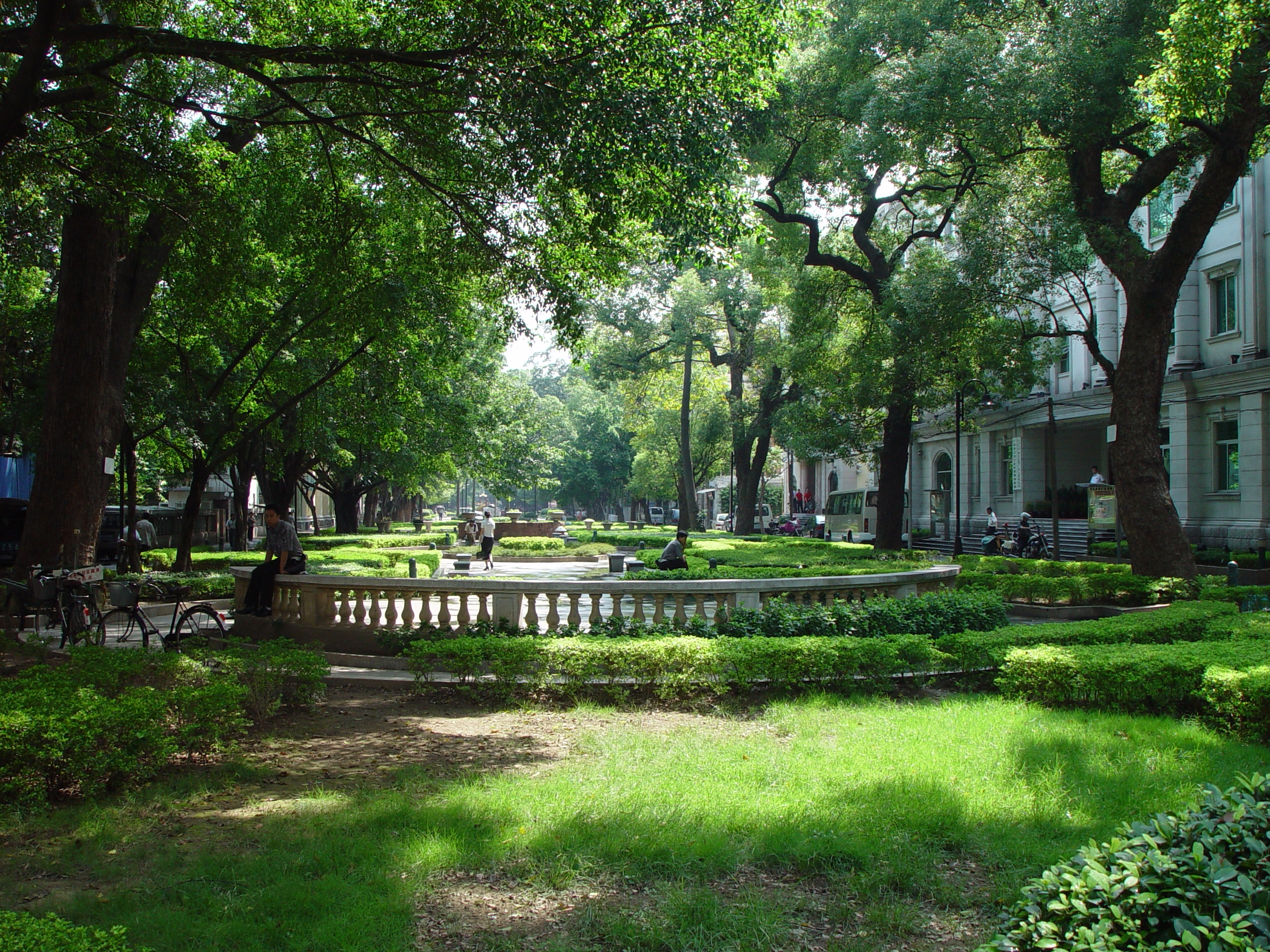
A public garden on Shamian Island

== Features ==
=== Religious buildings ===
The French Catholic chapel, Our Lady of Lourdes Chapel (露德圣母堂; 露德聖母堂), has been restored and stands on the main boulevard. Located at the French end of the island, it was completed in 1892.

The British Protestant church, Christ Church Shameen (沙面堂; Shāmiàn Táng; saa1 min2 tong4), was built in 1865.

=== Government ===
The community includes the Shamian Police Station (沙面派出所; Shāmiàn Pàichūsuǒ; saa1 min2 paai3 ceot1 so2).

=== Consulates ===
While Shamian Island in history housed the majority of the consulates in Guangzhou, all have since moved out except the consulate general of Poland which remains at No. 63 Shamian Main Street.

Former consulates on the Island include:

- Czechoslovakia. The Czech Consulate was for some time located at No. 1 North Shamian Street, in a 1911 building, which later hosted the North Korean trade delegation in Guangzhou.
- France. No. 20 South Shamian Street.
- Poland. No. 63 Shamian Main Street.
- Germany. No. 59 Shamian Main Street South. The building also housed the Asiatic Petroleum Company.
- Japan. No. 22 South Shamian Street.
- Norway. No. 54 Shamian Main Street North.
- Portugal. No. 42 South Shamian Street.
- Soviet Union. The Soviet Consulate was for some time located at 68 Shamian Main Street North, in a 1916 building.
- United Kingdom. No. 44-46 South Shamian Street.
- United States. The U.S. Consulate Guangzhou was located at No. 56 Shamian Main Street North from 1873 to 1938, and later during several months in 1949. In April 1990, the consulate moved again to Shamian Island, where it occupied the Consulate Tower, a new building at No. 1 Shamian South Street, built on reclaimed land near the Pearl River and next to the White Swan Hotel. In 2005, the Consular Section of the Consulate moved to a location in Tianhe District. In July 2013, the consulate was relocated to a new building within Zhujiang New Town. The consulate's location made Shamian Island a hub for U.S. families adopting children from China.

=== Education ===
Schools in the community include Shamian Primary School (沙面学校; 沙面學校; Shāmiàn Xuéxiào; Saa1min2 Hok6haau6) and Shamian Experimental Primary School (沙面实验学校; 沙面實驗學校; Shāmiàn Shíyàn Xuéxiào; saa1 min2 sat6 jim6 hok6 haau6).

=== Recreation ===
Shamian Park (沙面公园; 沙面公園; Shāmiàn Gōngyuán; saa1 min2 gung1 jyun2) and the Shamian Tennis Courts (沙面网球场; 沙面網球場; Shāmiàn Wǎngqiúchǎng; saa1 min2 mong5 kau4 coeng4) are in the community.

=== Statues ===
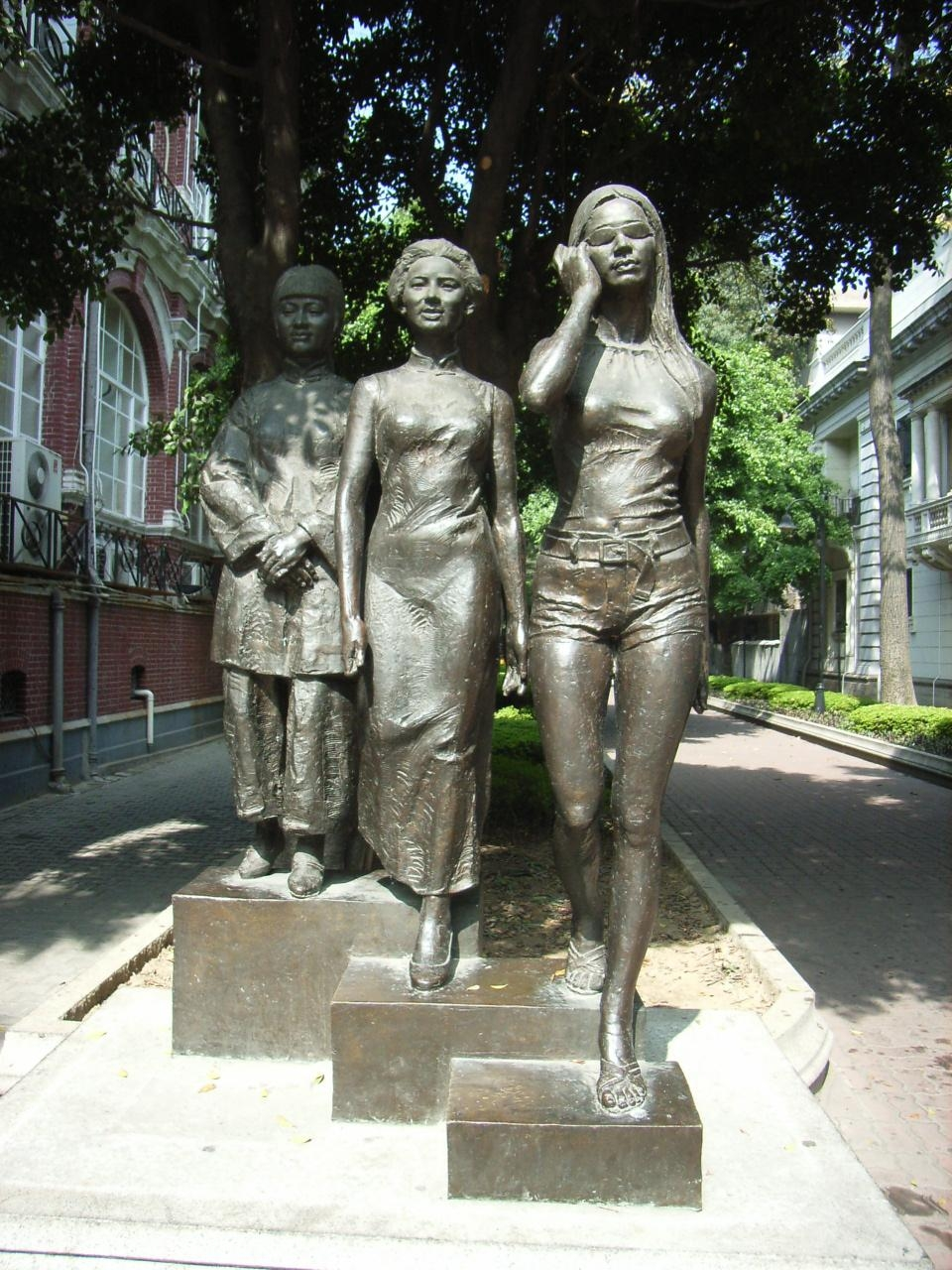
Statues on Shamian Island.

Various bronze statues are scattered around the island which depict life as it was during earlier periods on the island, as well as from more recent times. For example, one statue entitled "A gentleman, a lady and a darn woman" shows a Western couple watching a Chinese woman darning cloth. Another depicts the changing appearances and stature of Chinese women, with a woman from colonial times in traditional clothing, a slightly taller woman from the early or mid 20th century wearing a cheongsam, and a relatively tall and slender young Chinese woman wearing shorts and talking on a mobile phone.

== Transportation ==
The three east–west streets of the island, formerly named "Canal Street", "Central Avenue" (a tree-lined boulevard), and "Front Avenue" (originally lined on the riverside by parks) were renamed "Shamian North Road" (Shamian Beijie), "Shamian Main Street" (Shamian Dajie), and "Shamian South Road" (Shamian Nanjie). The five north–south streets are named Shamian 1 Street to Shamian 5 Street.

Huangsha Station of Guangzhou Metro is located within a short walk from the island, via an overpass crossing the busy Liu'ersan Road. There is also a ferry running from Huangsha Pier to Fangcun Pier, which runs every 10 minutes carrying foot-passengers and bicycles. Fares are from 0.5 RMB for a foot passenger and 1 RMB for a passenger with a bike. There are no public buses on the island itself, although there are several nearby bus stops.

== See also ==
- The Bund
- Gulangyu Island, in Xiamen
- Treaty ports
- List of French possessions and colonies
