= Our Lady of Lourdes Chapel, Shamian Island =

- 沙面露德圣母堂
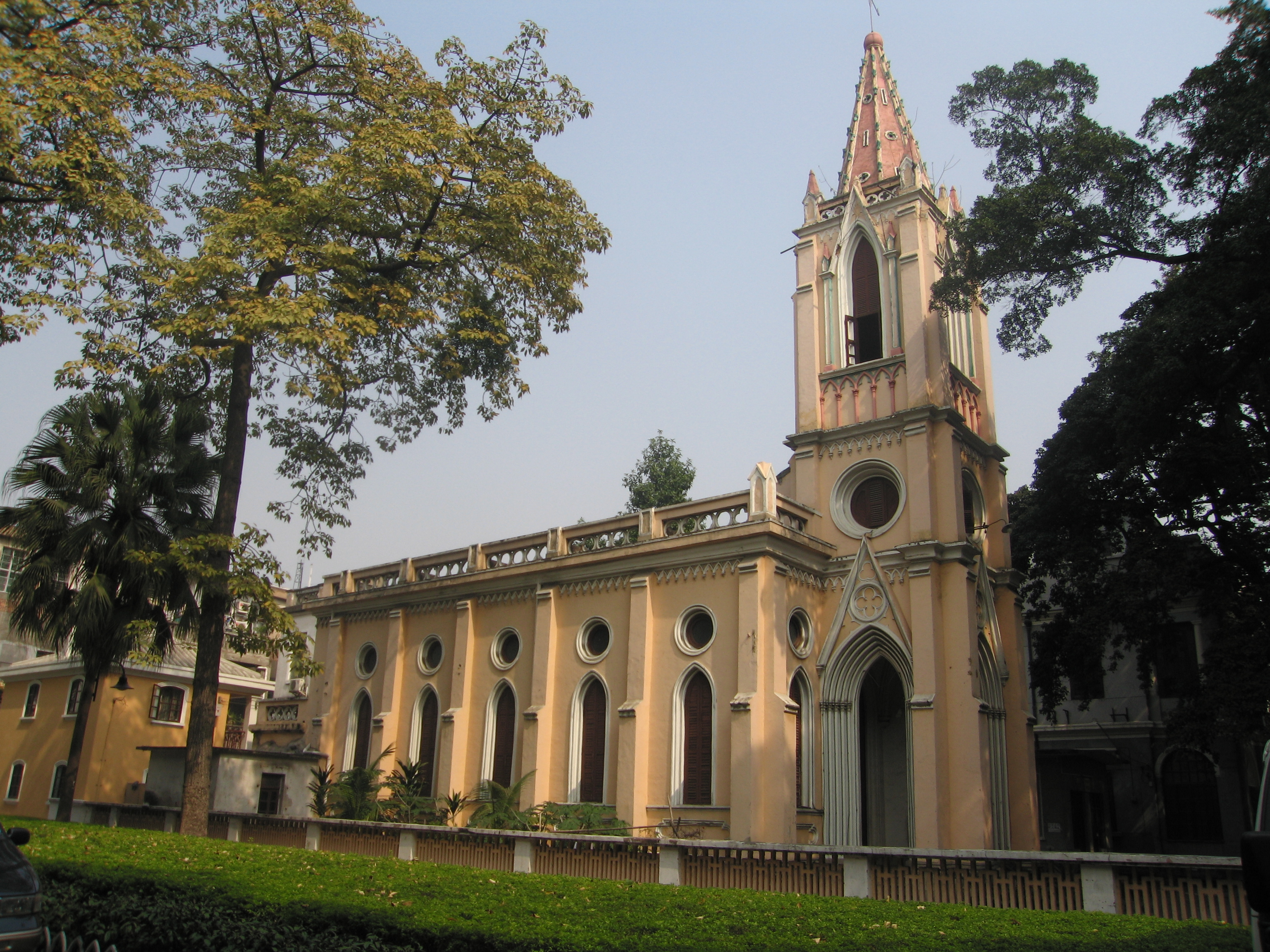
- Our Lady of Lourdes Chapel, Shamian Island

- Location in Guangdong Our Lady of Lourdes Chapel, Shamian Island (China)
- 23°06′35.80″N 113°14′32.55″E
- Location: Shamian, Liwan District of Guangzhou, Guangdong
- Country: China
- Denomination: Roman Catholic

History
- Status: Parish church
- Founded: 1889

Architecture
- Functional status: Active
- Architectural type: Church building
- Style: Gothic architecture
- Years built: 1890

Specifications
- Materials: Stone

Administration
- Diocese: Guangzhou

Clergy
- Bishop: Chen Zhijiang (陈志江)

The Our Lady of Lourdes Chapel, Shamian Island (simplified Chinese: 沙面露德圣母堂; traditional Chinese: 沙面露德聖母堂; pinyin: Shāmiàn Lùdé Shèngmǔtáng; Jyutping: Saa1min2 Lou6dak1 Sing3mou5tong4) is a 20th-century gothic church. It is located in Shamian, Liwan District of Guangzhou, Guangdong, China.

== History ==
The church was built in 1890 by the French government. During the ten-year Cultural Revolution, religious activities in the church were forced to cease. After the 3rd Plenary Session of the 11th Central Committee of the Chinese Communist Party, according to a policy of some religious freedom, it was officially reopened to the public on December 8, 1982. It was repaired and renovated before the 2010 Asian Games.

== See also ==
- Dongshan Church (Guangzhou)
