= Shamian Christian Church =

- 沙面基督堂 基督教沙面堂
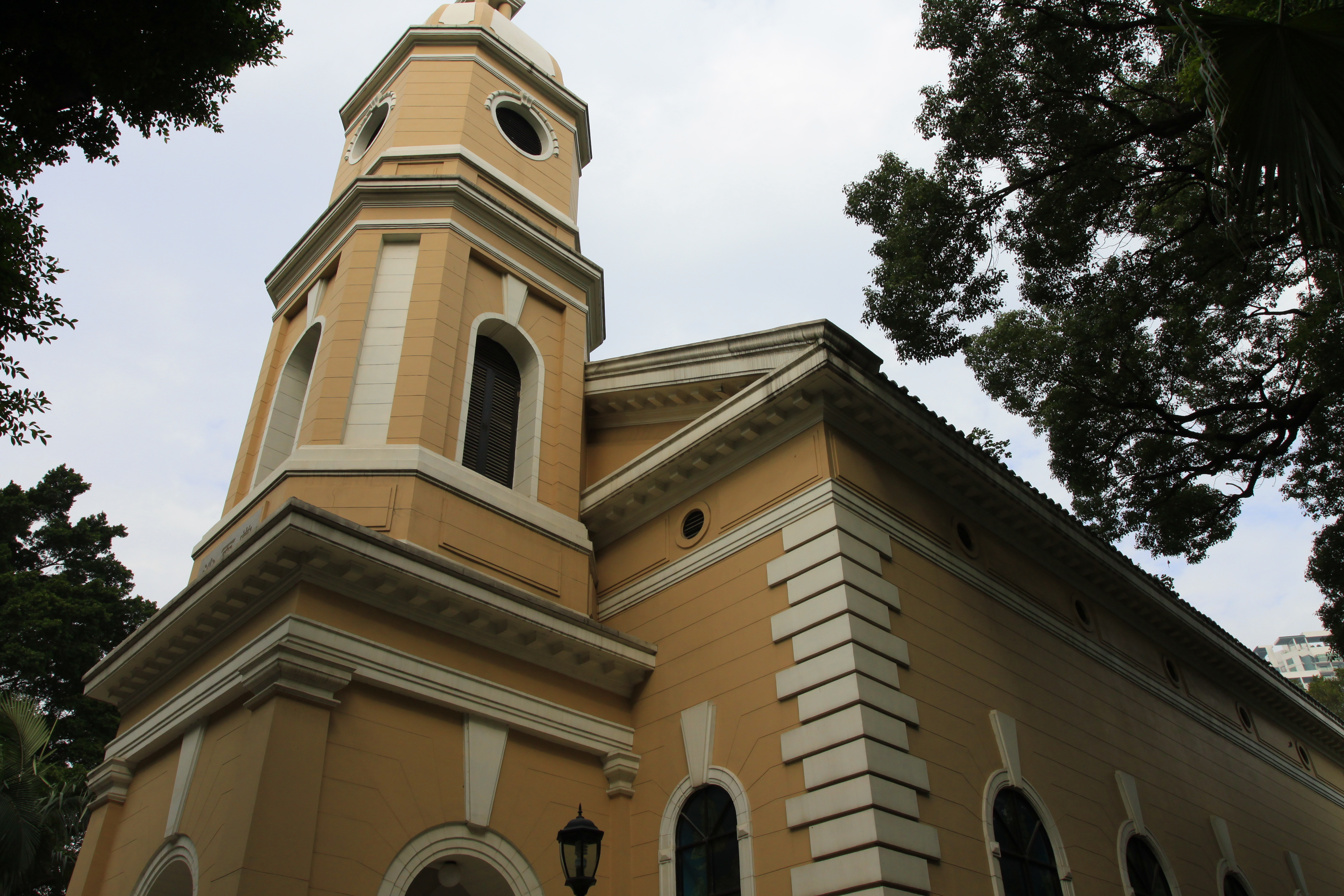
- Shamian Christian Church

- Location in Guangdong. Shamian Christian Church (China)
- 23.112784°N 113.248055°E
- Location: Shamian, Liwan District of Guangzhou, Guangdong
- Country: China
- Denomination: Protestantism

History
- Status: Parish church
- Founded: 1865

Architecture
- Functional status: Active
- Architectural type: Church building
- Style: Victorian style
- Years built: 1865
- Groundbreaking: 1865
- Completed: 1865

Specifications
- Materials: Bricks

Clergy
- Bishop: Lin Enling (林恩灵)

Shamian Christian Church (Chinese: 沙面基督教堂; pinyin: Shmian Jīdūjiàotáng) is a Protestant church located in Shamian, Liwan District of Guangzhou, Guangdong, China.

== History ==
Shamian Christian Church was built by the Church of England in 1865 for British expatriates. It was located in the Shamian Guangzhou British Concession. After World War II, the Nationalist Government retracted the concession and handed the church over to the South China Diocese of the Chung Hua Sheng Kung Hui, or Anglican Church in China.

Following the Chinese Communist Revolution, the local government took custody of the Shamian Christian Church. After the 3rd plenary session of the 11th Central Committee of the Chinese Communist Party in 1978, a policy of some religious freedom was implemented. In 1980, the Guangdong Committee of the Three-Self Patriotic Movement of the Protestant Church and Guangdong Christian Council took over its administration. Services resumed in 1991.

== Parish ==
The church has one Sunday Service (主日崇拜) at 9:30am on Sunday morning. The Weekday Meeting (祷告聚会) is at 7:30pm on Saturday.

== See also ==
- Dongshan Church (Guangzhou)
