= Cantonese culture =

Culture of Southern China

- Traditional Chinese: 粵文化
- Simplified Chinese: 粤文化
Transcriptions
Standard Mandarin
- Hanyu Pinyin: Yuè wénhuà
Yue: Cantonese
- Yale Romanization: Yuht màhnfaa
- Jyutping: Jyut6 man4faa3

Lingnan culture
- Traditional Chinese: 嶺南文化
- Simplified Chinese: 岭南文化
Transcriptions
Standard Mandarin
- Hanyu Pinyin: Lǐngnán wénhuà
Yue: Cantonese
- Yale Romanization: Líhngnàahm màhnfa
- Jyutping: Ling5naam4 man4faa3

Gwongfu culture
- Traditional Chinese: 廣府文化
- Simplified Chinese: 广府文化
Transcriptions
Standard Mandarin
- Hanyu Pinyin: Guǎngfǔ Wénhuà
Yue: Cantonese
- Yale Romanization: Gwóngfú màhnfaa
- Jyutping: Gwong2fu2 man4faa3

Cantonese culture, or Lingnan culture, refers to the regional Chinese culture of the region of Lingnan: twin provinces of Guangdong and Guangxi, the names of which mean "eastern expanse" and "western expanse", respectively, and Hong Kong and Macau.

With the migration of the Cantonese people to nearby Hong Kong and Macau, as well as in many overseas communities, Lingnan/Cantonese culture has become an influential cultural force in the international community, and forms the basis of the cultures of Hong Kong and Macau. English words of Chinese origin borrowed many terms from Cantonese.

== Terminology ==
Strictly speaking, the term "Lingnan culture" has two definitions:

1. In a purely geographical sense, the term includes not only Cantonese culture but also the cultures of the Hakkas, Teochews, Taishanese, Hainanese, and non-Han groups such as the Zhuangs, Tanka, or She within the Lingnan region.
2. More typically, is only used in referring to Cantonese culture, the historically dominant culturo-linguistic force in Guangdong and Guangxi.

This article uses the second definition of "Lingnan culture" – as the synonym of "Cantonese culture".

== Brief history and overview ==
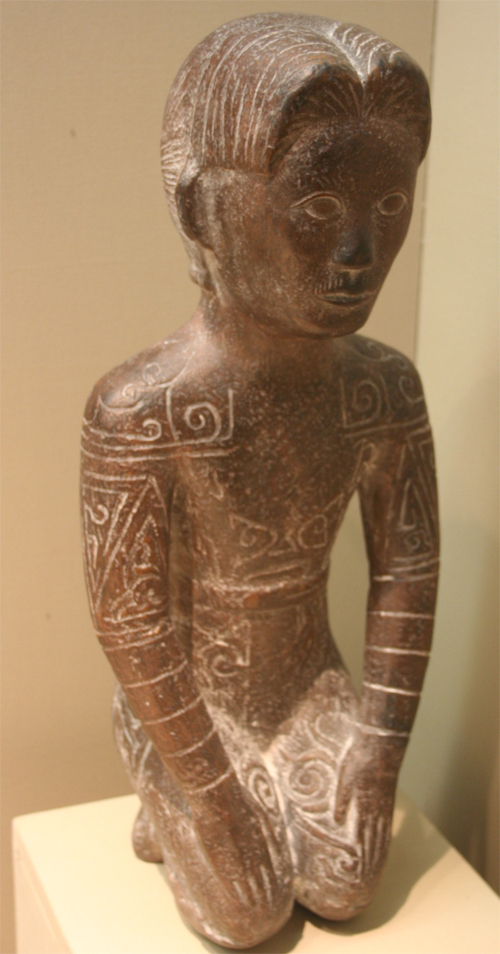
A statue from the ancient kingdom of Yue, before 200 BCE; At that time, the Lingnan region was the territory of the Baiyue peoples, who were later sinicized.

=== From Nanyue to Sinicization ===
In 200 BCE, Guangdong and Guangxi, alongside the land now known as Northern Vietnam, was controlled by the kingdom of Nanyue (南越國; naam4 jyut6 gwok3), inhabited primarily by the non-Chinese Yue people. The kingdom was later conquered by the Han Empire and came under Han Chinese control at around year 100 BCE. However, large-scale sinicization did not occur until the 6th to 7th century CE, at which point the region was held by the Tang Empire. Later, between the 10th and 13th century, there was a large influx of Han Chinese migrants from the north, which was at that time invaded by the Mongols and a few other non-Han ethnic groups. This resulted in large-scale intermixing of the Han Chinese and Nanyue people during that period –reflected in the fact that modern Cantonese people are, genetically, hybrid descendants of the ancient Han Chinese and Nanyue cultures. Modern Lingnan (descendents of Northern Nanyue) contains both Nanyue and Han Chinese elements: modern Cantonese has kept some features of Middle Chinese pronunciation (the prestige language of the Tang Empire), but has also retained a substantial amount of features from the long-extinct Nanyue language.

Sinicization was still ongoing during the Tang and Northern Song dynasties, evidenced by many famous Northern Chinese poets and writers describing the region as "barbaric" and the language spoken in the region as unintelligible with the prestige language commonly spoken in the North. Famous Chinese writer Han Yu described the local population as "小吏十餘家,皆鳥言夷面", which literally means "[speaking] a bird language and [having] barbarian faces". Another writer, Liu Zong Yuan, described the local language as "楚越間聲音特異，鴃舌啅譟", which literally means that the language sounds strange and is unintelligible with the common language from the North. From the 15th to 18th century, Lingnan (especially the area around Guangzhou) served as one of the main ports for the Ming Empire. Cantonese people were exposed to Western European cultures and incorporated European elements into their own cultural artifacts. It was by that time that the Lingnan culture largely attained its current form.

=== From 19th century onward ===
With Guangzhou being a major port for both the Qing dynasty and the People's Republic of China, Cantonese people have often dominated Han Chinese immigration to the Western world, resulting in Cantonese historically being the lingua franca in most Western Chinatowns. They also helped establish the Chinese term for Chinatown: 唐人街; tong4 jan4 gaai1. This term literally means "Street of the Tang people". This is said to reflect the fact that the sinicization of Lingnan was most prominent during the Tang dynasty, which resulted in the Cantonese people having an especially strong affinity to that dynasty.

Popular TV dramas and movies produced by Hong Kong resulted in the city having significant cultural influence in the region. Hong Kong, for its part, has experienced many cultural and economic exchanges with other East Asian nations. This, in turn, made Hong Kong absorb the cultures of Japan, Korea, and to some extent, Taiwan.

=== Overall characteristics ===
Lingnan culture is considered to be a commercial, oceanic culture that embodies the history of the region: Its foundation consists of a mix of Han Chinese and Nanyue (especially the Tang dynasty's and Song dynasty's) influences, having preserved a considerable amount of Tang-Song cultural heritages not preserved in other branches of modern Han Chinese cultures. Lingnan later became the Ming Empire's main contact point with Western Europeans via commerce, and thus came to include European ideas in its arts and philosophy.

== Traditional language ==
Traditionally, the Lingnan region's sole dominant language is Cantonese, the standard form and prestige dialect of the Yue Chinese. The vast majority of Lingnan's traditional operas, folk songs, and poetry are all expressed in Cantonese. It can trace its roots all the way back to the ancient Nanyue people. Their language did not belong to the Chinese language family, though. However, with the large influx of Han Chinese migrants throughout history, especially during the Tang–Song era between the 10th to 13th centuries, the language slowly sinicized and evolved into modern standard Cantonese.

Cantonese has retained certain features of the Nanyue language. For instance, unlike most other Chinese languages, Cantonese often put an adjective behind the noun it is describing. In Cantonese, the word for "hen" (雞乸; gai1 naa2) is made up of two words: "雞", meaning "chicken", and "乸", meaning "female (in a non-human sense)", thus resulting in a compound word.

Cantonese has largely inherited all six syllable codas (韵尾) from Middle Chinese, which means that most Tang poems will rhyme better if recited in Cantonese. However, Cantonese lost all voiced consonants (浊声母) from middle Chinese and its prenuclear glides (介音) have evolved significantly from middle Chinese.

=== Writing system ===
In terms of its writing system, Cantonese traditionally preferred not to write their own language verbatim and instead relied on classical Chinese in most forms of writing. Starting from the early 20th century, however, a complete Cantonese writing system had been developed in Hong Kong and Macau that utilizes both standard Chinese characters and native characters, and became popularized.

== Architecture ==
=== Classic Lingnan architecture ===
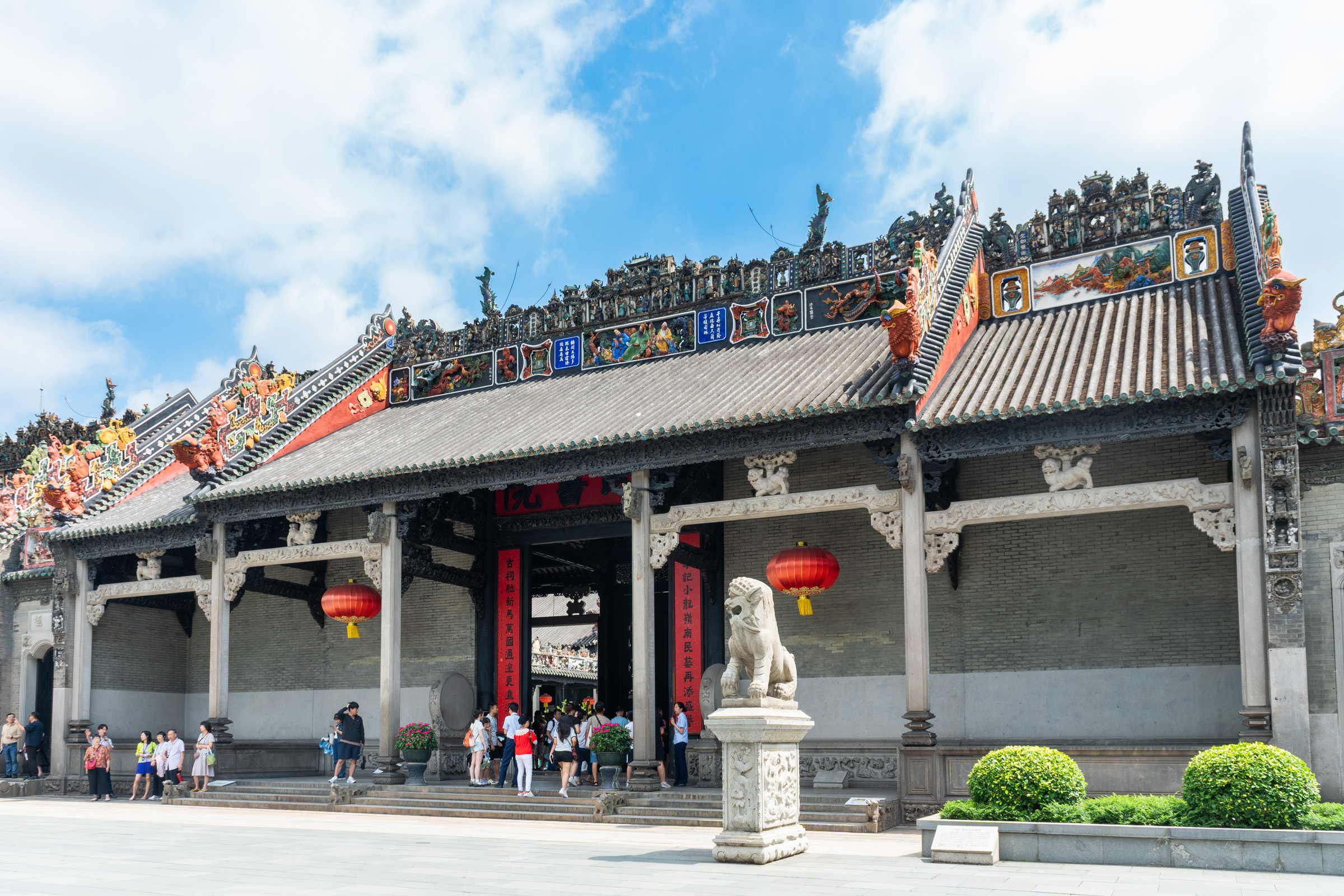
The Chan Clan Temple, an example of classical Lingnan architecture

Lingnan architecture (嶺南建築; ling5 naam4 gin3 zuk1) is the characteristic architectural style of the Lingnan region, mostly associated with Cantonese people. It differs significantly from those found in other Han Chinese regions because of factors such as climates and availability of materials, both of which were affected by the geographical features of Lingnan. Overall, classical Lingnan architecture tends to (1) use pale colors such as green and white, (2) avoid circular or cylindrical structures, (3) have many open structures like balconies, (4) be decorated with large numbers of relief carvings and sculptures, and (5) be built using materials resistant to moulds and moisture. The last point is related to the hot and humid subtropical climate of Lingnan.

The Chan Clan Temple in Guangzhou is a representative example of classical Lingnan architecture. The temple was built in the late 19th century and served as an academy for Chan families in 72 counties of the Guangdong province. It comprises all sorts of folk architectural and decorative arts and is famous for its "three carvings" (stone, wood, and brick carvings), "three sculptures" (ceramic sculpture, clay sculpture, and colorful sculpture), and "one cast" (cast iron). As a result, it is called the best of all the clan buildings in the neighborhood.

=== Tong lau ===
Tong lau (Chinese: 唐樓) is a style of architecture prevalent in the Lingnan region (as well as in some other areas by the South China Sea) starting from the 19th century. Combining Southern Chinese architectural styles with Western European ones, it is particularly prevalent in regions with more exposure to Western European cultures, such as Guangzhou, Hong Kong, and Macau. Tong laus in Lingnan show influence from the classical Lingnan style.

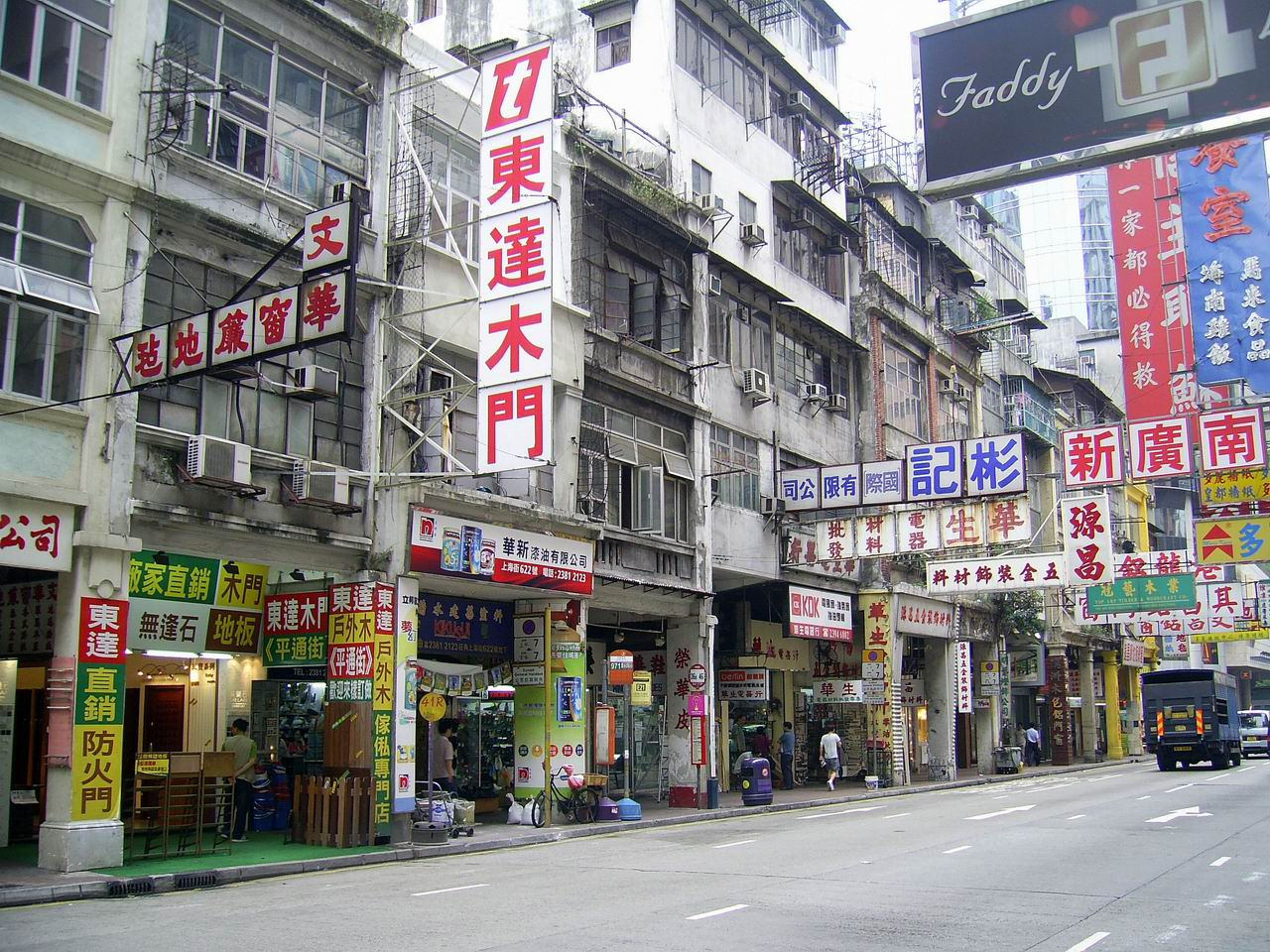
Tong laus are everywhere in Hong Kong.

=== Lingnan garden ===
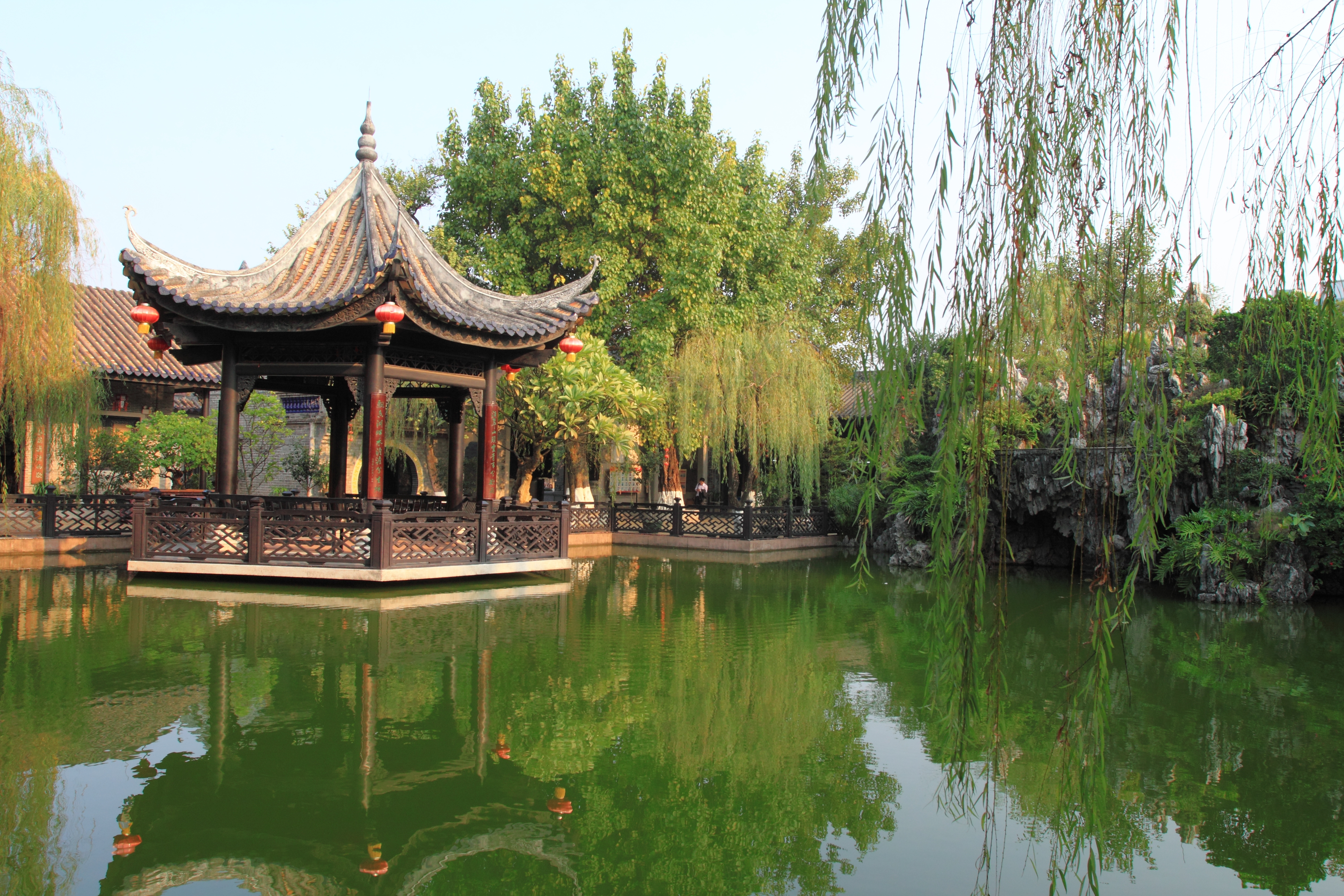
The pond of Yuyum Sanfong

Lingnan garden, or Cantonese garden, is the style of garden design native to the Lingnan region. Geographically, Lingnan has a very different climate from China's heartland (i.e., Zhongyuan), resulting in the development of a different style in garden-designing. The most frequently cited traits of Lingnan gardens are: (1) they tend to surround their plants and flowers with buildings for provided protection, due to the frequent rainstorms in the region; (2) Lingnan gardens usually use regionally native plant species, such as red cotton flowers, lotuses, orchids, and lychee trees; and (3) due to Lingnan being far away from the center of political power (i.e., Zhongyuan), gardens in the region have historically been less stressed by royal standards, resulting in a style that leans more towards the common people, e.g., Lingnan gardens are decorated with a large amount of folk arts, ranging from sculptures to porcelains, and also tend to use smaller and simpler buildings.

== Visual arts ==
The Nanyue people were already making a lot of pottery and sculptures back at the time of their kingdom. After sinicization, the techniques of the people in the region only became even more polished and refined. Nowadays, Cantonese are accomplished craftspeople, known for creating and exporting many fine craft products, including various types of sculptures, embroidery, porcelain, paper cutting, kites, and furniture, among many others. They have also produced several schools of fine arts. In some, visual art styles invented primarily by the Cantonese include the following:

=== Canton ivory carving ===
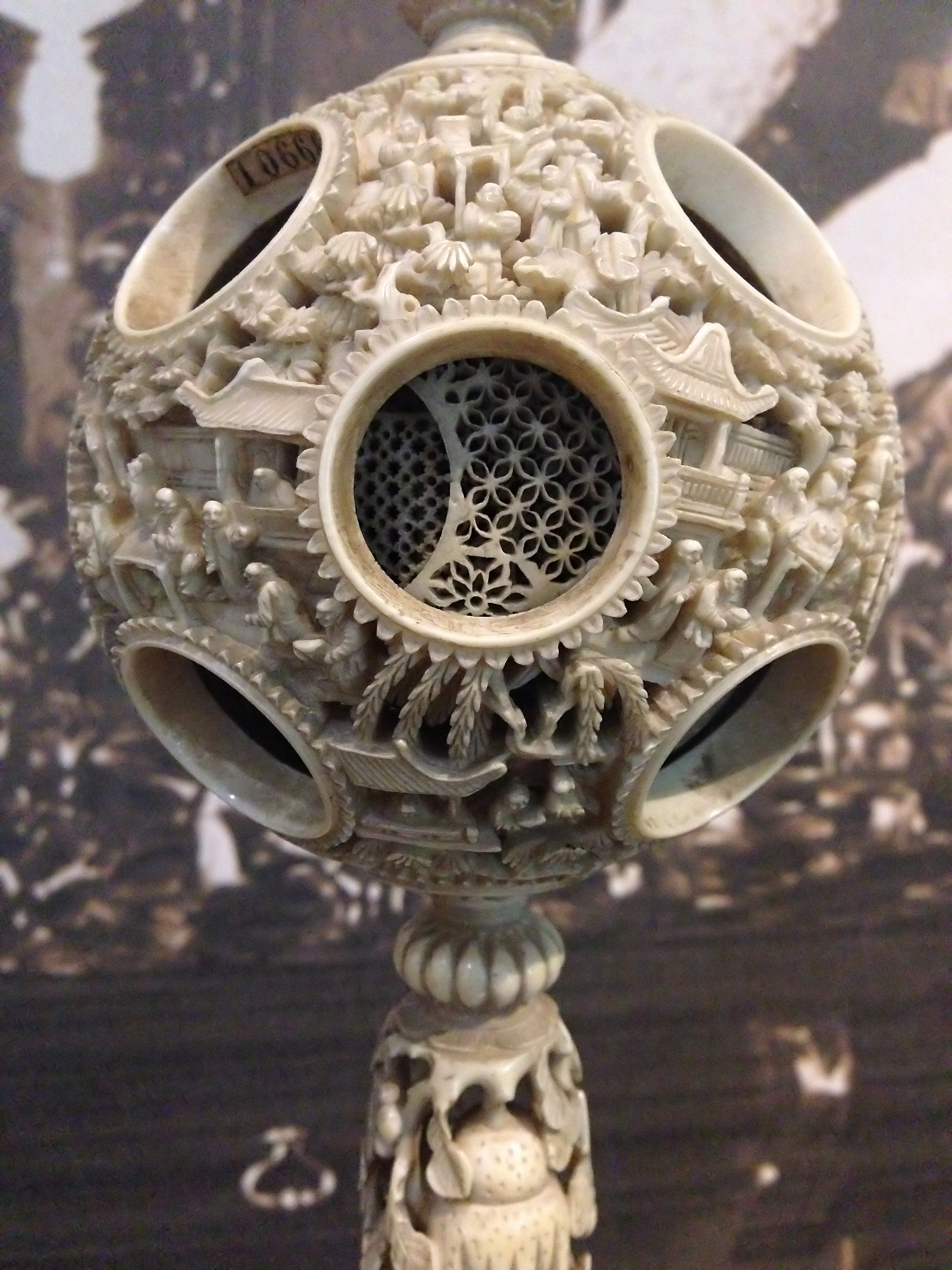
An ivory ball on display at the German Rautenstrauch-Joest Museum. It has 16 layers, which can spin.

Canton ivory woodcarving (廣州牙雕; gwong2 zau1 ngaa4 diu1) is another well-known product from Lingnan. With a history of 2000 years, it traditionally uses ivory as a raw material to make sculptures, with the Canton-style renowned for being particularly delicate and detailed without being brittle. The Cantonese people have also successfully produced the legendary craft product – Ivory ball.

After the 1980s, however, international ivory trade has been banned. This resulted in the Cantonese people now trying to find substitute materials – materials that look and feel like but are actually not ivory – in their attempt to pass on this ancient art.

=== Canton jade carving ===
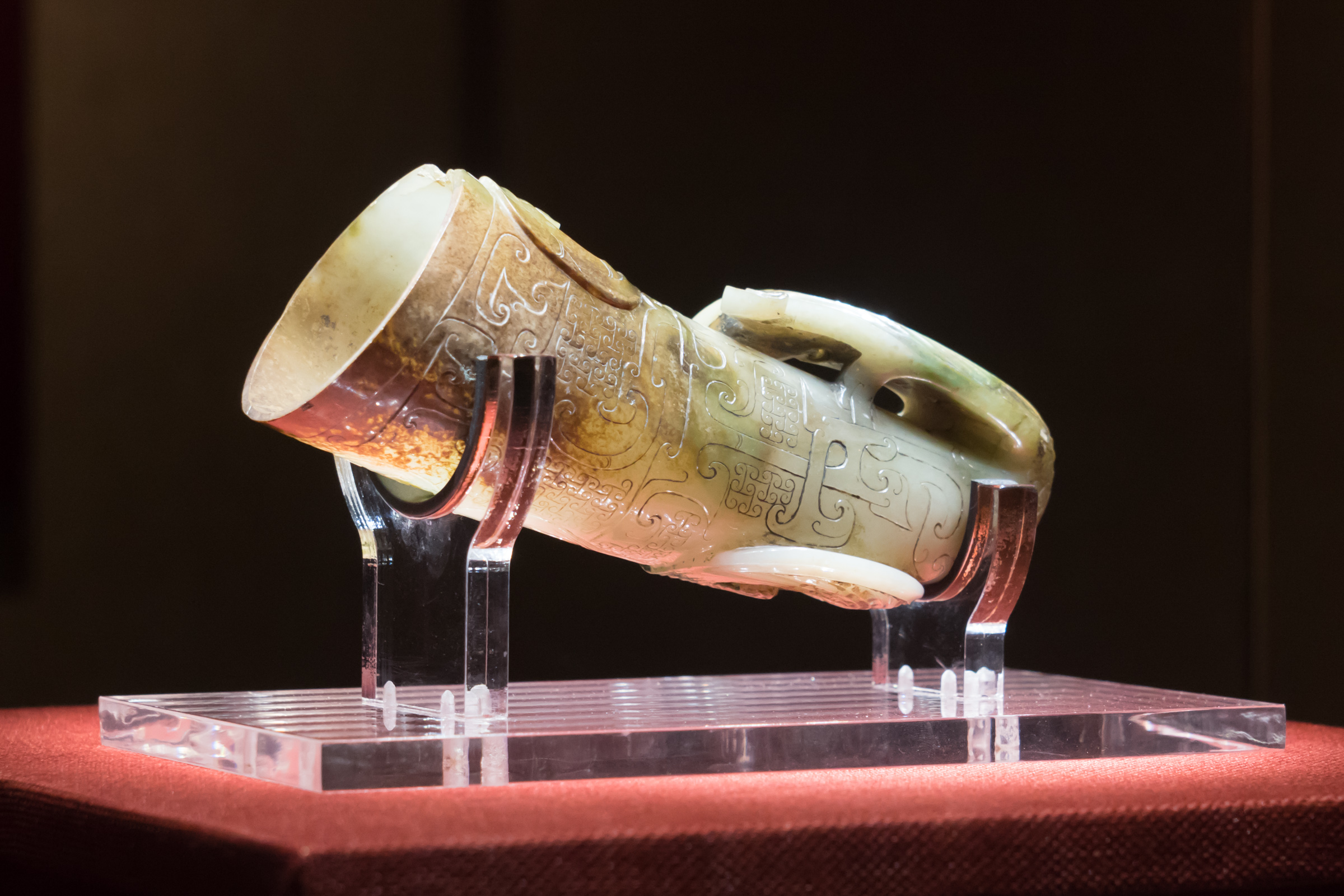
Jadeware unearthed from the tomb of the king of Nanyue

Canton jade carving (廣州玉雕; gwong2 zau1 juk6 diu1) is the Cantonese style of jade carving. It has a history of more than two thousand years – with archaeologists unearthing jade carvings from the remains of the kingdom of Nanyue. After sinicization, the people of Lingnan learned jade carving from the Tang Empire's jade wares, and invented the technique of "lau sik" (留色; lau4 sik1, lit. 'retaining the colors') – retaining the colors of the original materials, resulting in jade carvings that are very colourful yet natural. Nowadays, Canton jade carvings are frequently used in Cantonese jewelry and decorations.

=== Cantonese embroidery ===
Cantonese embroidery is the Cantonese style of embroidery, with considerable popularity in Lingnan and its own subculture. It could trace its root to at least the 9th century, where the Tang Empire had documented that the people in the area were making embroidery. Cantonese embroidery attained its current form around the 15th century and has its own set of techniques. Visually, it is known for being colorful and containing multiple images without feeling chaotic. Due to Guangdong's historical role in trade between the Chinese empire and the outside world, Cantonese embroidery had been sold to many Western European people and became a popular type of item in European aristocrats' collections of oriental crafts.

=== Teochew woodcarving ===
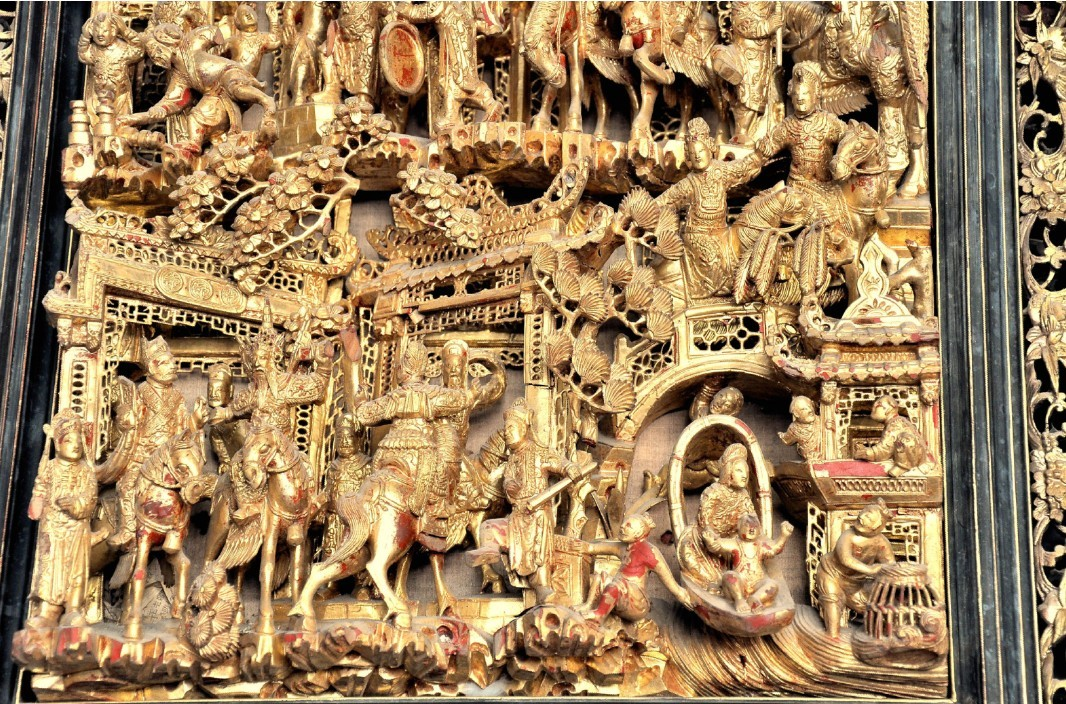
Teochew woodcarving products are frequently painted gold.

Teochew woodcarving is a distinctive style of woodcarving that originated from the city of Teochew, which is geographically a part of Lingnan but inhabited primarily by the Teochew people, who belong to the non-Cantonese Min branch of Han Chinese. Despite this, this style of woodcarving is heavily incorporated into various forms of Cantonese crafts. It began in the 11th century and became popularized in the late 16th century. Many Teochew woodcarving products are plated with gold, commonly seen being decorations for Buddhist temples or ancestral halls.

=== Lingnan penjing ===
Lingnan penjing (嶺南盆景; ling5 naam4 pun4 ging2) is the style of penjing of the people of Lingnan. Despite being recognized only in the early 20th century, it can trace its roots to at least the 15th century. This style is noted for its emphasis on the match between "the natural" and "the artificial" parts of the penjing. For instance, artists of Lingnan penjing tend to spend much time choosing a pot that matches those plants. They also tend to trim their plants in such a way that the new growth from the trimmed parts will shadow the trails of trimming, resulting in the penjing looking very natural.

=== Lingnan style of calligraphy ===
Lingnan style of calligraphy is typically described by Han Chinese critics as "bold" and "romantic". Archaeological evidence suggests that the people of Lingnan had been writing and producing calligraphy works since the collapse of the kingdom of Nanyue. However, due to the hot and humid climate of Lingnan, papers tend to decay very quickly, resulting in few such works having been preserved. It was not until the 15th century, when Chan Bak-sa became the first renowned Cantonese calligrapher, that the Lingnan region got a recognized style of calligraphy. Since then, Cantonese artists have produced several notable works of calligraphy, such as:

Picture Poem of Farewell to Yun Sung-wun (袁崇煥督遼餞別圖詩) by Kwong Lou, a Cantonese calligrapher from the early 16th century; This work was made in his farewell to his good friend Yun Sung-wun, who had to leave Lingnan due to an assignment from the then Ming emperor. It is a work of "poem painting" (painting with a poem written on it; with both the picture and the poem having some sort of relation to each other). This work is now stored in Hong Kong.
Picture of Various Southern Gentlemen Coming to Say Farewell (南園諸子送黎美周北上詩卷) by Zeung Kiu, a Cantonese young woman from the early 16th century, well-known for being both beautiful and very talented. Despite this, she died of an illness at the young age of 19 and her death was widely mourned as a great loss. This work of poem painting is one of her few works and now on display at the Guangzhou Museum of Art.

In the 21st century, the Cantonese people have begun to study the Lingnan style of calligraphy in greater depth.

Calligraphy of Gou Gim-fu
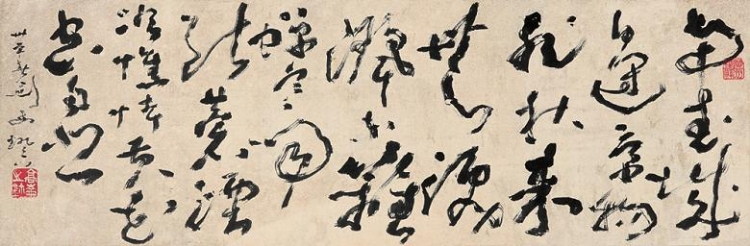

=== Canton porcelain ===
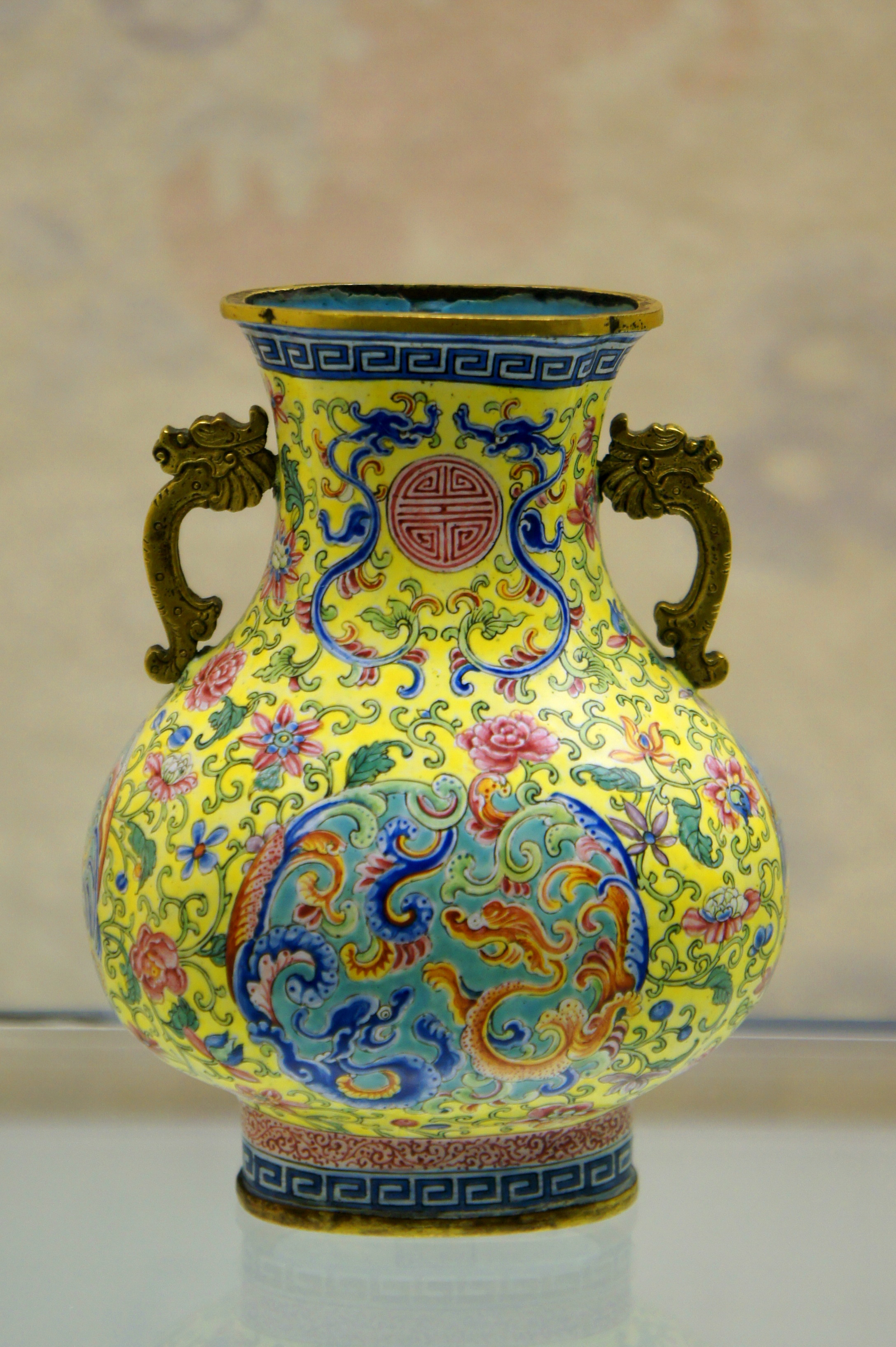
"Vase with floral scroll design", on display at the Hong Kong Museum of Art, is typically cited as a representative example of Canton porcelain.

Canton porcelain involves painting various colors on white porcelains and cementing the colors on the porcelain products afterward through the use of low heat (less than 800 °C, which is low by porcelain standards). This style is renowned for its bright colors and detailed drawings. It originated in the 16th century. At that time, the Cantonese people in Guangzhou imported white porcelains from Jingdezhen (a city well known for making white porcelains), worked on them to produce colorful porcelains, and exported their products to Western Europe. Later, this art spread to the entire Lingnan region. Hong Kong, for instance, started making Canton porcelain starting from the 1930s and exported many of their products to the entire world, though nowadays, few Hongkongers work on this style of porcelain outside hobbyists, due to the fact that the city has shifted its focus to the service and finance industries.

Gallery

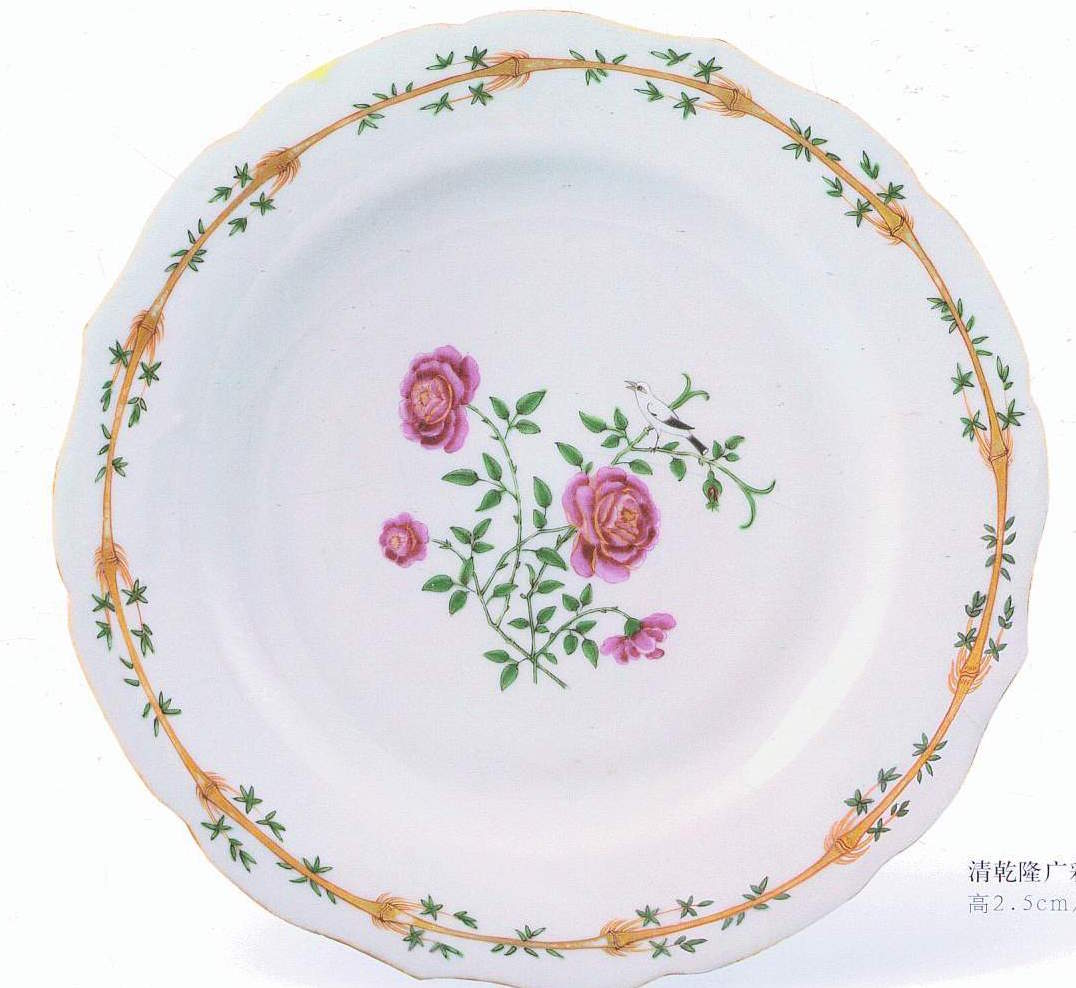

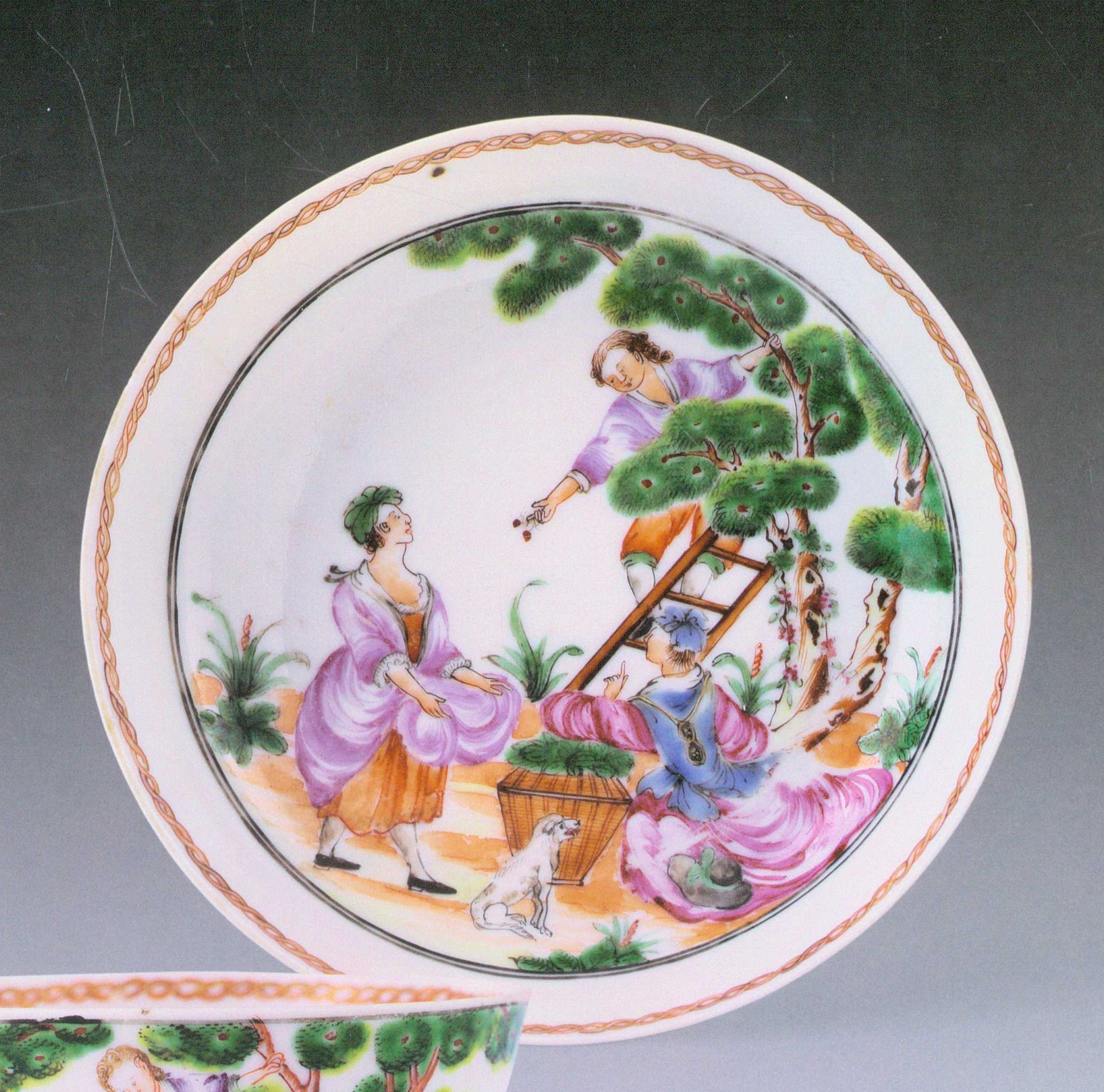

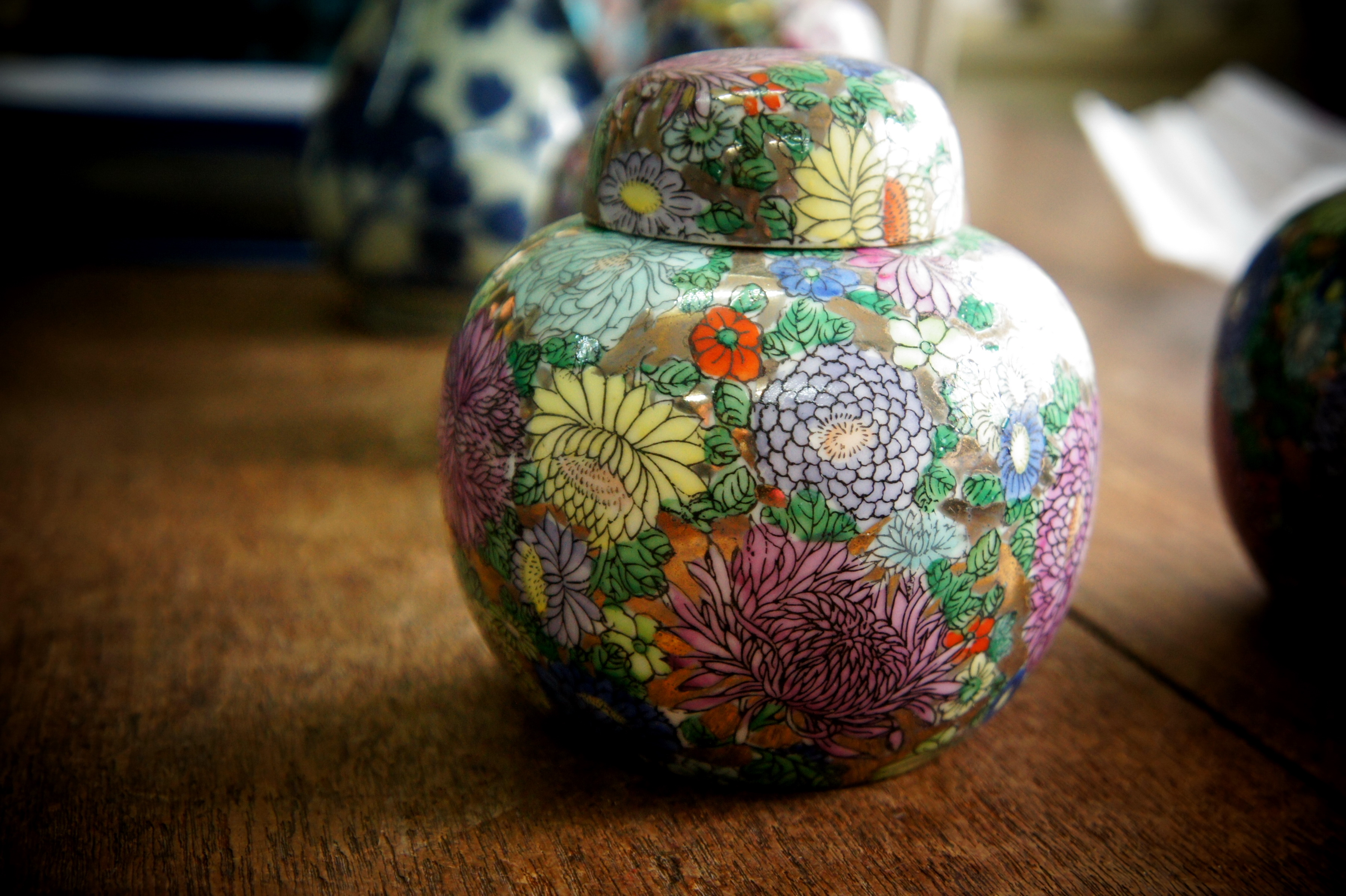

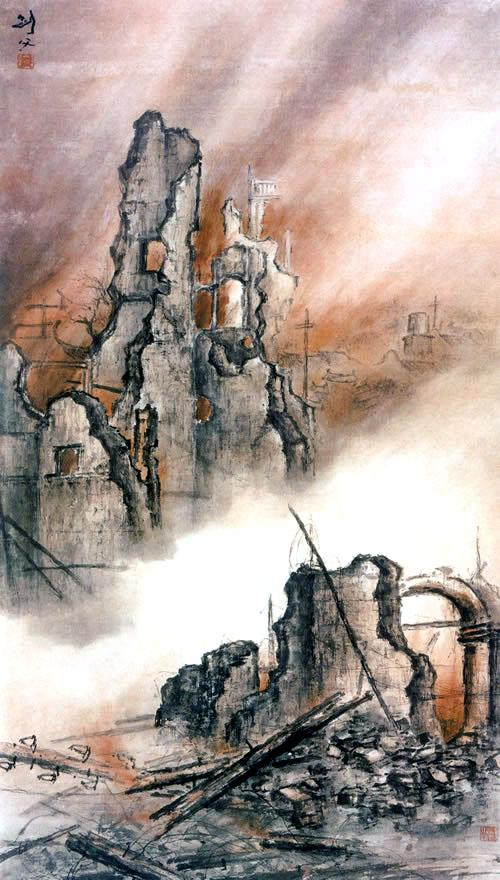
"The Flames of the Eastern Battlefield" (Traditional Chinese: 東戰場的烈焰) from the 1930s. It is the work of Gou Gim-Fu, one of the founders of the Lingnan school of painting and regularly cited as one of the representative early works of this school.

=== Cantonese furniture ===
Cantonese furniture can be dated at least back to the 17th century. This style generally uses the native timbers in the Lingnan region, while borrowing elements from traditional furniture styles of the Tang Empire and the Song Empire and artistic styles imported from Western Europe. It is characterized by (1) its tendency to make each furniture item by working on one larger piece of wood, resulting in Cantonese furniture not showing traces of being assembled; (2) taking elements from Baroque and Rococo style, especially in its use of curves; (3) using techniques from other Lingnan crafts, such as Teochew woodcarving; and (4) heavy use of shells and marbles as decorations. Nowadays, Cantonese furniture is being exported to many other Han Chinese communities and to foreign countries.

=== Lingnan school of painting ===
The Lingnan School is a distinctive style of painting invented primarily by Cantonese artists. It originated in the 19th century, founded by Gou Gim-fu and several of his associates. This style combined the ink wash painting shared by all Han Chinese and watercolor painting, also with the influence from impressionism. It emphasizes leaving blank spaces and the use of bright colors, in stark contrast to less colorful ink wash painting. For example, "The Flames of the Eastern Battlefield" used watercolor to paint bright red colors in the background. This, alongside the blank spaces in the painting, gives potential alternative interpretations of the blank spaces, which could look like either smoke or clouds.

=== Others ===
Sekwan ware and Cochin ware are types of pottery with Cantonese origins. The former is still being produced by Cantonese, while the latter is more associated with Taiwan these days. Xiangyunsha silk has origins in Cantonese culture as well, in Guangdong province.

== Performing arts ==
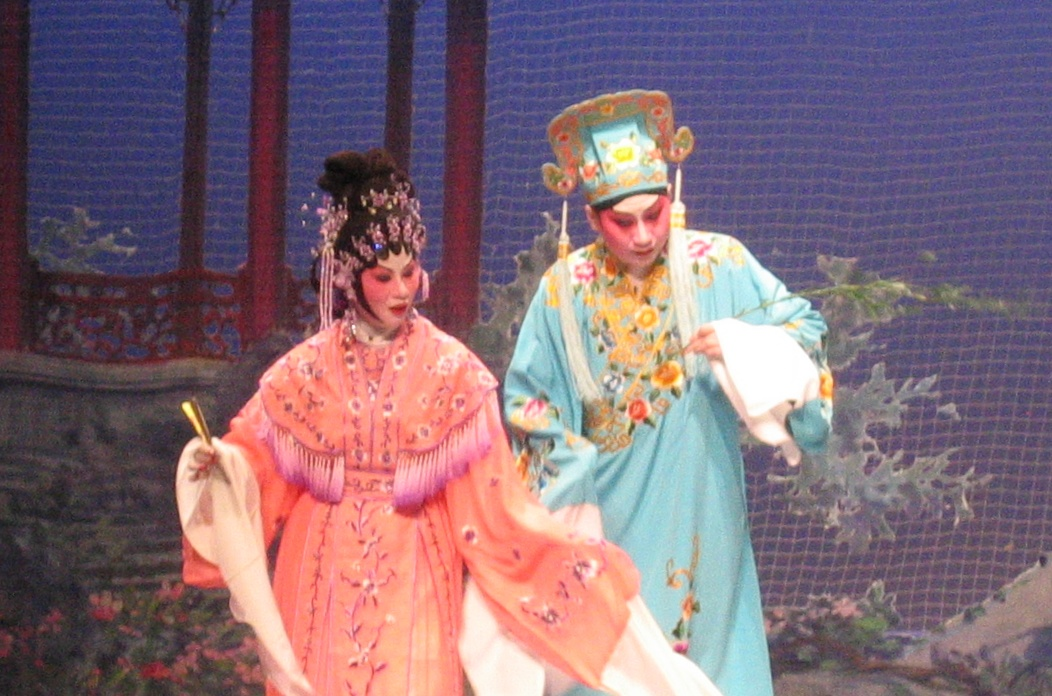
A Cantonese opera performance in Vancouver. Most of the Chinese communities there are of Cantonese ancestry, hence the presence of their style of opera.

Cantonese people are involved in several types of operas and performing arts, including Tea-picking opera and Han opera, with Cantonese opera being the most prominent one. They also have many types of traditional music. All of these are primarily sung and expressed using the Cantonese language.

=== Folk songs ===
The Cantonese language has a very rich collection of folk songs, many of which can be traced back to the ancient Nanyue people before sinicization of the region. These folk songs are widely sung and broadcast in the Lingnan region even to this day. Broadly speaking, they can be divided into several categories:

"Saltwater songs" (Jyutping: Haam4 seoi2 go1; Traditional Chinese: 鹹水歌), which are popular around the Pearl River Delta, like this one;
"Rooster-selling rhythms" (Jyutping: Maai6 gai1 diu6; Traditional Chinese: 賣雞調), which are traditionally sung in rooster-worshiping rituals and said to be related to the bird-worshiping totems of Baiyue peoples; An example would be this;
"Kerria songs" (Jyutping: Gou1 tong4 go1; Traditional Chinese: 高棠歌), which are often sung in weddings;
"North Canton folk songs" (Jyutping: Jyut6 bak1 man4 go1; Traditional Chinese: 粵北民歌), popular in northern Guangdong;
"Cantonese rhymes" (Jyutping: Jyut6 diu1; Traditional Chinese: 粵調), which consist of various subtypes based on pitches and rhythms and include the nam yum tradition. An example of Cantonese rhythms is this.

=== Cantonese opera ===
Cantonese opera is the style of opera associated with the Cantonese language. Listed as an intangible cultural heritage of the world, it originated in the late 13th century and is a stage art that combines acrobatics, singing, martial arts, and acting.

Cantonese opera also uses a different set of musical instruments. Some of these are used also in other oriental opera styles, such as Guzheng. Due to influence from Western opera, Cantonese opera had also started adopting European instruments starting from the 19th century, such as violin. Cantonese opera is also noted for its use of makeup and headdresses on the actors' parts. Makeups in Cantonese opera are primarily white, and could vary in colors depending on the personalities of the characters, e.g., totally white makeups are often used to represent a villain. Headdresses are also used to represent the characters.

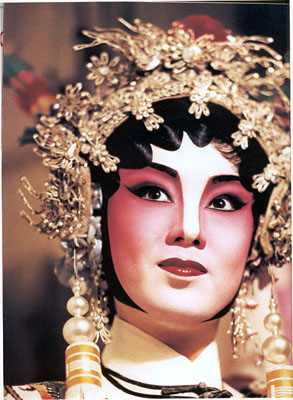
A female Cantonese opera singer

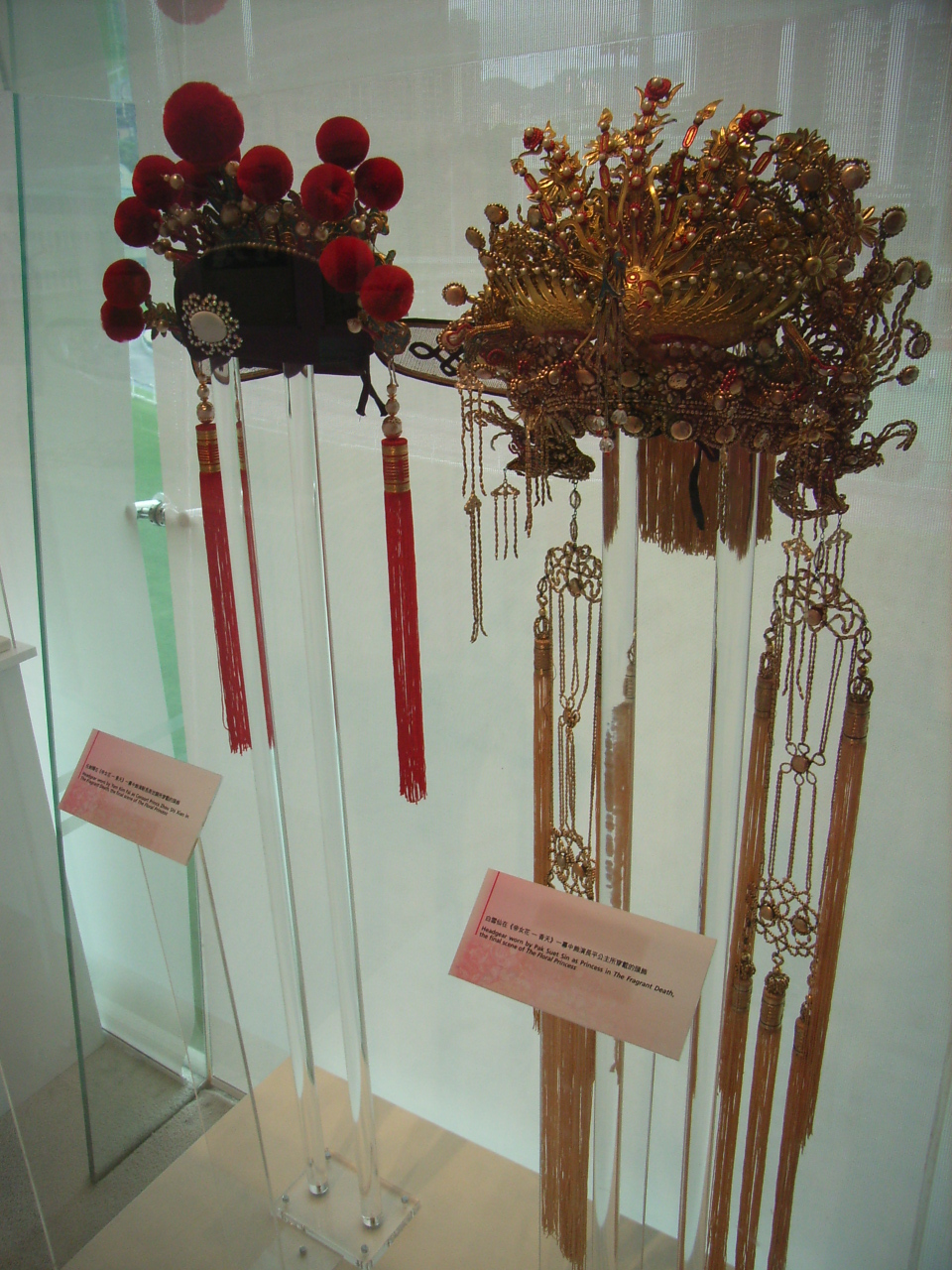
Headdresses used in Cantonese opera

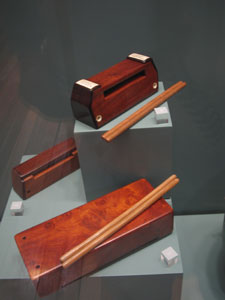
Bangzi, a musical instrument used in Cantonese opera

=== Gonggu ===
Gonggu (講古; gong2 gu2, literally "to talk about the past") is a popular folk art in Lingnan. It involves artists telling stories from Chinese classics or Cantonese folklore using the Cantonese language – while borrowing techniques from Cantonese opera in order to be very rhythmic at that. This art form originated in the 16th century, when Cantonese imported it from Jiangsu and several Cantonese artists learnt from the then famous Wuyue storytellers. Since that time, Cantonese Gonggu has seen steady development, with storytellers performing in their own stalls or Cantonese teahouses. Starting from the 20th century, the area around Guangzhou has even started erecting "storytelling stages" (說書台; syut3 syu1 toi4, lit. stages where one talks about books) in certain parks and inviting artists to do Gonggu on radio shows.

Partly as a result of this, Cantonese people have accumulated a considerable amount of folktales.

=== Guangdong music ===
Guangdong music is a style of traditional Chinese instrumental music from Guangzhou and nearby areas, though nowadays it is found also in much of China. Guangdong music compositions are primarily based on tunes derived from Cantonese opera and Cantonese folk songs, especially before the 1920s. Stylistically, it is said to be marked by being loud, lively, and upbeat. Some pieces have seen influences from Western music (jazz in particular): they use syncopation and triple time, and incorporate instruments such as the saxophone and violin.

==== Musical instruments ====
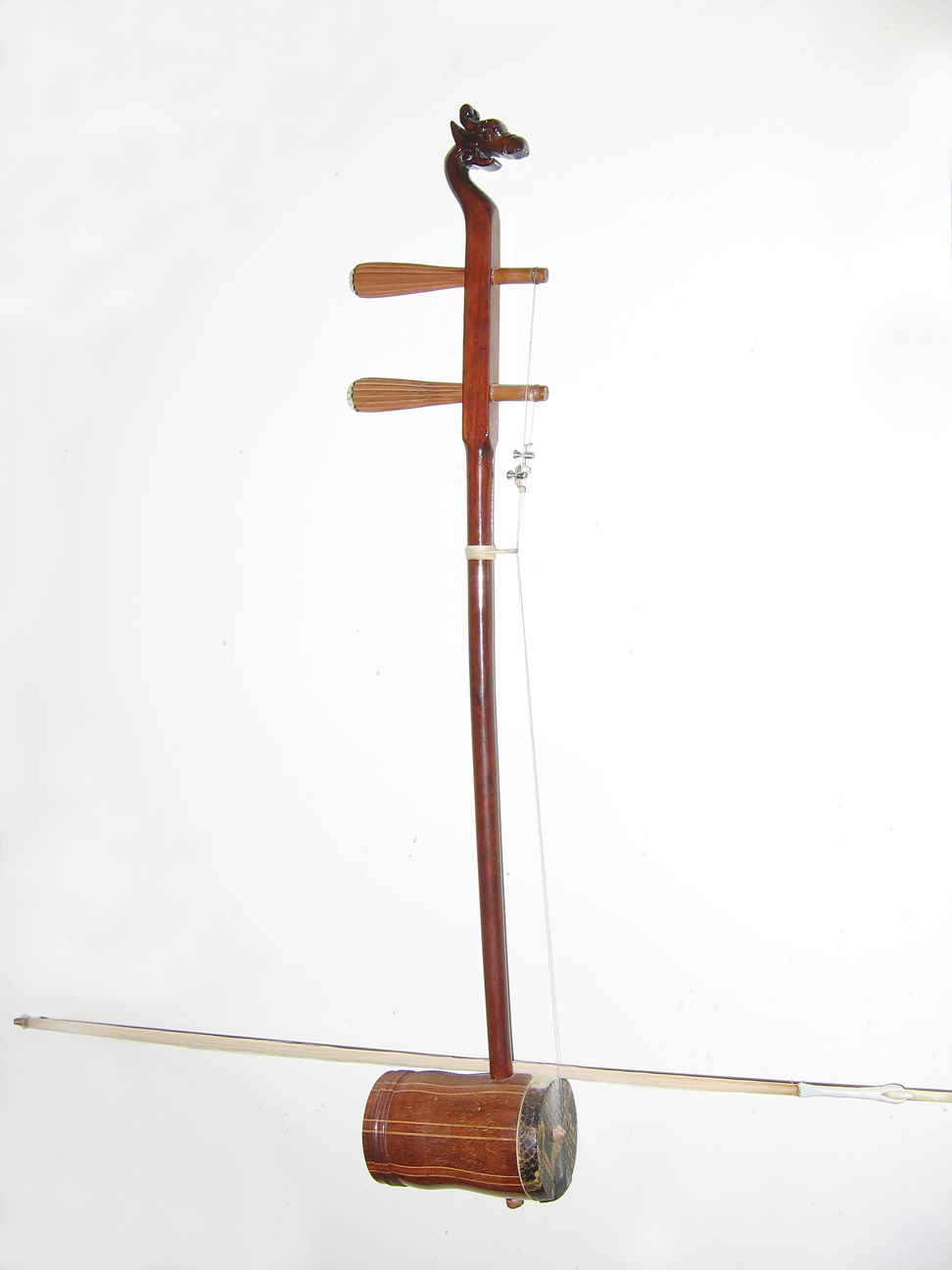
The Gou Wu is a Cantonese musical instrument, and is commonly used in Cantonese opera and music.

The set of musical instruments used in Cantonese opera styles and music has much overlapping with those used by other Han Chinese groups. There are, however, instruments distinctly Cantonese, with the gaohu (gou wu) being the most representative. Aside from this, qinqin (cheon kum) and erxian (yi yun) are other musical instruments associated with Cantonese music.

=== Pop ===
Canto-pop, also called HK-pop, is a genre of Cantonese music made primarily in Hong Kong. It is a pop subgenre, with influences from jazz, rock and roll, R&B, electronic music, dance music, and others. It is almost invariably sung in Cantonese, boasting an international fanbase across Guangzhou, Guangxi, Southeast Asia, and (to a lesser extent) Korea and Japan.

=== Cinema ===
For a long time, the Hong Kong cinema had been one of the largest movie industries in the world and still has influence to this day. Being produced by Hong Kong, these movies have been primarily expressed using Cantonese, although films from certain periods were in Mandarin due to geopolitical reasons. Their genres may vary, although comedy and martial arts movies are particularly prominent. This style of cinema has a cult following in the West.

== Literature ==
=== Poetry ===
The Cantonese language, with its 1000-year-long history, has a rich heritage of poetry and literature. The people of the Lingnan region have been composing poems since the 7th century. Zeung Gau-ling, one of the most prolific poets of the Tang Empire, was born and raised in what is now Siugwan, Guangdong. He was said to be very intelligent since he was a child, and later became the empire's minister. 12 of his poems were listed as the 300 best poems from the Tang Empire. Since then, the Lingnan region has produced a steady stream of poets of varying levels of prominence. They were even given a label called Lingnan school of poetry (嶺南詩派), renowned for preserving pronunciations from the Middle Chinese language and composing poems with imagery unique to Lingnan.

Like much of East Asia, most of Lingnan's medieval literature was composed in classical Chinese (grammatically), rather than the people's spoken language. However, poets in the region had started composing poems using grammatically vernacular Cantonese since the 19th century, with the work of Cantonese poet Liu Yan-tou being the most prominent. Many of his works require Cantonese characters (characters specifically invented to write Cantonese) to write down.

This particular style of poetry has accumulated a large number of works. Starting from the early 21st century, Cantonese people have started compiling works of past Cantonese poets in a literature called "All Cantonese Poems" (全粵詩; cyun4 jyut6 si1), which has spanned 30 volumes and is yet to be finished.

=== Vernacular Cantonese literature ===
Like the rest of East Asia, Lingnan traditionally used classical Chinese for writing, rather than the peoples' spoken languages. Despite the attempt to create vernacular forms of writing in the late 19th century, the Greater China area still tended to use standard written Chinese, a writing system based on Mandarin, not Cantonese (i.e., the native language of the Lingnan region), in writing. Even in cosmopolitan Hong Kong, the vast majority of the people's works of literature have been written in standard written Chinese. However, starting from the 21st century, Hong Kong, as a cultural center in the region, has developed a complete writing system for Cantonese. Some writers in the city now advocate composing literature in written Cantonese.

== Food culture ==
The Lingnan region has a special geographical environment different from those of other Han Chinese regions. With its subtropical temperature and high humidity, it has a tendency to have good harvests, whether in farming or fishing. As a result, cuisine in Lingnan could use many different food materials. The book "New Comments on Guangdong" (廣東新語), written by Wat Dai-gwan, said: 天下所有食貨，粵東幾盡有之，粵東所有之食貨，天下未必盡也。 ("Every ingredient that the world has, Guangdong has it; Every ingredient that Guangdong has, the rest of the world may not have it"). Today, the cuisine of the Lingnan region has fully developed into a distinct school of cuisine on its own.

=== Cantonese cuisine ===
Guangzhou, the cultural capital of the region, has long been a trading hub. This resulted in many imported ingredients being used in Cantonese cuisine. Besides pork, beef, and chicken, Cantonese cuisine uses nearly every edible meat, including offal, chicken feet, duck's tongue, snakes, and snails. However, lamb and goat are rare. There is also heavy use of seafood, due to proximity to the sea. This style of cuisine uses many cooking methods, with steaming and stir-frying being the most popular, largely due to relative convenience.

Traditionally, Cantonese cooks prefer their dishes to have well-balanced flavor and not be greasy. Spices are used in modest amounts, at best, to preserve the flavors of the primary ingredients, which, in turn, are expected to be at the peak of their freshness and quality. Cantonese cooking tends not to use fresh herbs, contrary to Sichuan, European, Thai, and Vietnamese cuisines, with garlic chives and coriander leaves being the notable exceptions. Lastly, due to the hot and humid weather of Lingnan and the traditional beliefs that soups can "remove hotness" (清熱氣; cing1 jit6 hei3), Cantonese cuisine tends to make liberal use of soups.

==== Lou fo tong ====
Lou fo tong is a cuisine among common people in Lingnan. It refers to a set of clear broth made by simmering meat and other ingredients over low heat for several hours. These ingredients may include meats, vegetables, seafood, fruits, and medicinal herbs. It originated in the late 17th to early 18th century. At that time, Guangdong had difficulty extracting coals, which resulted in Cantonese people having to rely on firewood for fuels. This caused them to avoid using a large fire (which cooking techniques such as stir-frying require) and instead used low heat to simmer their foods – resulting in lou fo tong. Nowadays, lou fo tong has become a fully developed style of soup and became an integral part of Cantonese cuisine.

Dishes in Cantonese cuisine

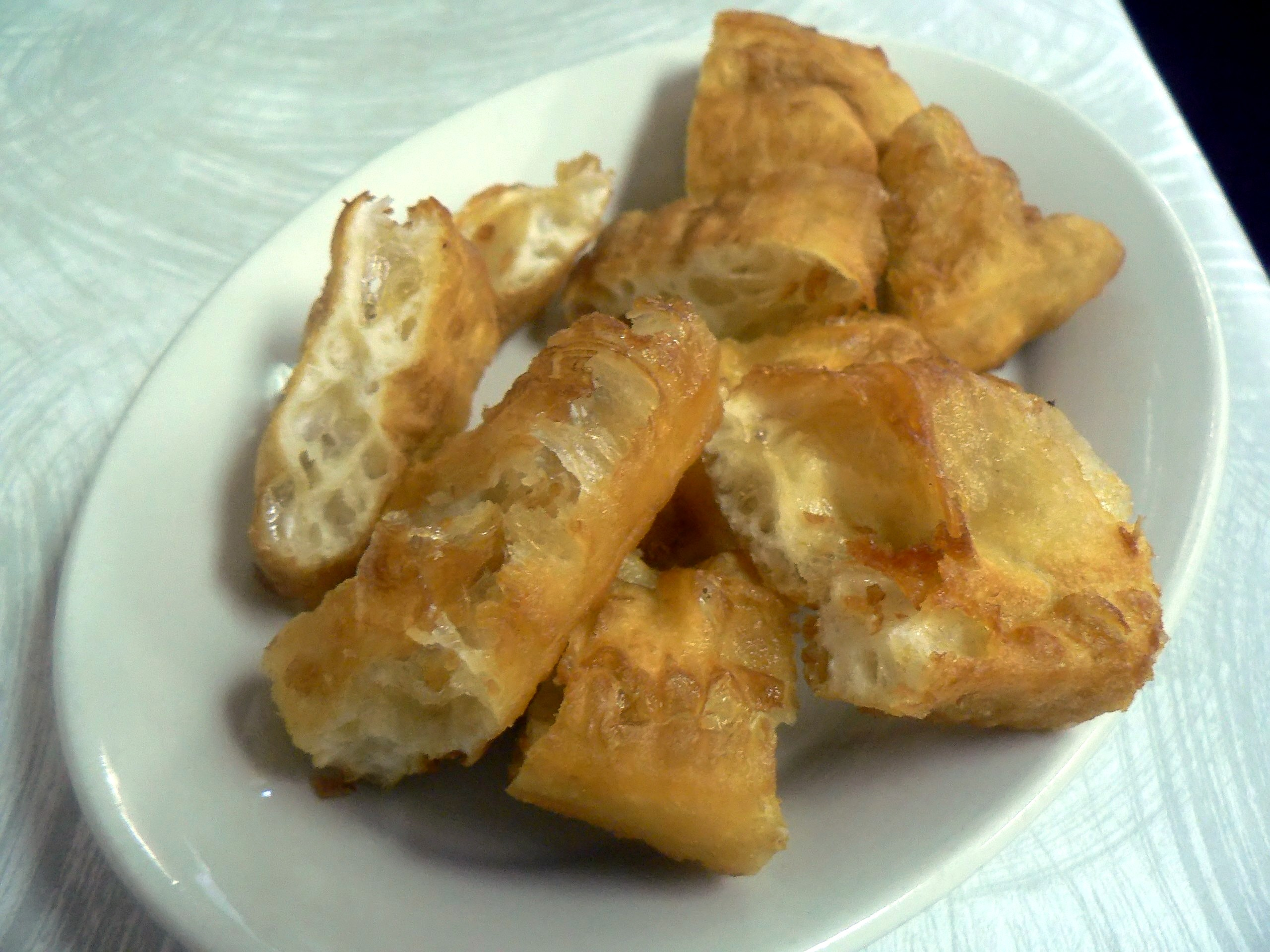
Fried bread (油炸鬼), shared by most Han Chinese groups, is common in breakfast.

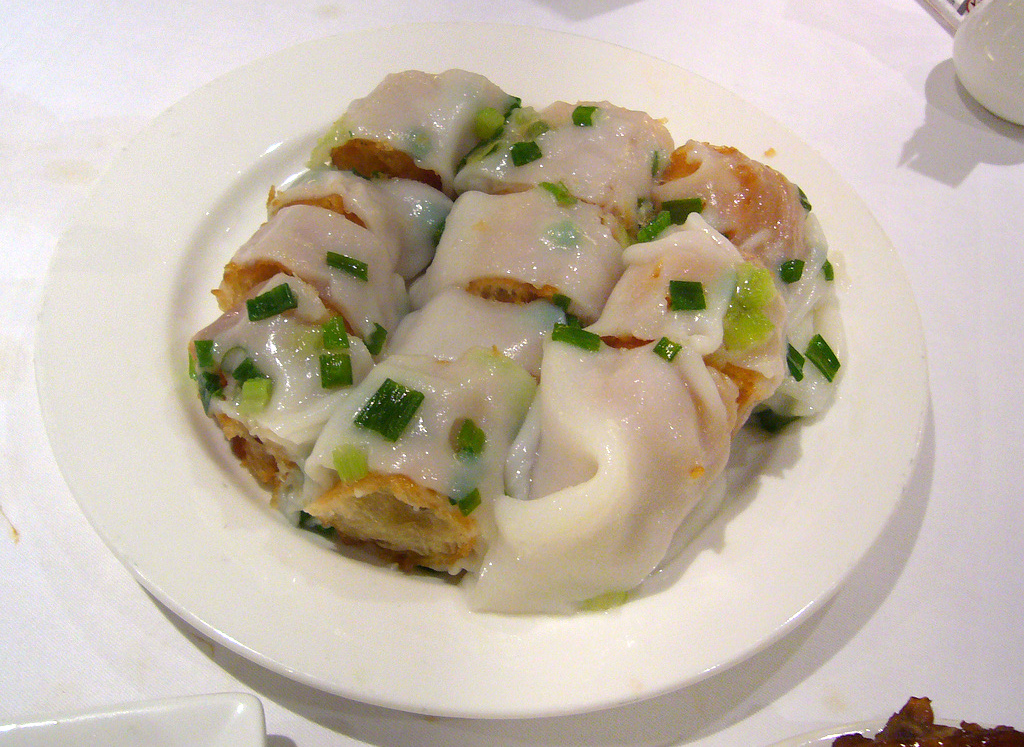
Za leung (炸兩), another popular breakfast dish, is distinctly Cantonese.

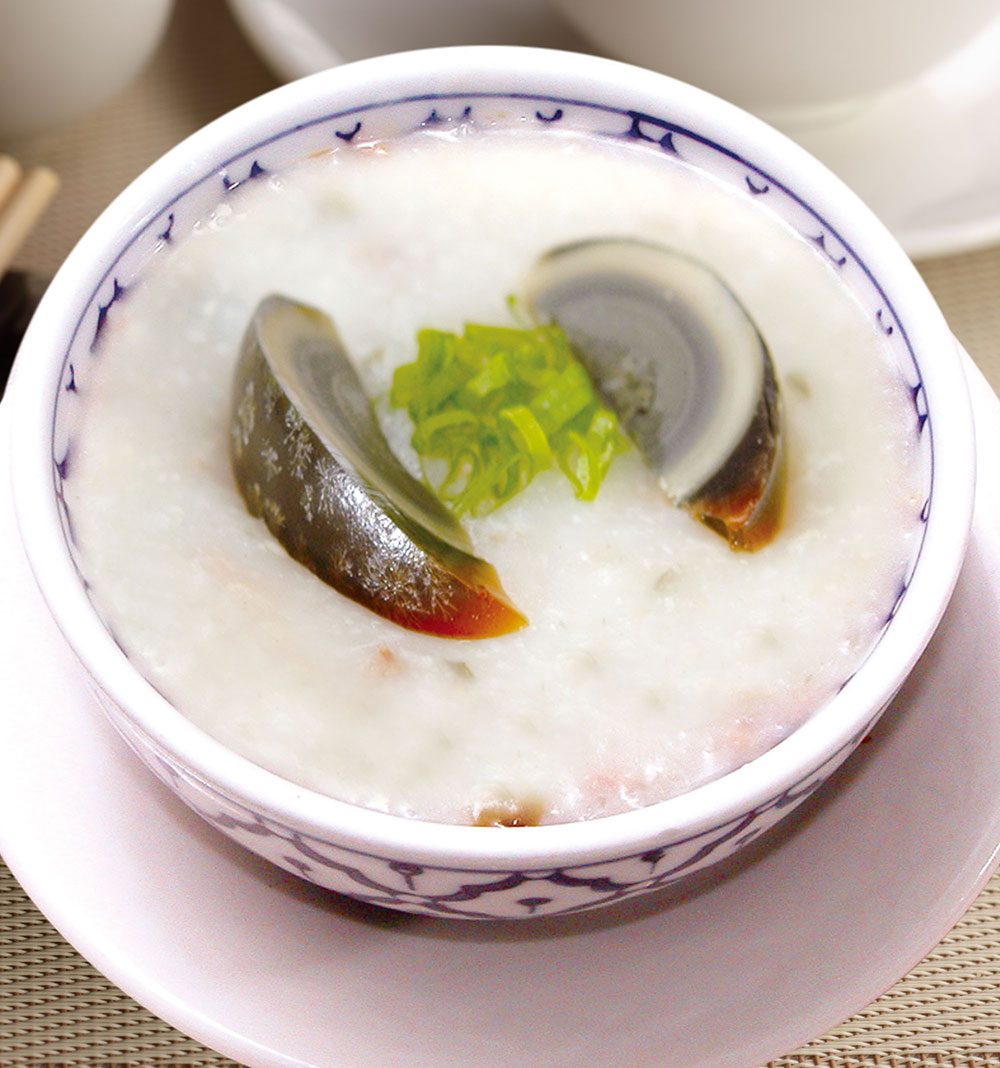
Congee with lean pork and century egg (皮蛋瘦肉粥) is also a breakfast staple.

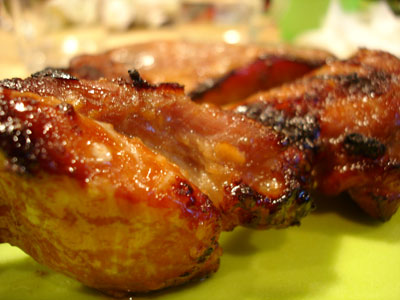
BBQ pork (叉燒) is a popular meal, with many variants in Cantonese cuisine.

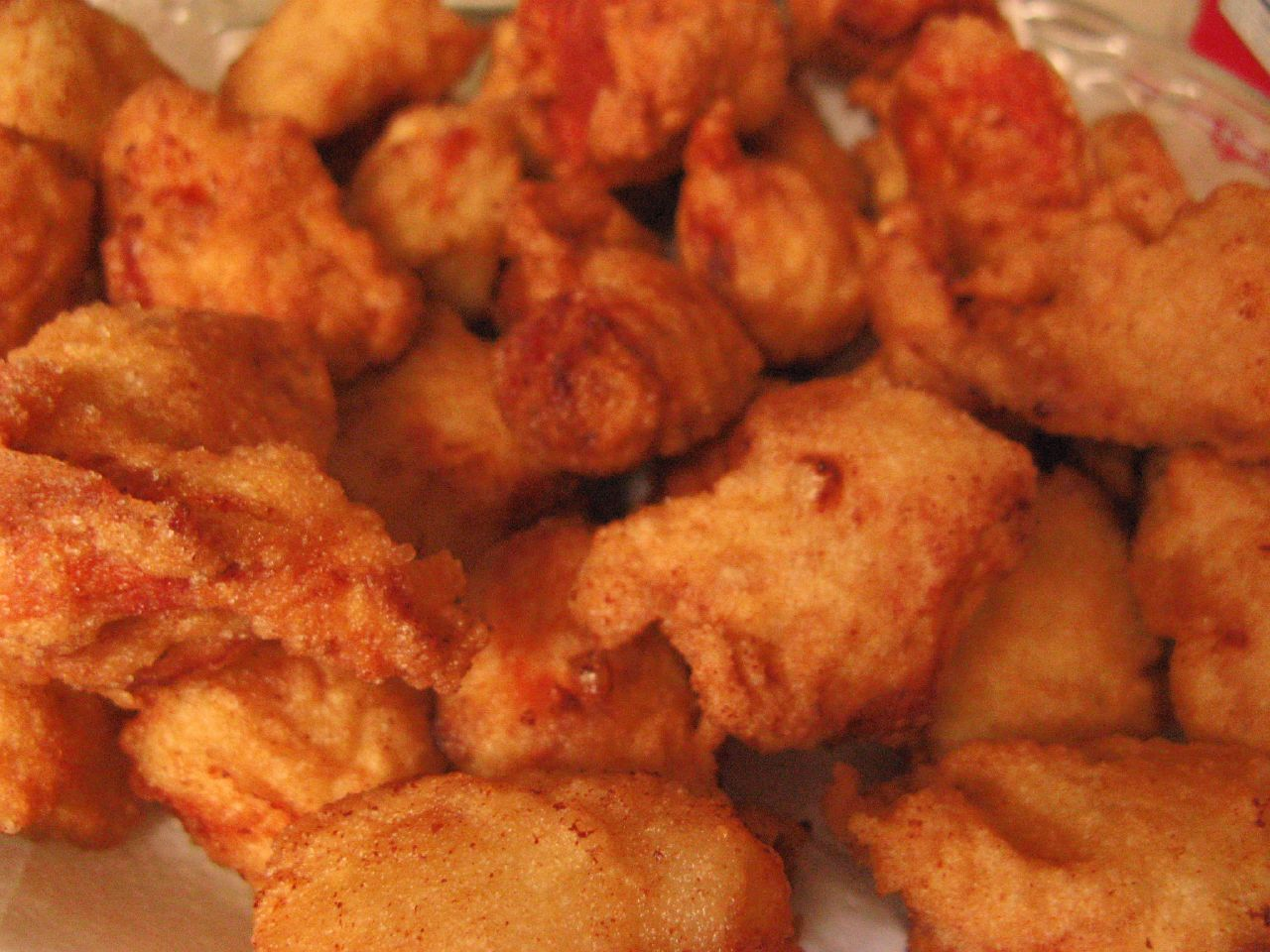
Deep-fried chicken with sweet and sour sauce

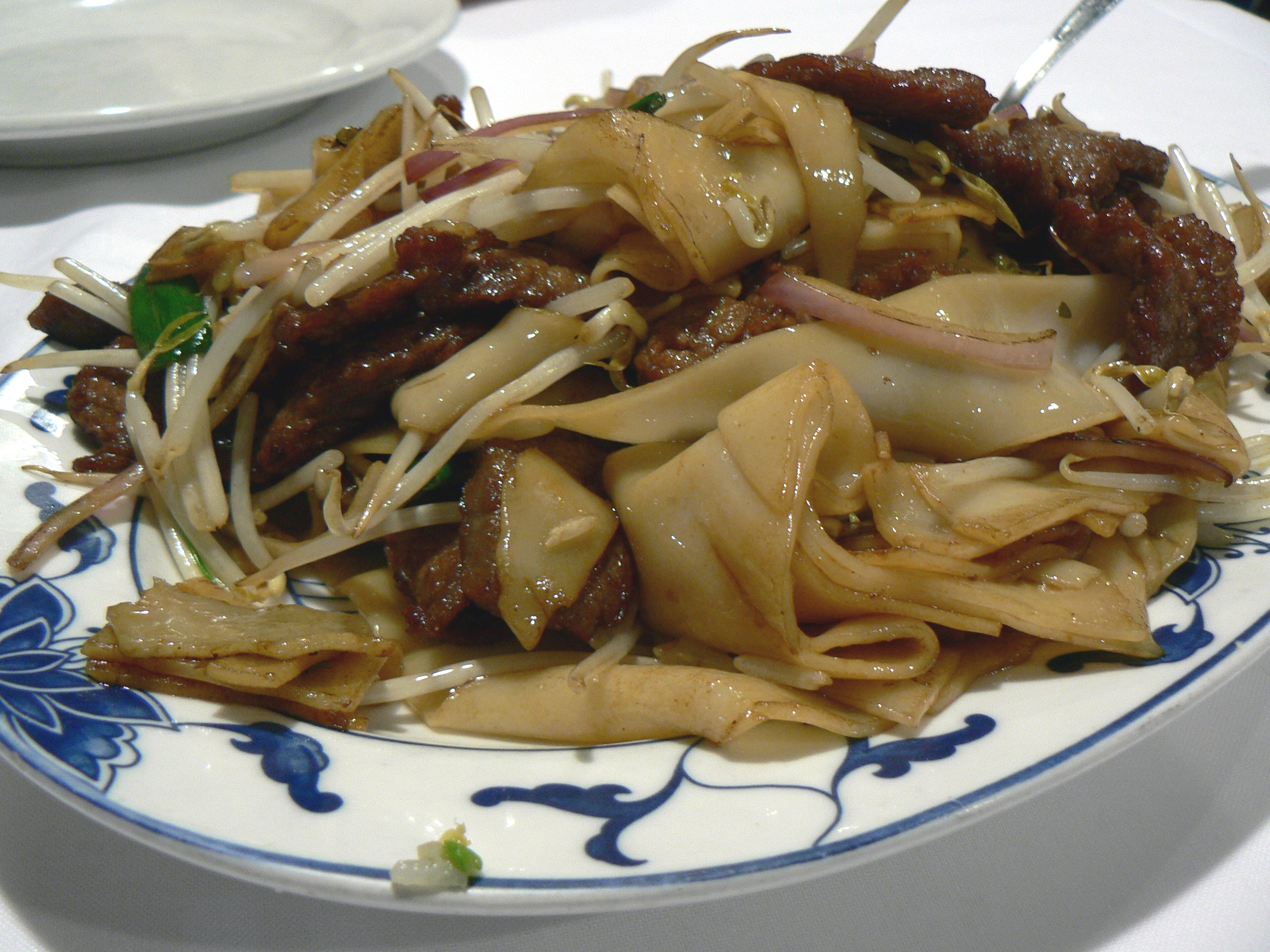
Beef chow fun (乾炒牛河) is a staple in Cantonese cuisine.

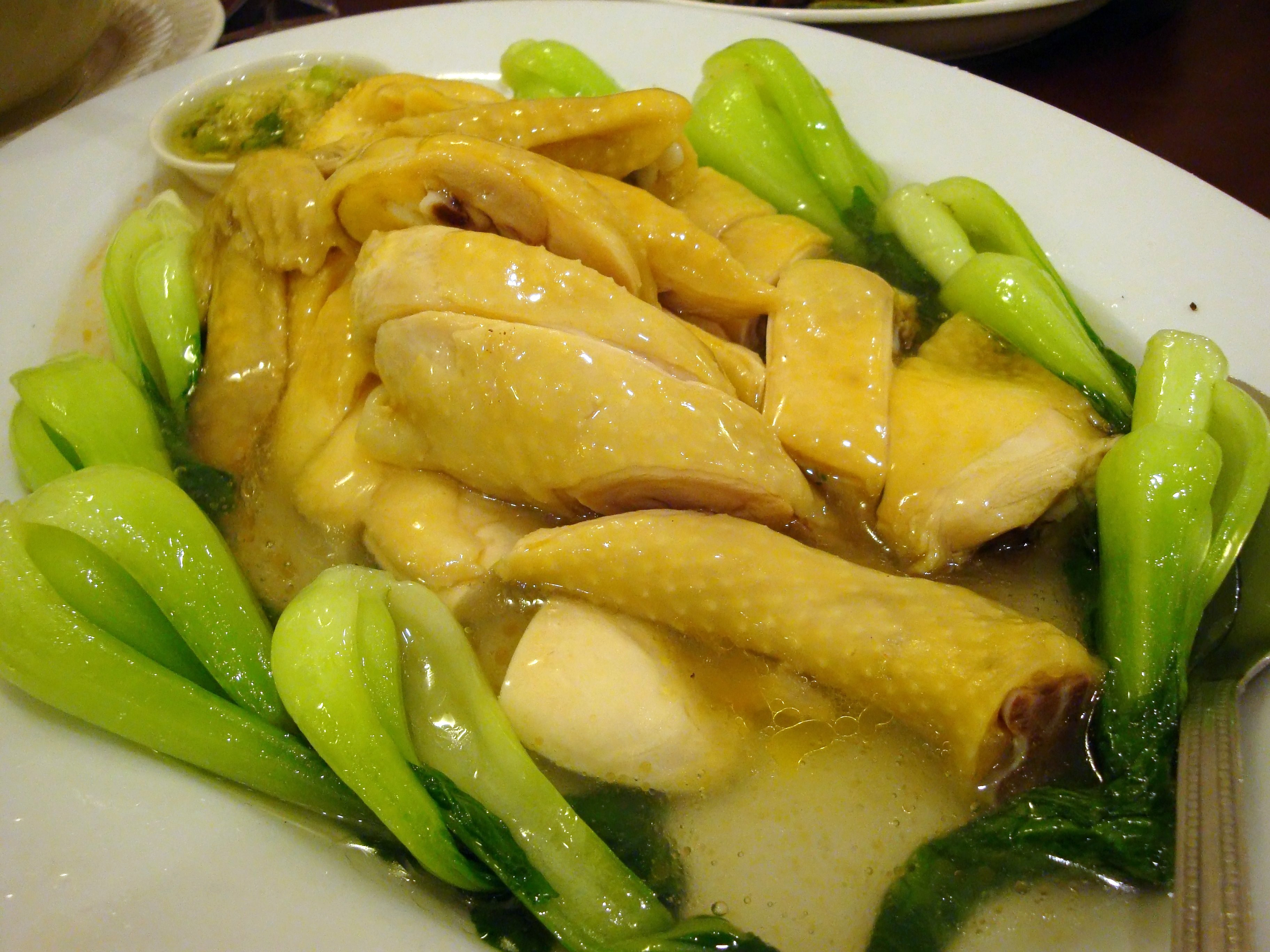
White cut chicken (白切雞), considered one of the finest dishes in Cantonese cuisine

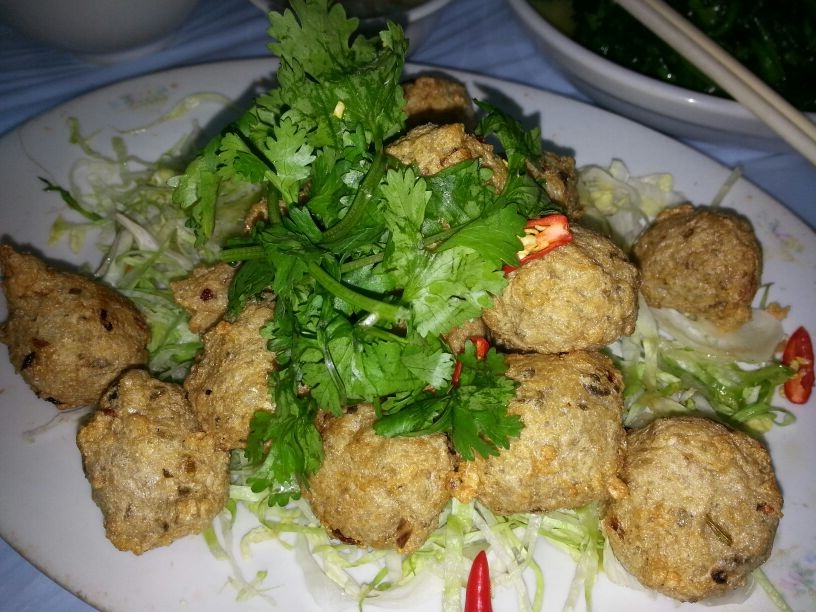
Dace fish balls (鯪魚球) are popular in Hong Kong.

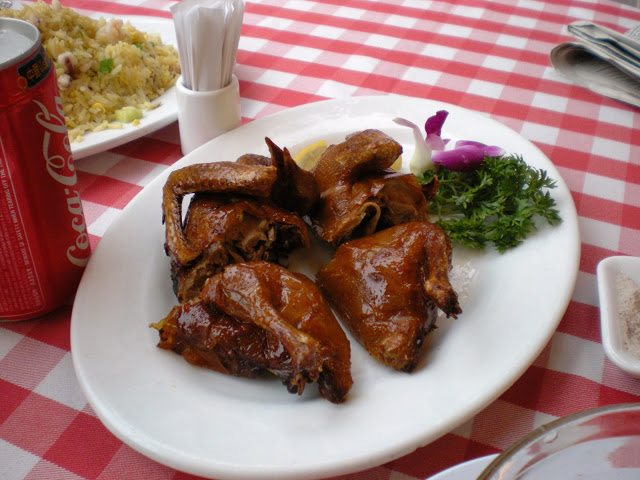
Roasted pigeons (燒乳鴿)

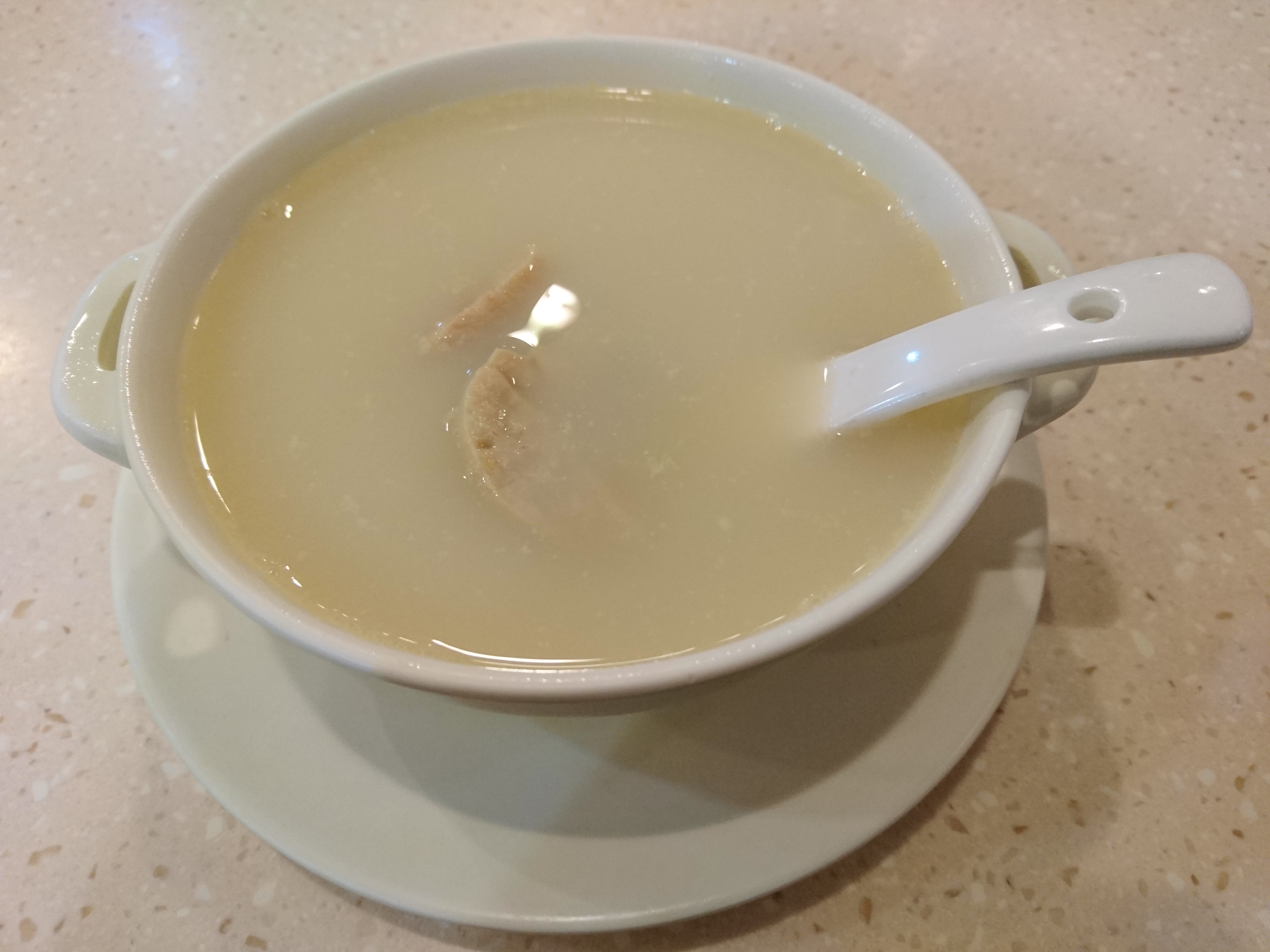
Pig lung and almond soup (杏汁豬肺湯) is a common lou fo tong.

=== Tea culture ===
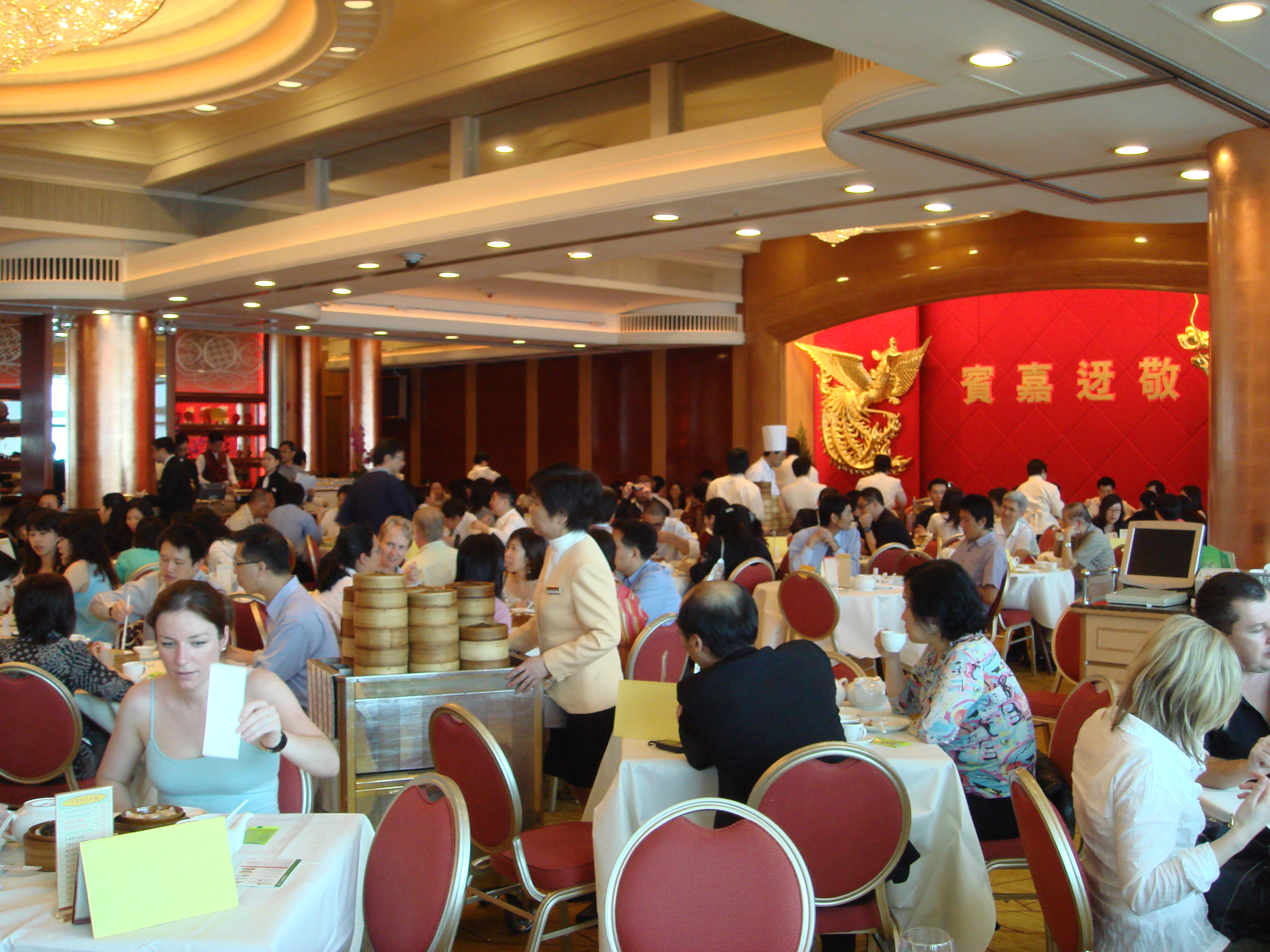
Yum cha hour in Hong Kong City Hall.

Yum cha is a subculture within Cantonese food culture. While it can be found in some other Han Chinese groups, it is far more prevalent among Cantonese people, and also overseas Chinese, historically most of whom have been of Cantonese ancestry. It has a specific set of terminologies among Cantonese. For instance, "to invite someone to go yum cha" is basically a way of expressing friendship. Traditionally, Cantonese could go yum cha whether in the morning, afternoon, or evening. Morning tea is typically dominated by the elderly, although many younger people often accompany their grandparents for morning tea as a way of showing respect and affection. Cantonese teahouses also have a set of food specifically designed for morning tea. Afternoon tea is similar in most aspects, except it is more common for entire families to go yum cha at this hour. Evening tea tends to attract large gatherings –and the food tends to be more sophisticated.

The time notwithstanding, yum cha starts with diners ordering the specific sets of teas. All manner of social interaction then occur, and their meal the diners tend to stay for half an hour or so still chatting.

==== Dim sum ====
Dim sum (Jyutping: Dim^{2} sam^{1}; Traditional Chinese: 點心, literally "to touch the heart") is a characteristic of Cantonese cuisine usually, but not only, eaten during yum cha. They are a set of small bite-sized portions of food served in small steam baskets or on small plates. In Cantonese teahouses, carts with dim sum will be moving around the restaurant for the diners to order from without having to leave their seats. In Cantonese traditions, the diners will often order dim sum at will while chatting and enjoying the endless serving of teas.

In major cities in Lingnan, such as Guangzhou and Hong Kong, culinary schools usually offer courses specifically to train the preparation of dim sum.

=== Leung cha ===
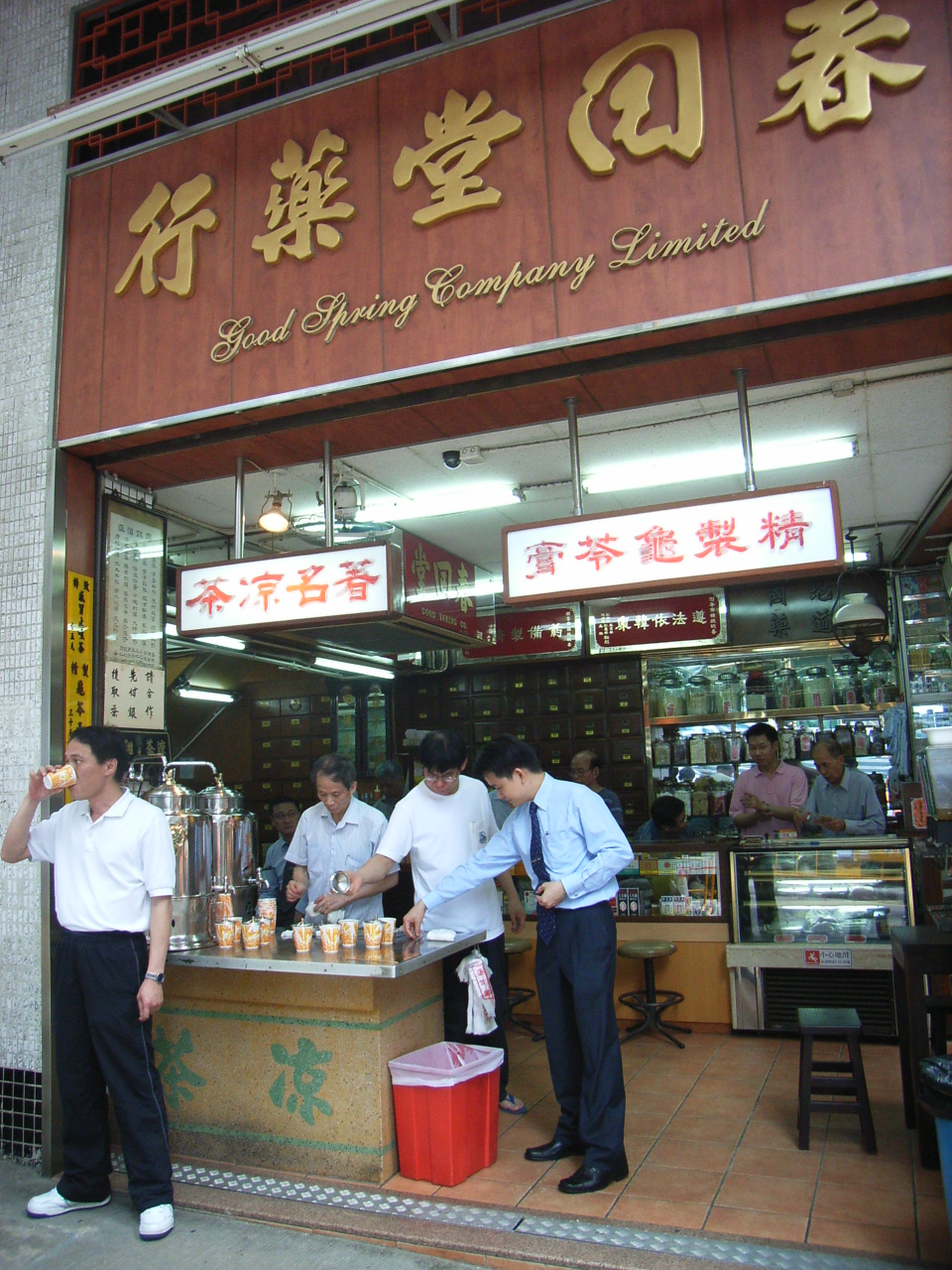
A leung cha shop in Stanley Street, Hong Kong

Leung cha (涼茶; loeng4 caa4, lit. cool tea) is a kind of infusion made from traditional medicinal herbs. In traditional Chinese medicine, leung cha is used to treat shanghuo and is considered to have a cooling effect on the body. Herbal tea was a unique drink in Lingnan. It is said that herbal tea had appeared before the Qing dynasty. Lingnan is located in a subtropical zone in which the climate is characterized by hot and humid summers and mild winters. People living in subtropical environments are more likely to suffer from ailments such as skin diseases and gastroenteritis, which herbal teas such as leung cha are thought to treat. Drinking herbal tea gradually became widespread as a custom in China, as well as the rest of East Asia. In major cities such as Guangzhou and Hong Kong, "cool tea shops", which specialize in selling herb teas, are common sights.

Due to the efforts of the governments of Guangdong Province, Hong Kong, and Macau, methods to make leung cha have been considered an intangible cultural heritage practice in China since 2006.

The collected standards of the National Medical Products Administration include formulas for the following leung cha: Guangdong, Shaxi, Luofushan, noon-time (午时茶), five-flower (五花茶), Gam Wo (甘和茶), and Shiqi.

=== Tong sui ===
Tong sui is a characteristic dessert of Cantonese cuisine. It is a set of sweet, warm soups or custards served as dessert at the end of a meal in Cantonese traditions. It is also common for Cantonese people to leave home to get some tong sui with a group of friends or family late in the evening, an activity called "siu yeh". Choices of types of tong sui vary depending on the season: hot black sesame soup, for instance, tends to be favored in winter.

=== Brewery ===
Lingnan is also known for producing some notable liquors, mostly of the rice wine variety. The brewery culture of Lingnan can be traced all the way back to the kingdom of Nanyue, who apparently possessed containers of liquors. In the late 11th century, Su Shi (pronounced as "Sou Sik" in Cantonese), one of the prominent poets and then minister of the Song Empire, got demoted and reassigned to Lingnan. Also well known for his love for cuisine, Sou Sik wrote a book on brewery not long after his reassignment to Lingnan, called "Su Shi's Words on Liquors" (東坡酒經), which became Lingnan's first book on brewery.

Rice wine can be consumed directly, or can be used as a cooking ingredient.

Nowadays, rice wines produced in Lingnan are sold across China and other Asian countries, with Yuk Bing Siu (玉冰燒, lit. "jade, ice, and burn"), one of the "Ten Great Liquors of Guangdong", being particularly renowned.

=== Fruits ===
"The Four Great Fruits of Lingnan" (嶺南四大名果) are four fruits locally planted in Lingnan and are frequently used in Cantonese cuisine and desserts. They are lychee, banana, pineapple, and papaya.

=== Gallery ===
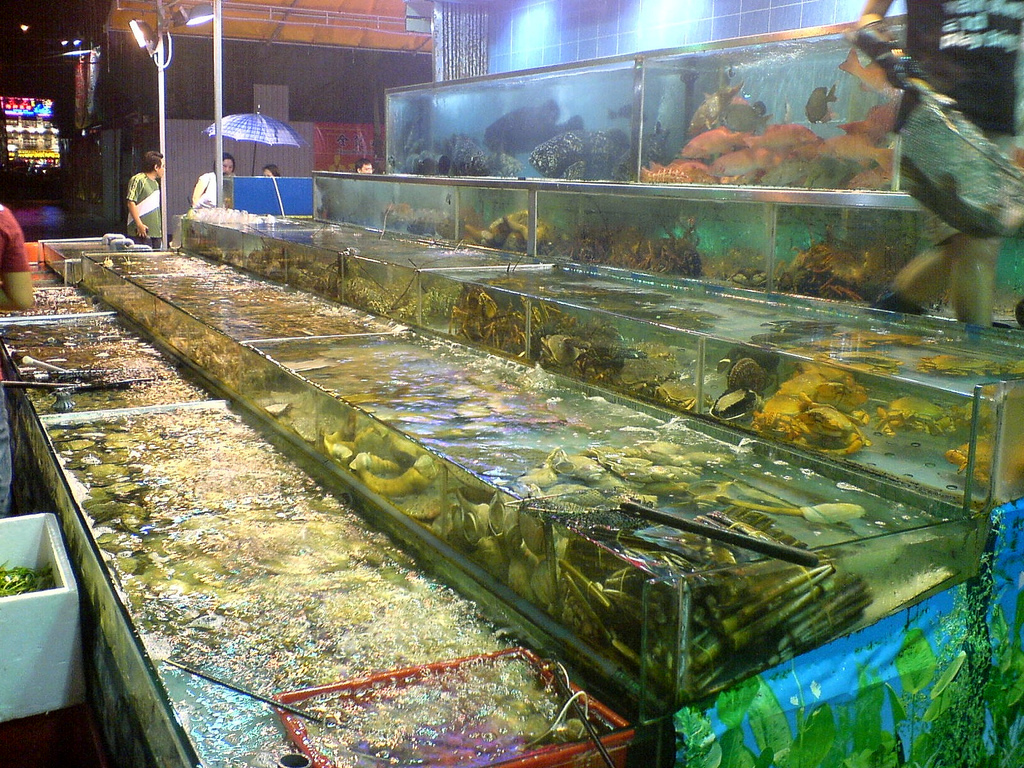
Cantonese often run seafood restaurants by the sea, using fish tanks such as those pictured to keep the seafood. It is a common sight in Lingnan.

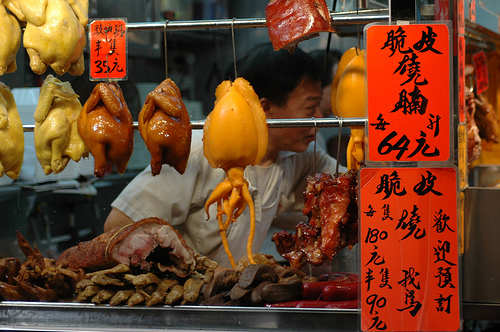
Cantonese also like siu lap (lit. "roasted delicacies").

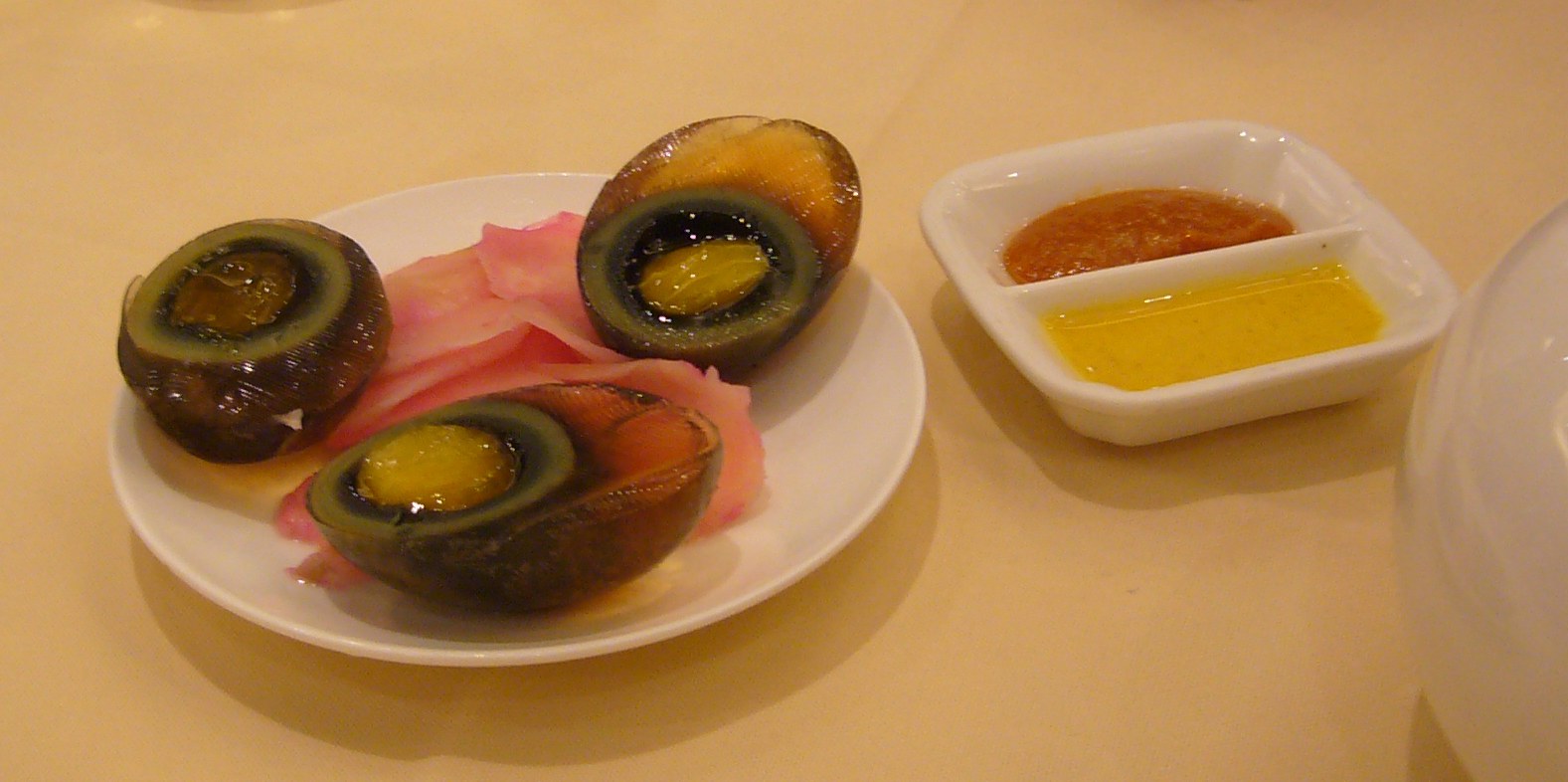
Century eggs are commonly used in Cantonese cuisine.

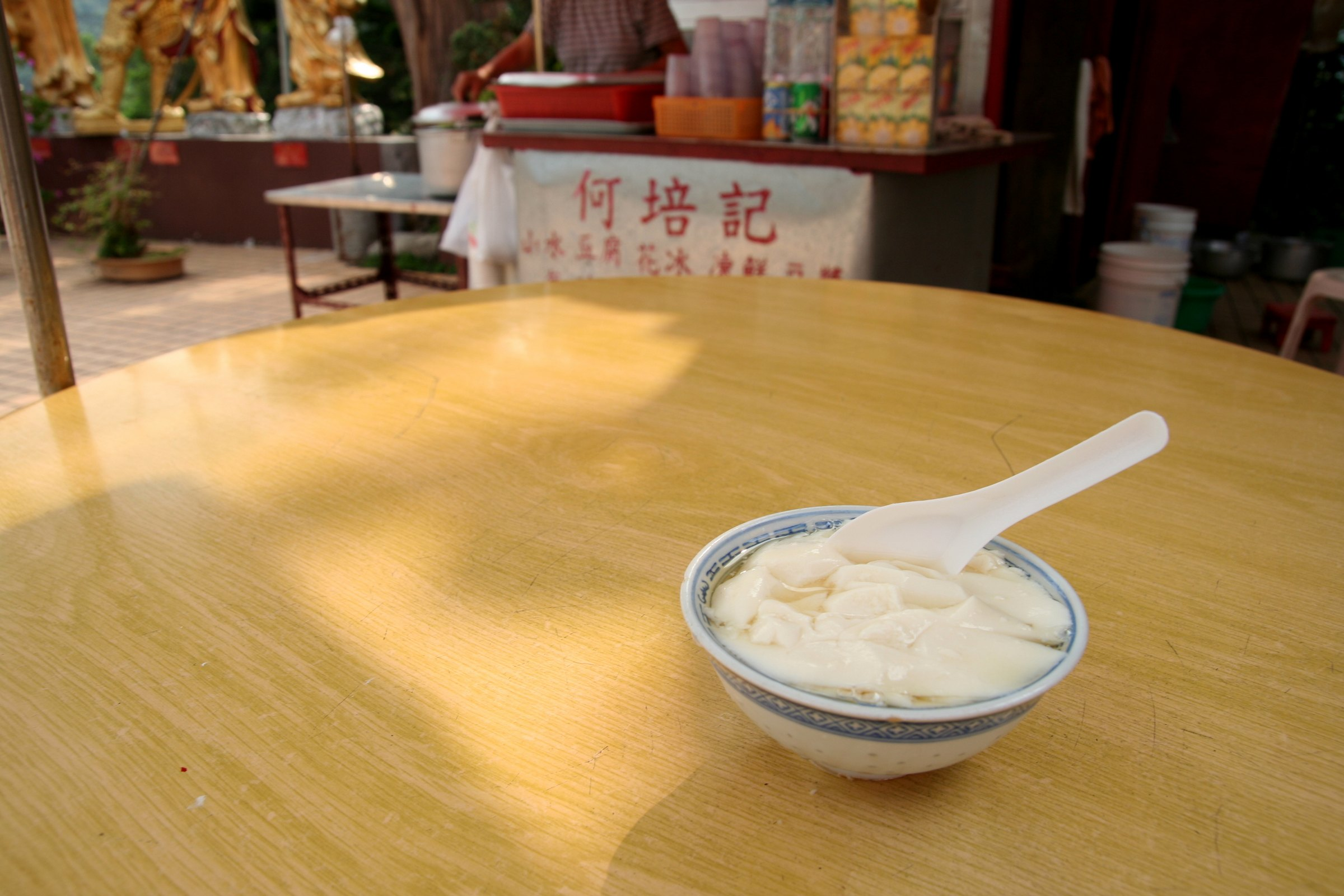
Bean curd tong sui (豆腐花)

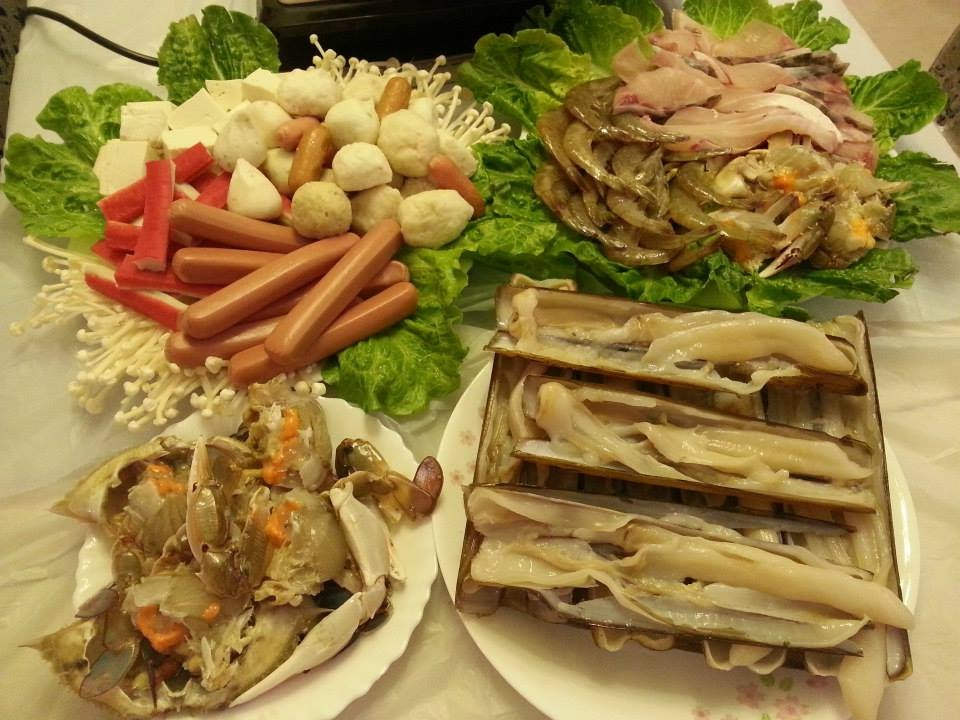
Cantonese-style hotpots typically involve a lot of seafood. The one pictured, for instance, includes solenidae, crabs, prawns, and fishballs.

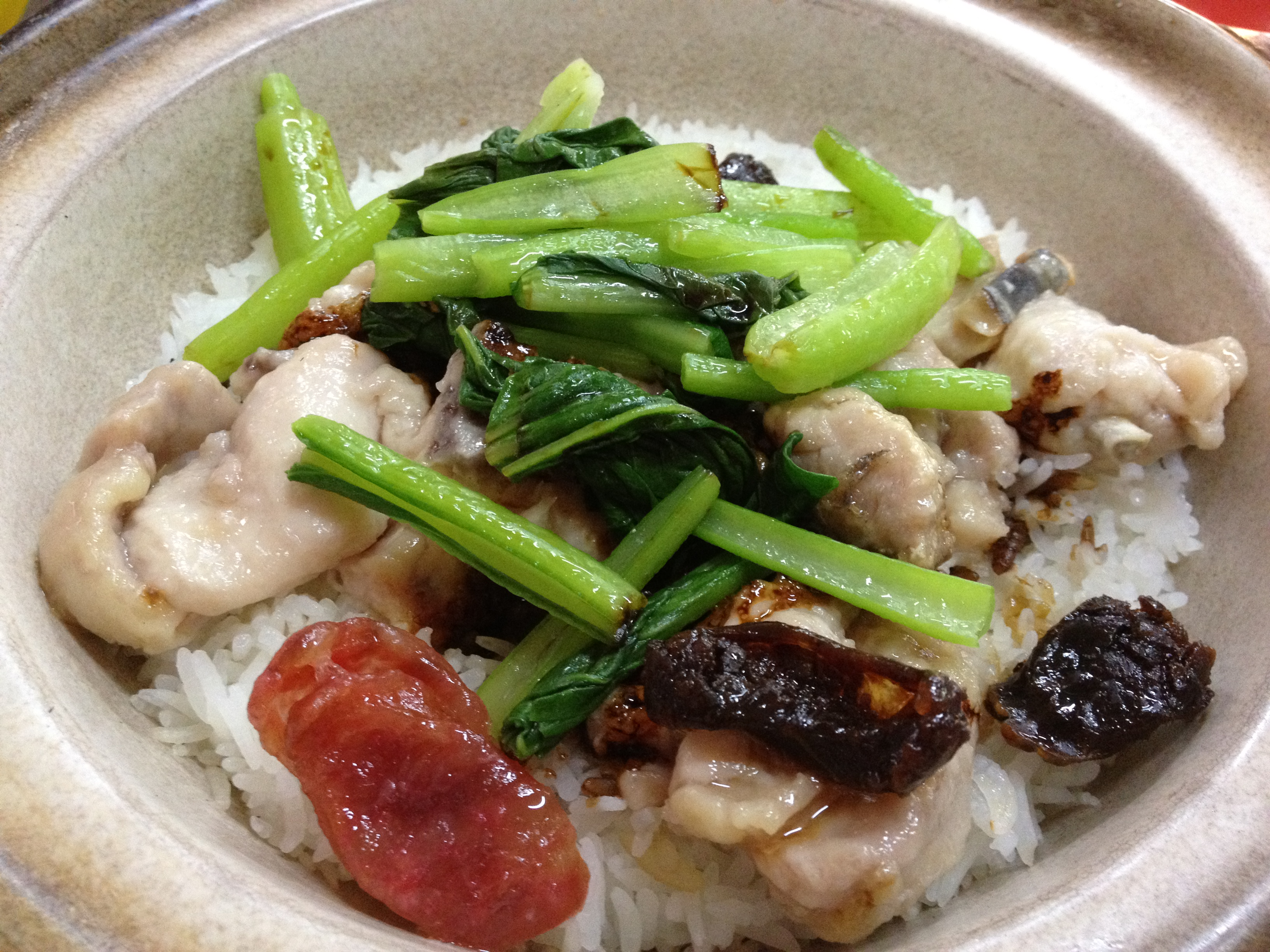
Claypot rice is also a delicacy in Cantonese cuisine.

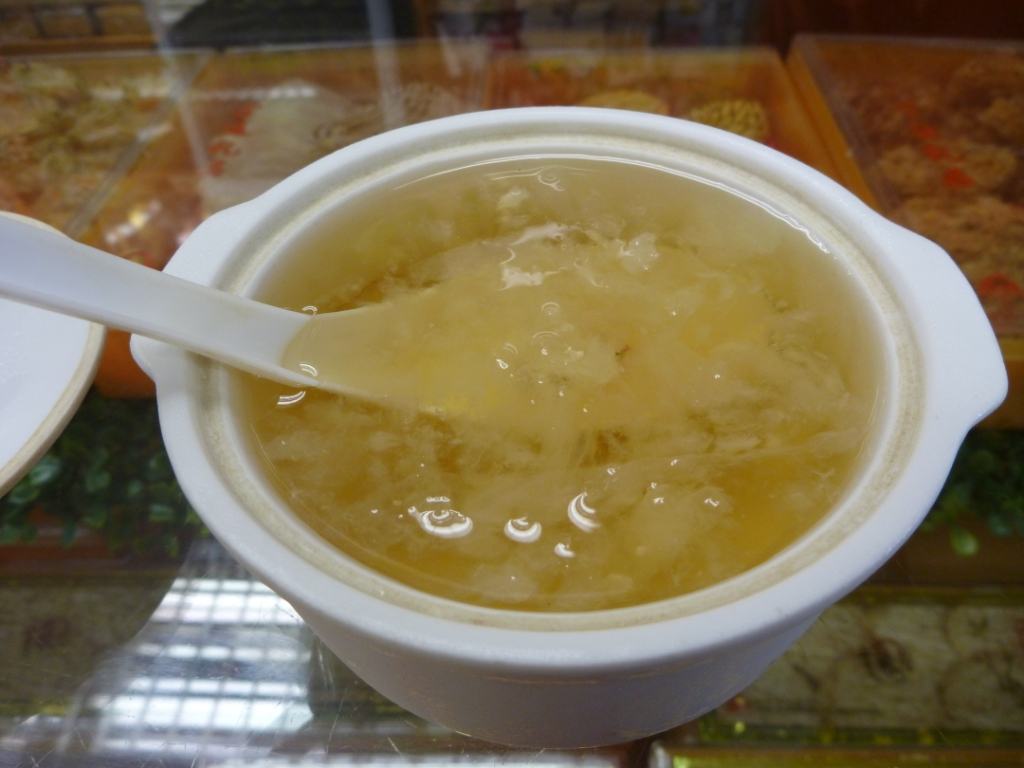
Bird's nest soups are popularly believed to be beneficial for health.

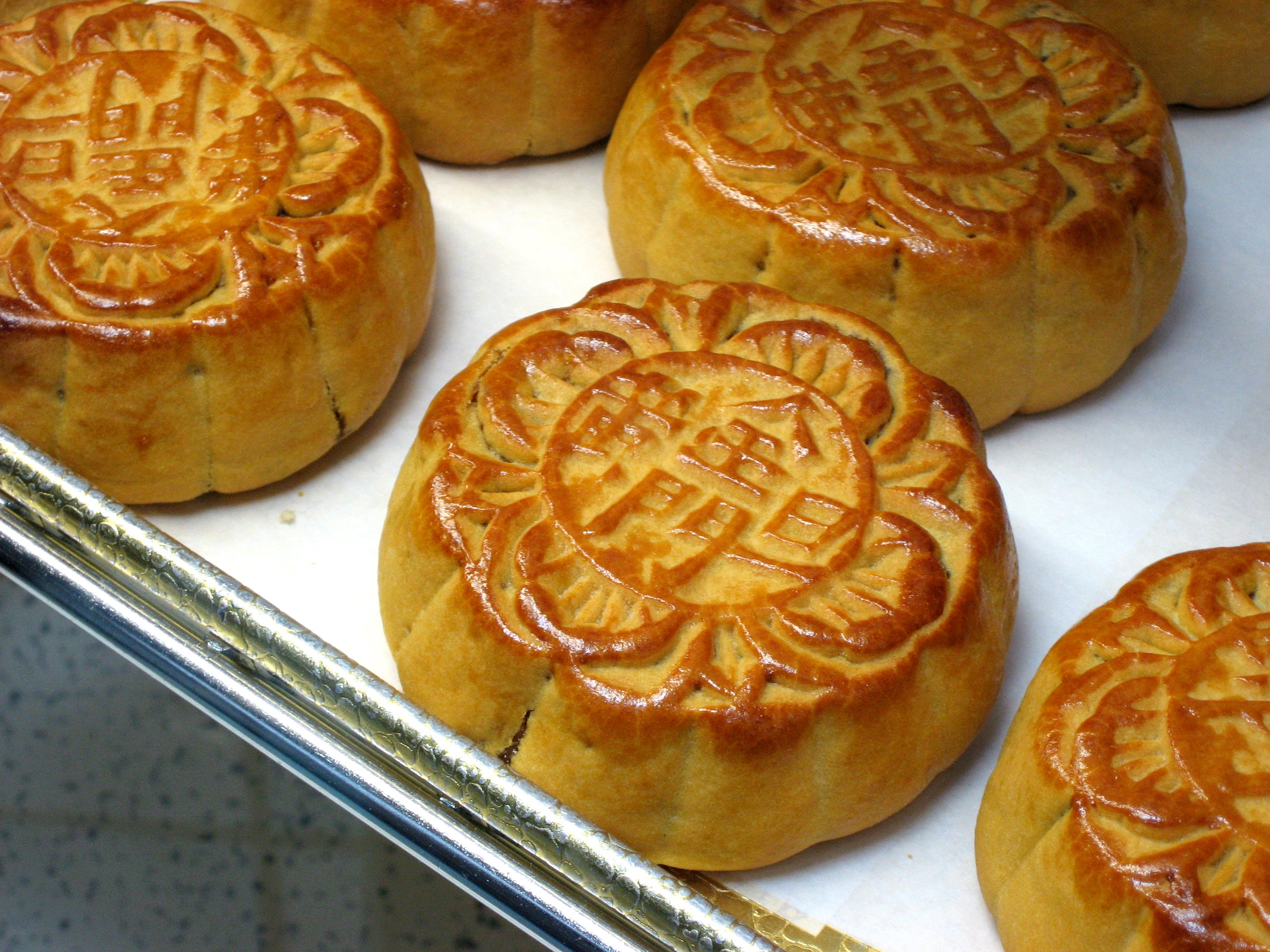
Cantonese also have their own style of mooncake.

== Martial arts ==
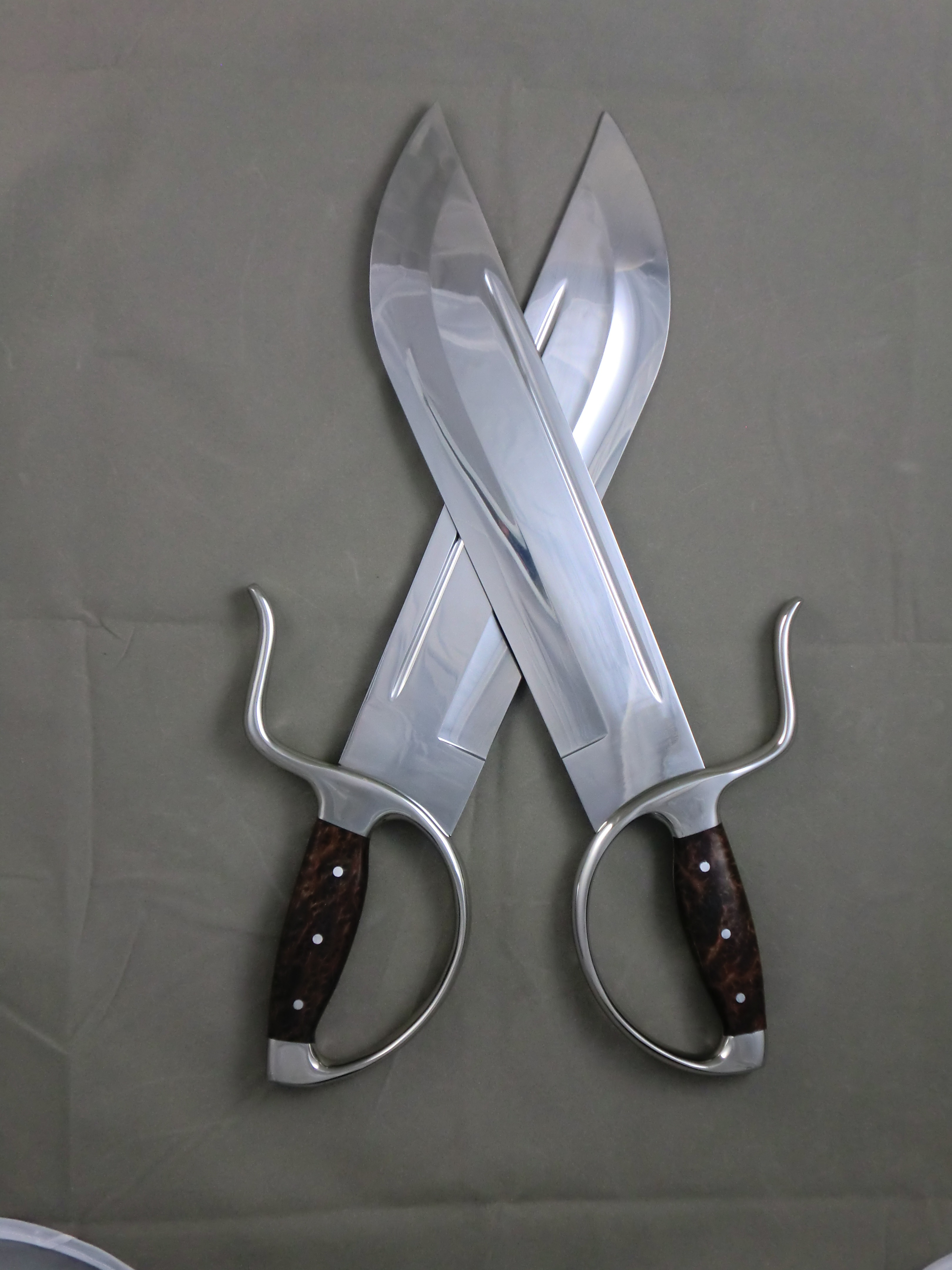
Butterfly sword is a popular weapon among practitioners of Cantonese kung fu schools.

Cantonese people also have their own schools of kung fu. Originally disorganized, the fighting techniques of Cantonese people were grouped into different schools between the 18th to 19th centuries. At that time, pirates and bandits were rampant in the empire's fringe regions such as Lingnan. This resulted in Cantonese starting to want to protect themselves, and thus the proliferation of martial arts learning. That was when the Cantonese people organized their fighting techniques into schools, forming the martial arts schools seen among Cantonese today. Martial arts folk heroes from that period, such as Wong Fei-hung, are now popular topics of Cantonese films.

Overall, Cantonese martial arts are known for its emphasis on striking in various different ways using punches, while maintaining a steady lower body posture. They often shout battle cries (for the purpose of unnerving the opponents), rarely jump, kick, or do any elaborate large movements – a very pragmatic style focused on striking. Kung fu schools invented and primarily practiced by Cantonese people include, but are not limited to:

=== Guangdong schools ===
- Chow Gar
- Choy gar
- Choy Li Fut
- Hung Ga
- Mok Gar
- Wing Chun

== Philosophy ==
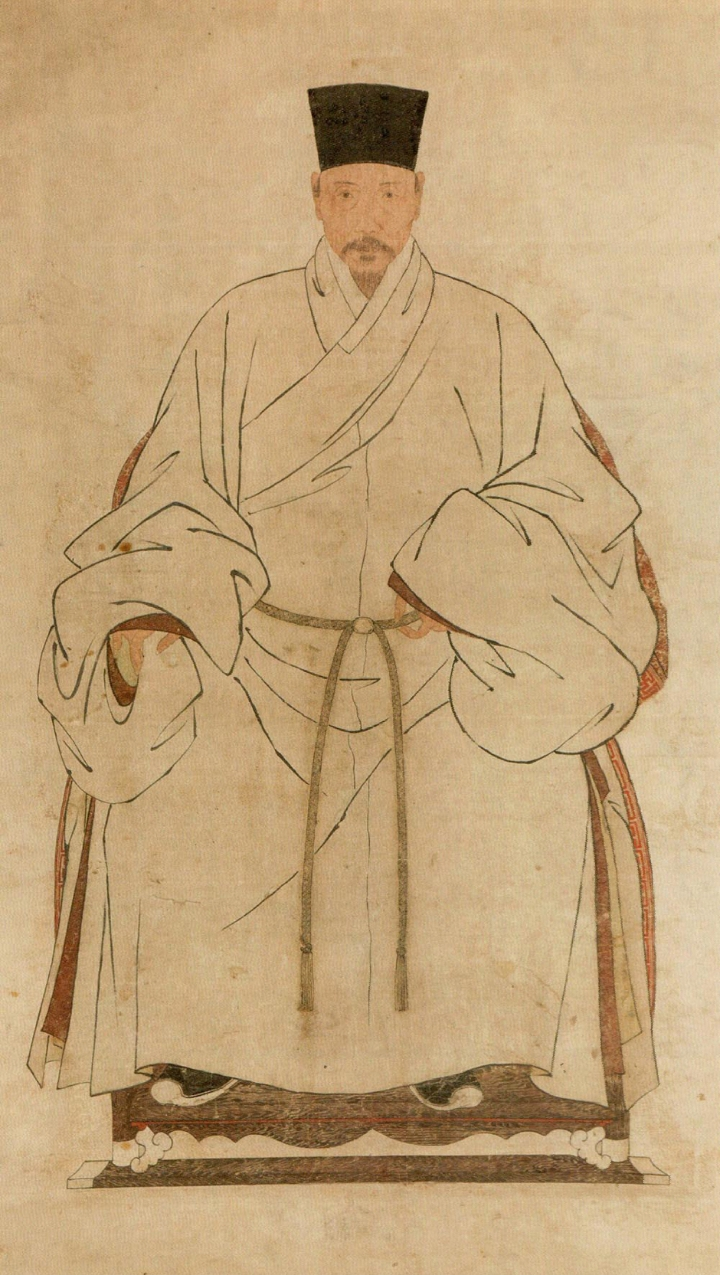
The portrait of Chan Bak-sa ("Chen Baisha" in Mandarin)

Lingnan also has its own schools of Confucianism. Since the 12th century, there has been a steady stream of Cantonese Neo-Confucian thinkers, resulting in several schools of thought.

=== Lingnan scholarly school ===
Lingnan scholarly school (嶺南學派; ling5 naam4 hok6 paai3) is the most prominent of schools of Neo-Confucian thought in Lingnan. It was started by a group of Cantonese Confucian scholars in the 15th century, led by Chan Bak-sa. Chan's writings have now been compiled in a document titled "Chan Bak-sa's Collection" (陳獻章集). In this series of writings, Chan expressed his opinions of Confucius's thoughts and reinterpreted them through the lens of Mahayana Buddhism and Taoism. His style of thought has a strong theme of humanism and individualism. It also appeared to have been influenced by Western styles of thought in its belief in more rational ways of thinking than older Confucian thought.

== Traditional celebrations ==
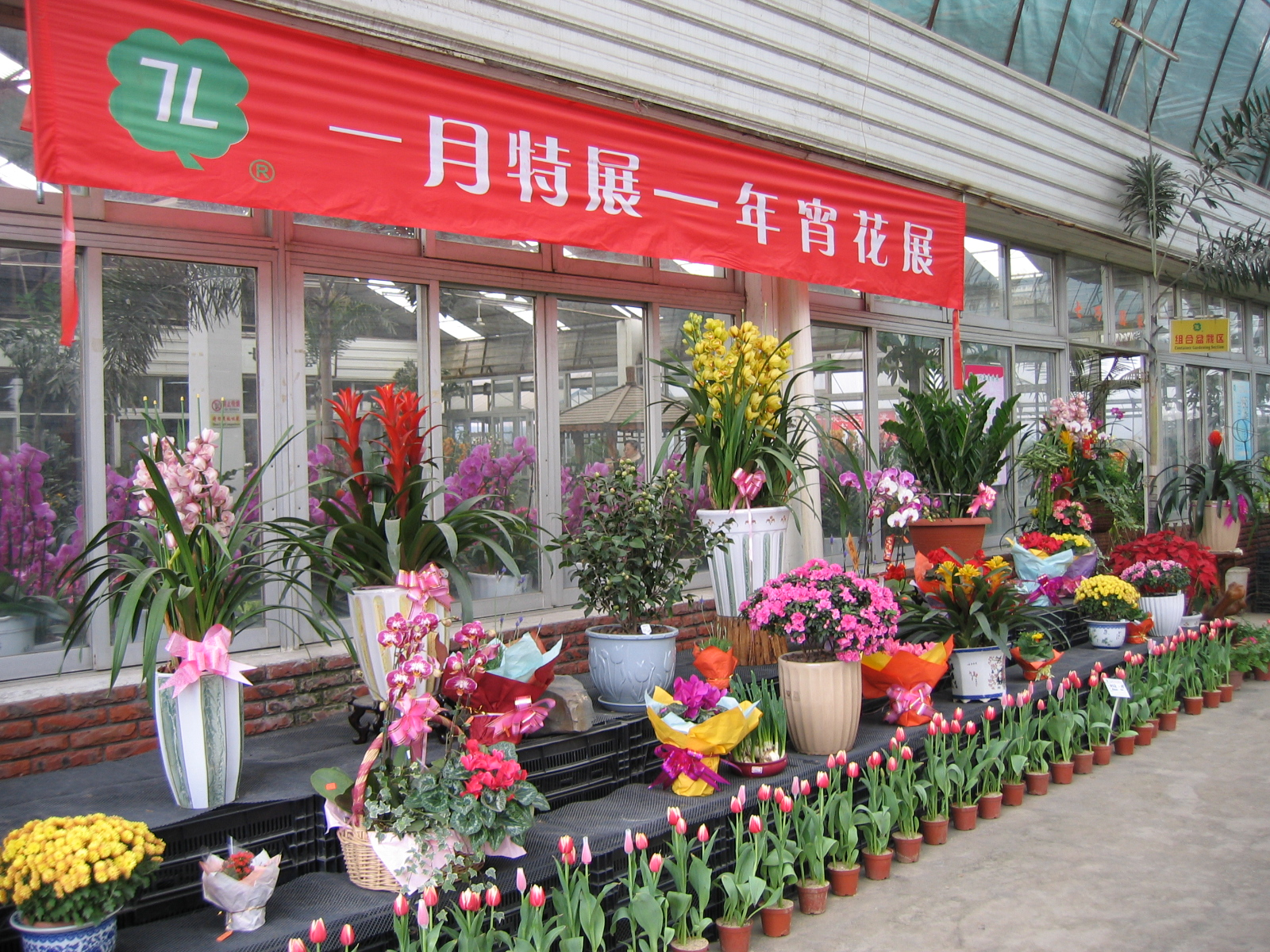
Traditionally, Cantonese buy flowers to give as gifts and decorate their homes during Lunar New Year, resulting in the proliferation of flower fairs before and during Lunar New Year. Guangzhou, the cultural capital of Lingnan, has even been called "the flower city".

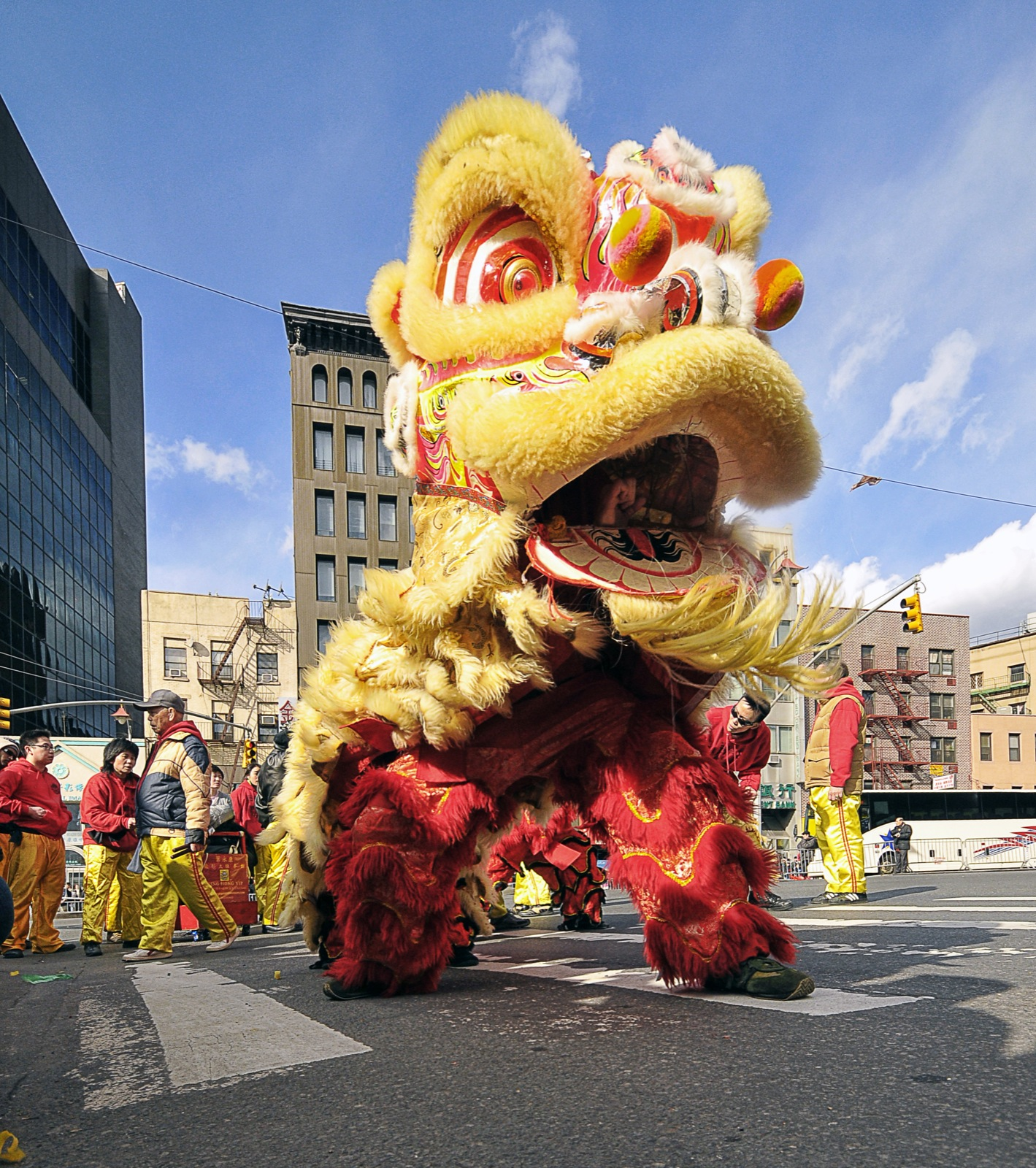
New York City Chinatown has many overseas Chinese of Cantonese ancestry. In this picture, they are doing their own style of lion dance.

Cantonese people also have a distinct set of traditional celebrations. Many of these celebrations are shared by other Han Chinese groups and even other East Asians. The Ghost Festival, for instance, is observed by Japanese and many Southeast Asians as well. However, Cantonese often have their own unique customs. For instance, New Year flower fairs are seen only among Cantonese and certain overseas Chinese communities of Cantonese ancestry. The Lingnan region also has certain celebrations unique to the area.

=== Cantonese New Year customs ===
- New Year flower market
- Cantonese lion dance
- Nin Lai

=== Han Chinese celebrations ===
- Lunar New Year
- First Full Moon Festival
- Buddha's Birthday
- Qingming Festival
- Dragon Boat Festival
- Birthday of Guanyin
- Ghost Festival
- Mid-Autumn Festival
- Double Ninth Festival

=== Cantonese-specific celebrations ===
- Guangdong Festival of Joy (廣東歡樂節; gwong2 dung1 fun1 lok6 zit3);
- Cantonese Temple Fair (廣府廟會; gwong2 fu2 miu6 wui6);
- Foshan Autumn (佛山秋色; fat6 saan1 cau1 sik1);
- Self-selling Festival (賣身節; maai6 san1 zit3);
- Guangzhou Lotus Festival (羊城荷花節; joeng4 sing4 ho4 faa1 zit3);
- Kite Festival (風箏節; fung1 zang1 zit3);
- Flying Colors Parade (飄色巡遊; piu1 sik1 ceon4 jau4)

==== Birthdays of local deities ====
- Birthday of Hung Shing (1st and 15th day of any lunar month)
- Birthday of Mazu (23rd day of the 3rd lunar month)
- Birthday of Yun-mou (3rd day of the 3rd lunar month)
- Birthday of Tam Kung (8th day of the 4th month)
- Birthday of Lady Sin (24th day of the 11th lunar month)

== Religions ==
Traditionally, the Lingnan region is dominated by two religions – Mahayana Buddhism and Taoism.

=== Mahayana Buddhism ===
Compared to worshipping Confucius, Cantonese are traditionally more inclined towards worshipping The Buddha and Bodhisattvas of the Mahayana branch of Buddhism, which is shared by most Han Chinese groups. Mahayana Buddhist temples are a common sight in Lingnan, and Buddhist celebrations such as Buddha's Birthday and the Birthday of Guanyin are, traditionally, large events in the region.

The Wan-mun sect of Mahayana Buddhism originated in Lingnan and once spread across much of China during the Northern Song dynasty (10th to 12th century).

=== Taoism ===
All Han Chinese groups traditionally adhere to some forms of Taoism, and the Cantonese are no exception. The Cantonese have a distinct set of Taoist deities. Cantonese people are, traditionally, worshippers of Wong Tai Sin, a Taoist god of healing. They are also strongly inclined to worship sea deities such as Hung Shing and Mazu – reflecting the Cantonese tradition of doing trades overseas.

=== Culture of distance from Confucius ===
It has been noted that Cantonese culture is traditionally marked by a "culture of distance from Confucius" (遠儒文化; jyun5 jyu4 man4 faa3, lit. "culture of distance from Confucius"), which may be related to Lingnan historically being a fringe region of the Chinese Empire, and influence from the Tang dynasty (who placed greater emphasis on Taoism and Buddhism than Confucianism): While Confucian philosophy still has its deep influence on Cantonese culture, Confucius Temples are harder to find in Lingnan than Buddhist or Taoist ones.

=== Others ===
Cantonese people have a long tradition of doing commerce with the outside world, including Western Europeans, starting from the 15th century, which resulted in Christianity (mostly the Roman Catholic and Protestant variants) gaining a foothold in the region.

== Commercial tradition ==
In the past two thousand years, Lingnan (especially the area around Guangzhou) has spent much of the time being the Chinese Empire's main port, resulting in a strong commercial tradition, formation of renowned Cantonese trade organizations such as the Canton Factories, and even Cantonese developing their own business culture: Cantonese merchants are known for being pragmatic, having a preference for actual profits over fame, and the avoidance of political matters and displays of wealth. Nowadays, Cantonese people still inherit this commercial culture. Major Lingnan cities such as Guangzhou, Foshan, Shenzhen, and Hong Kong are regional (if not international) commercial centers. Hong Kong, for instance, scored 748 in 2016's Global Financial Centres Index, ranking fourth in the world and just below London and New York City.

== Cultural symbols ==
=== Red cotton flower ===
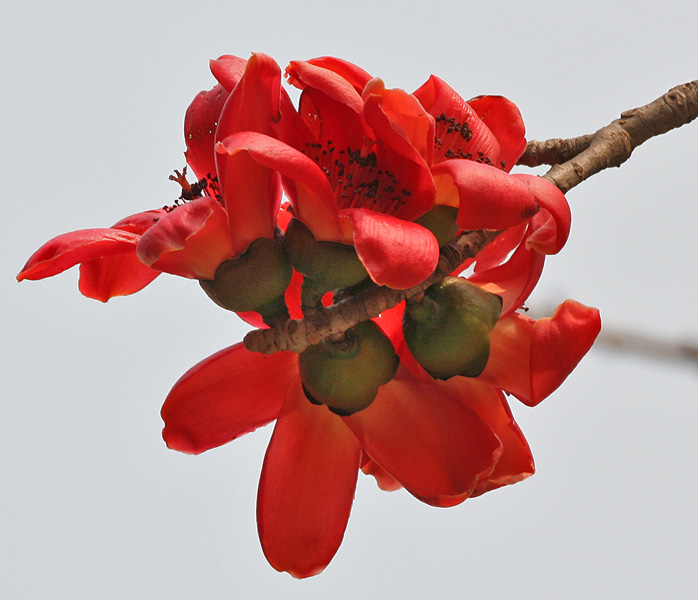
Red cotton flower

Red cotton flower (木棉花; muk6 min4 faa1, lit. "wood cotton flower") is a species of flower common in Lingnan, and is considered to symbolize Cantonese culture. It was said that in 200 BCE, Ziu To, the king of the Nanyue kingdom, once gave a red cotton tree to the Han Empire to express respect – meaning that at that time, the people of Lingnan already used red cotton flowers to represent their homeland. Nowadays, red cotton flower frequently appears in the poems and songs composed by Cantonese people. Red cotton flower is currently the official symbol of Guangzhou, the cultural center of Lingnan, and also of Guangdong and Guangxi as a whole.

=== Macau lotus ===
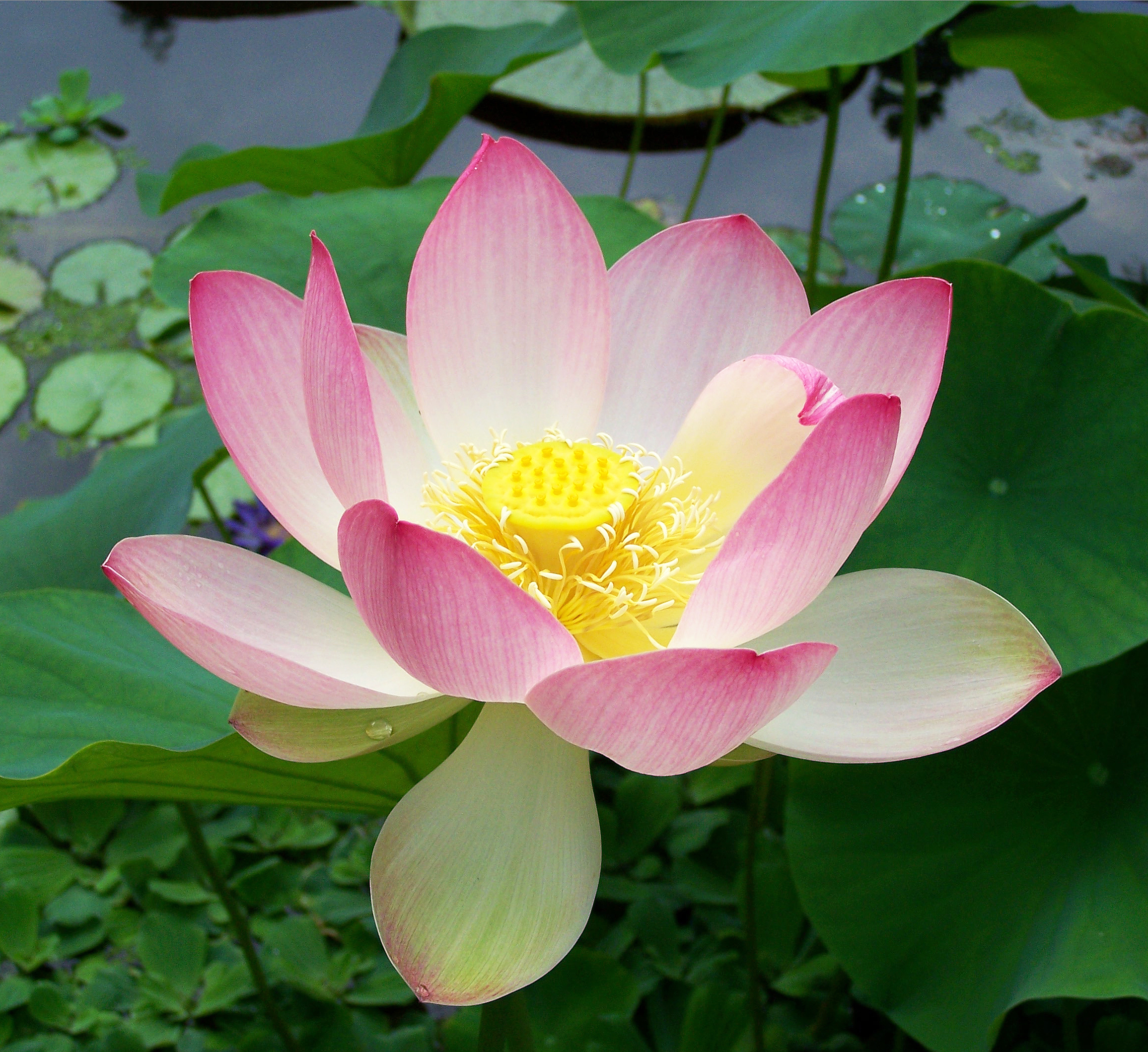
Macau lotus

The lotus is the symbol of Macau. It appeared on the flag of Macau following the 1999 handover.

=== Hong Kong orchid ===
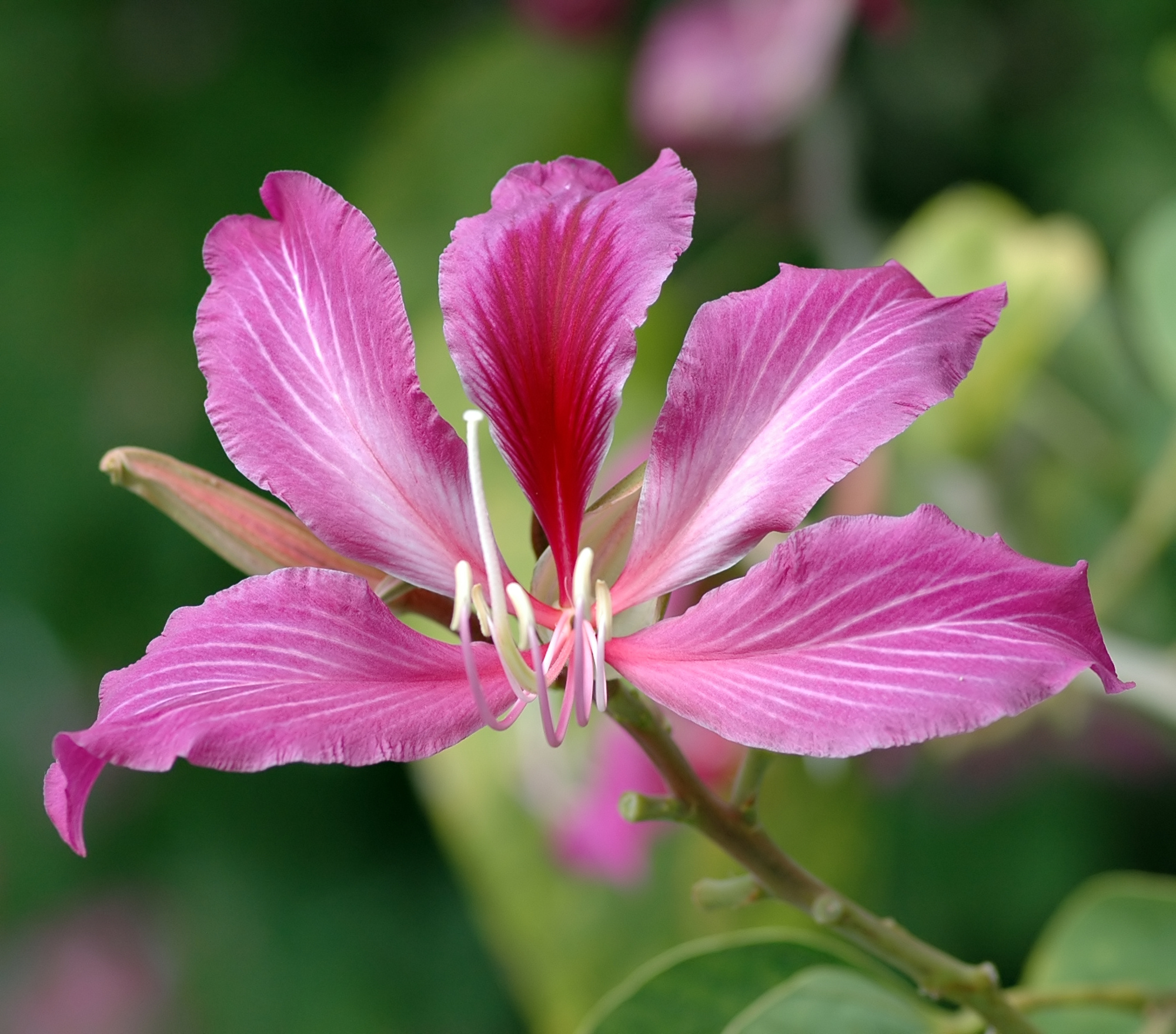
Hong Kong orchid

The Hong Kong orchid is arguably the symbol of Hong Kong. It was discovered in 1880, and was identified as a new species in 1908. It became Hong Kong's official symbol in 1965 and appeared on the flag of Hong Kong following the 1997 handover. Since Hong Kong produced a large number of films, pop songs, and soap operas to promote Cantonese culture, Hong Kong, and by extension the Hong Kong orchid, is widely held to be the symbol of modern Cantonese culture.

The Golden Bauhinia Square has a giant statue of the Hong Kong orchid and is one of the major landmarks of Hong Kong.

=== Sampan ===
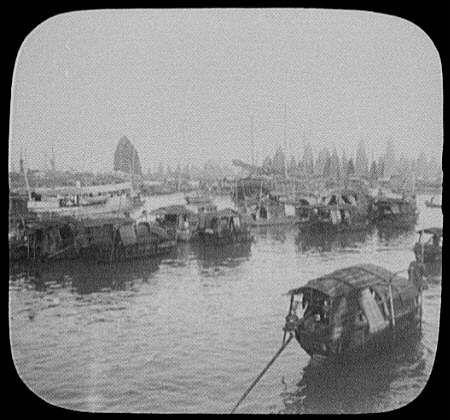
Guangzhou's sampan-filled harbour

The sampan is a type of flat-bottom boat frequently seen in the shores of the South China Sea, used by Cantonese, Hoklo, and many other Southeast Asian ethnic groups. They are usually three to four meters in length and have small shelters on board. This makes it possible for fishermen to live on their own sampans. In the major Cantonese cities of Guangzhou, Hong Kong, and Macau, it is a common sight to see crowds of sampans docked at their harbours. Thus, the image of the sampan-filled harbour is strongly associated with Lingnan. Sampans also regularly show up in films and music videos made by Cantonese.

== See also ==
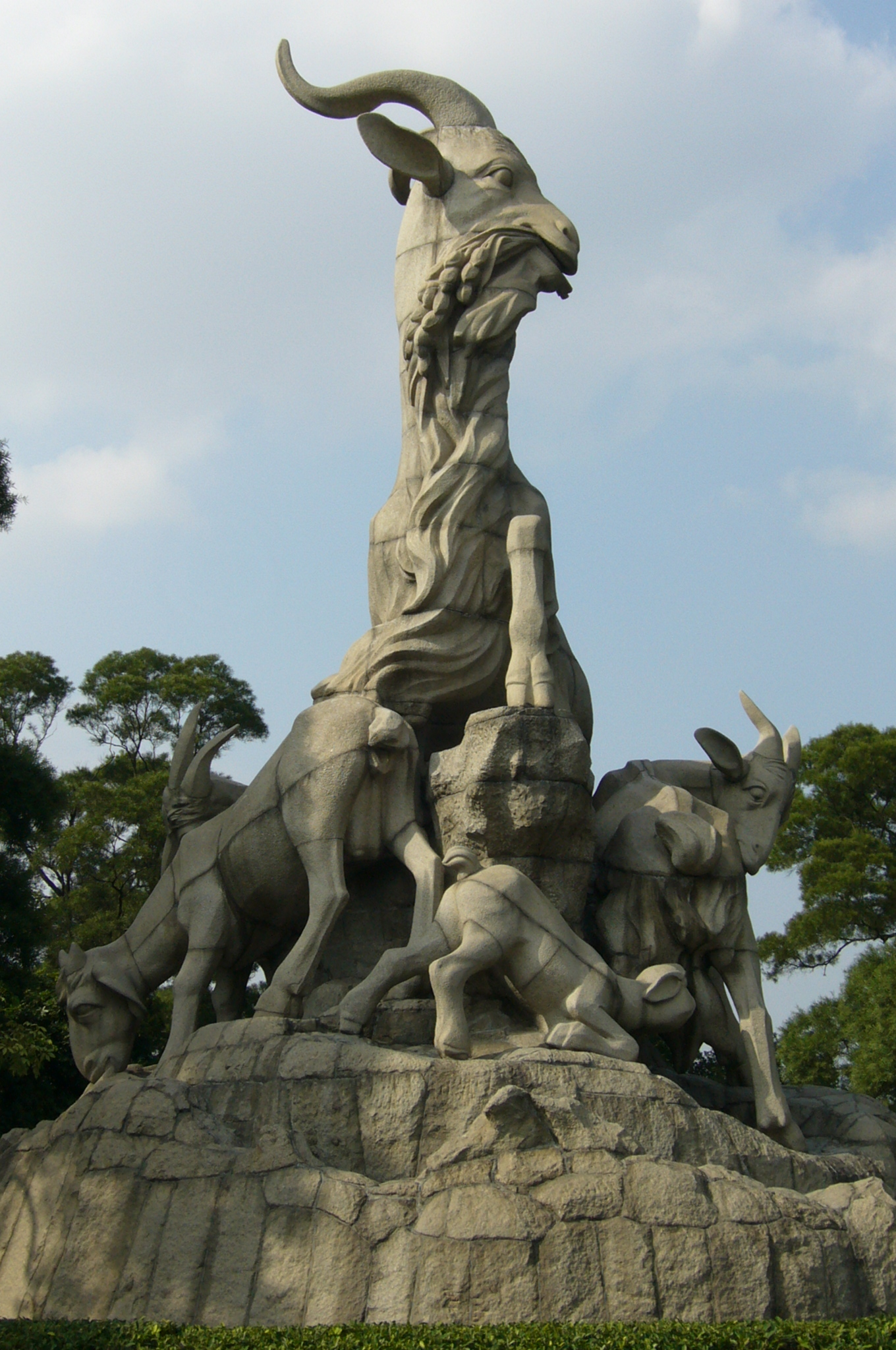
According to legend, the area around today's Guangzhou was blessed by the gods to have a rich harvest. The gods were said to have left five goats behind when they went back to heaven. Now, Guangzhou has the nickname "City of the Goats".

- The Legend of Five Goats, a legend about how Guangzhou, the cultural capital of Cantonese, originated.
- Cantonese folktales
- Eight Sights of Guangzhou
- Cantonese Wikipedia
- CCTV Nanhai Studio

=== Cantonese customs ===
- Bone collecting
- Cantonese pre-wedding customs
- Traditional Chinese marriage
- Villain hitting

=== Related cultures ===
- Chinese culture
  - Lingnan culture:
    - Culture of Hong Kong
    - Culture of Macau
  - Ba–Shu culture
  - Wuyue culture
  - Hakka culture
  - Teochew culture
  - Hokkien culture
  - Taishanese culture

=== Others ===
- Liangguang ("Leunggwong" in Cantonese), the collective term for Guangdong and Guangxi.
- Lingnan
- Stone dogs in the Leizhou Peninsula
