= Nian Li =

Traditional Chinese festival

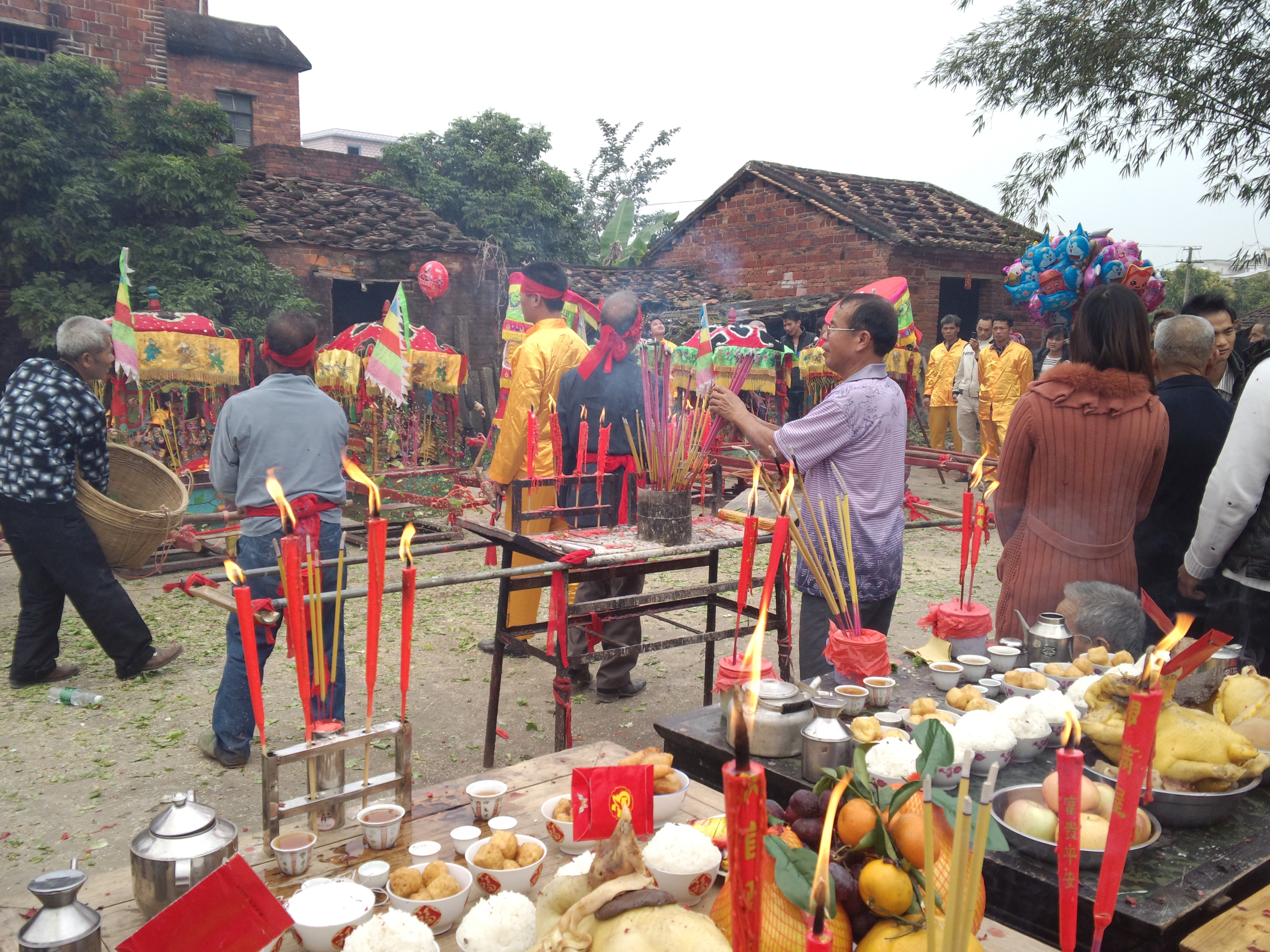
Nian Li worship activities in Huangzhushan Village, Maoming, Guangdong province

Nian Li (in mandarin, “Nin Lai" in Cantonese, Chinese: 年例; pinyin: nián lì; Jyutping: nin4 lai6) is a unique traditional festival in the west of Guangdong Province, China. "Nian" means a year in Mandarin Chinese, while “Li” means a routine. The combination of these two words means a routine of a year. Thus, people celebrate Nian Li once a year.

Among various traditional festivals in China, Lunar New Year must be the most bustling one. However, in areas of the west of Guangdong province and the south of the Five Ridges, Nian Li seems more important to local people. It is a festival full of folk cultural custom and local color. It is so busy that the road is virtually paralyzed by traffic at about 5 or 6 o’clock, the peak time---even traffic police must show up to conduct the traffic.

Nian Li promote the economic development of the west of Guangdong Province. During Nian Li period, one of the traditional activities, a grand banquet, rises the price of meat, vegetable and fruit apparently. Moreover, for better welcoming Nian Li, villagers also construct the infrastructures, like repairing roads and building bridges; they buy kinds of furniture and electrical appliancesand decorate their houses; troupes perform for the ceremonies of Nian Li; peddlers set temporary stalls in villages. All these well promote the local economy.

== Introduction ==
Nian Li is also called Nian Xiao (Chinese: 年宵 ), in some places, but differing from the traditional festival Nian Xiao in China, it is a local festival celebrated in villages of Wuchuan, Guangdong, Zhanjiang and neighboring Dianbai District, Huazhou, Guangdong, Xinyi, Guangdong, Gaozhou, Guangdong, Maonan District, Mao Guang, Yangchun of Maoming, Guangdong province.

Nian Li located in
The west of Guangdong province(the west among four parts)
#	Name	Hanzi
1	Maonan District	茂南区
2	Dianbai District	电白区
3	Huazhou City	化州市
4	Xinyi City	信宜市
5	Gaozhou City	高州市
6	Maogang City	茂港
7	Yangchun City	阳春
8	Wuchuan, Guangdong	吴川

The dates of Nian Li differ from place to place, centering in lunar January and February. A few others are in autumn (about a month after autumn harvest). In some places, several neighboring villages may have their Nian Li in the same date since they worship the same local land Gods (usually, in rural area, a temple is enshrined and worshipped by several villages around. And they celebrate their Nian Li together). Generally, a village celebrates one-day Nian Li, some few villages two days. And some villages will hold this festival twice (one is called big Nian Li, and the other small Nian Li, depending on the number of guests attended).

Nian Li is a local way to celebrate Chinese New Year in the west of Guangdong province. Ancient people regarded the growth cycle of grain as a year. From 《说文。禾部》,“a year ends when the grain gets ripe”. Prior to Tang dynasty, aborigines in the western part of what is now Guangdong province did not have the custom of celebrating the Spring Festival. Instead, they had a traditional harvest festival. That is, when the grain got ripe, they feted to celebrate good harvest and pray for good weather for the crops. In the 163rd volume of 《太平寰宇记》in Song dynasty, the custom of Xin Yi was described as, “谷熟时里閈同取，戌日为腊，男女盛服，推髻徒跣，聚会作歌”. It means that the last day of a year is the day when grain gets ripe. On that day, boys and girls dress themselves and have a party, dancing, singing and making poems. This is the earliest description about Nian Li.

In the late Qing dynasty, many counties’ documents recorded this kind of activities as a custom, showing its developing tendency at that time.

Recent years, with its unique local color and tradition, Nian Li has attracted more people's attention including people at home and abroad, and even some experts in folklore.

== The Process of Nian Li ==
In general, Nian Li is organized by the village committee with the money mainly collecting money from villages. Every family funds according to the number of their family members. Similar to the Spring Festival, when the Nian Li comes, most people will come back to their villages to hold their Nian Li. Generally, Nian Li has three parts—Worship, Feast, and Parade.

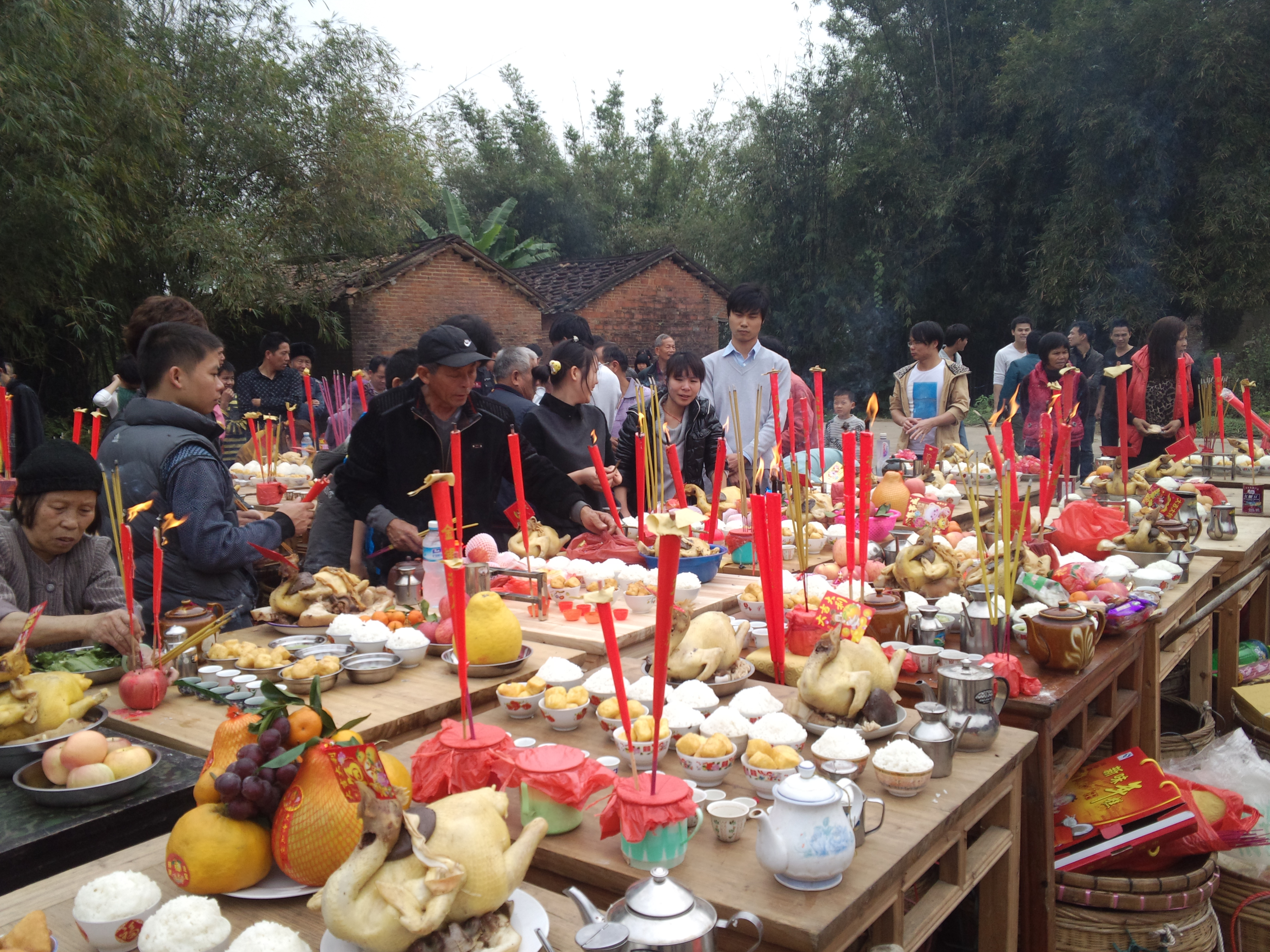
Nian Li worship of local land Gods in Huangzhushan village, Huazhou Maoming

=== Worship ===
People worship their ancestors and local land Gods in Nian Li, praying for their families' health and a good weather for grain. In that day's morning, people get up early to prepare the sacrificial offerings, including chicken, pork, incense, liquor, some snacks and so no. With these sacrificial offerings, they worship their ancestors and local land gods respectively. Then, in the evening, they unite and worship the local gods again, which are called “摆醮”.

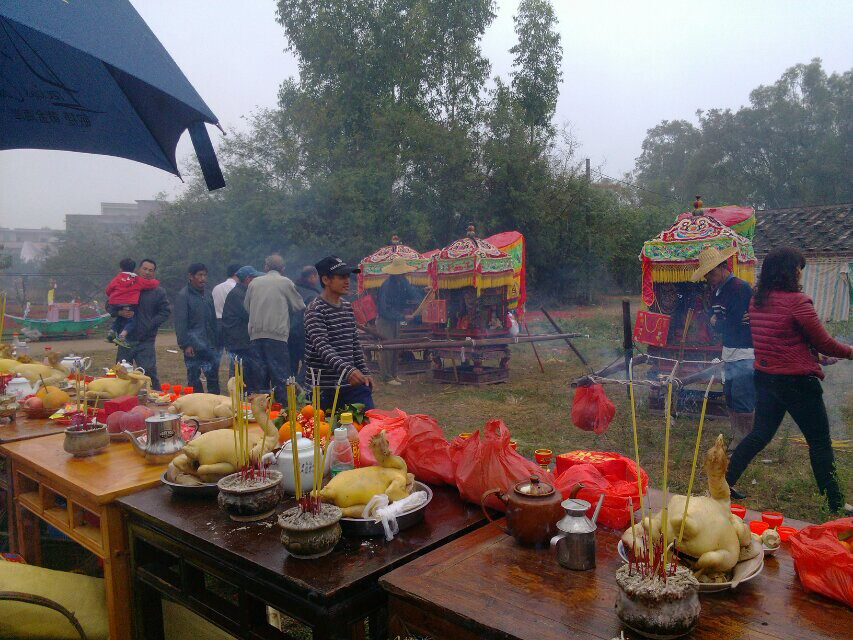
Nian Li 摆醮 in Shangpo village, Huazhou, Maoming

=== Feast ===
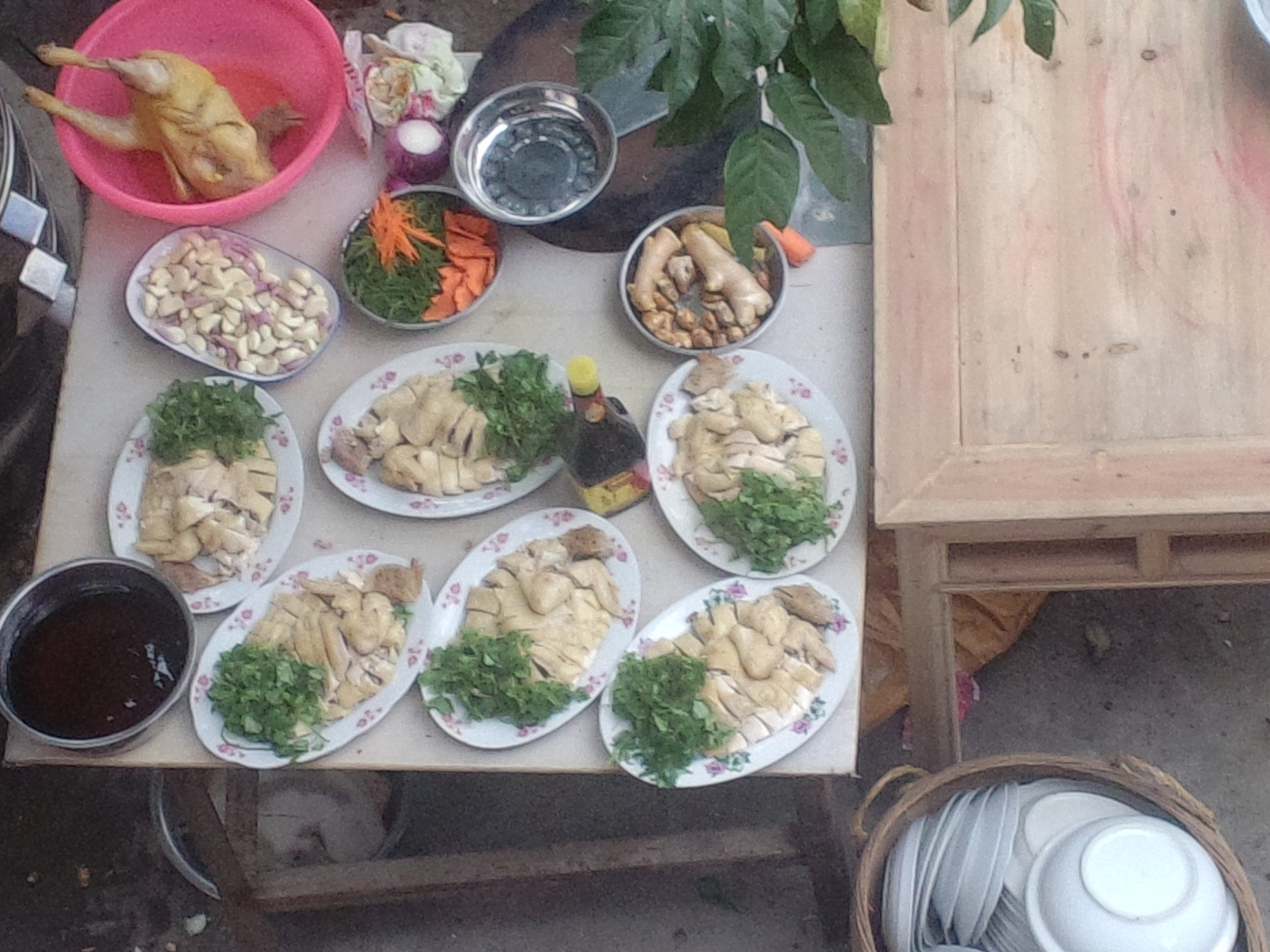
People are preparing the feast for Nian Li

The feast is the highlight of Nian Li. It is usually held in the afternoon. On that day, people invite all their friends and relatives to the feast. A variety of at least 10 dishes including meats, vegetables, soups, and desserts may be prepared, often meant to showcase wealth. Notably, attendees can eat freely in any family during Nian Li, allowing some guests to visit many feasts, getting free food for upwards of a month.

=== Parade ===
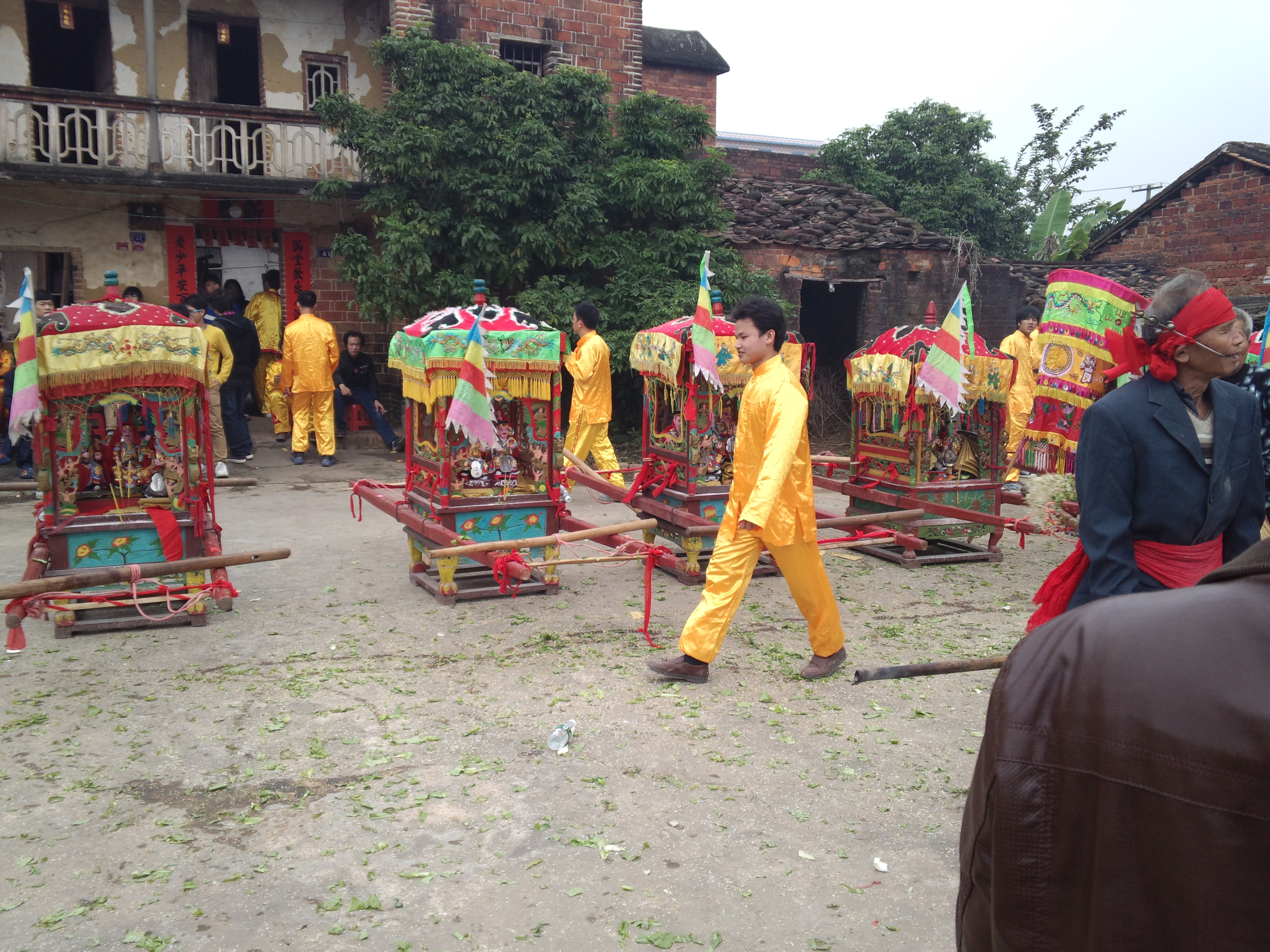
The parade of local land Gods in Huangzhushan village, Huazhou, Maoming

After the feast, the parade of gods starts. Villagers and guests stand beside the road to watch the parade. Some young and strong villagers go to the temple and hold a rite to invite the gods. Then, they shoulder the gods' sculptures to parade. Except for the presenting of gods, the parade also includes Lion dance,

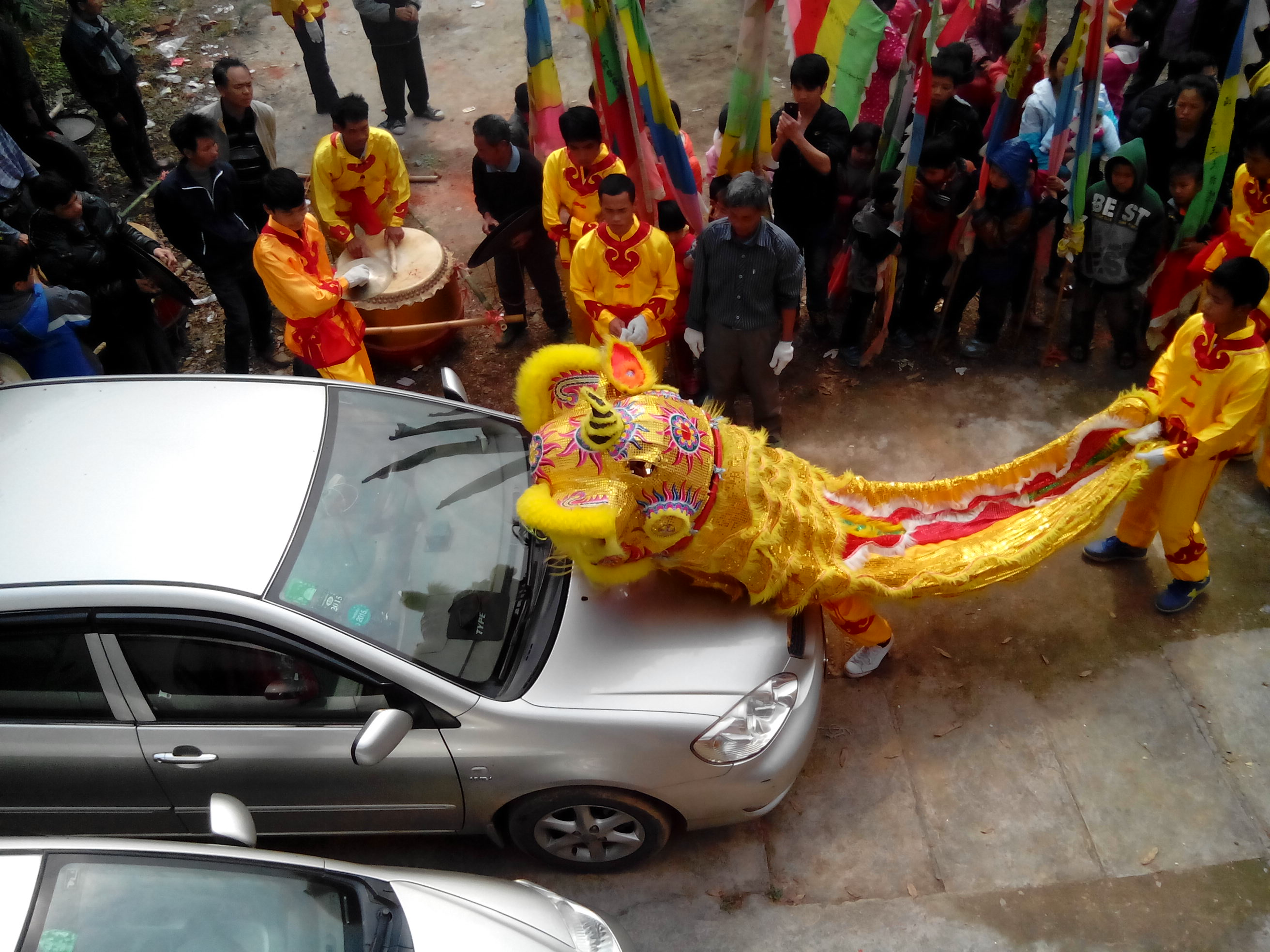
Lion dance in Nian Li in Huazhou, Maoming

which is very popular in Guangdong province.

After the parade, the gods are sent back to the temple. Then, the “摆醮” starts.

=== Other activities ===
- Temporary stalls Many peddlers will set various temporary stalls on sides of the road. Visitors can buy many local appetizers there. There are also some stalls providing toys, and some have games to play.
- Troupes Usually, the village will invite troupes to give performance. They also have some local plays like Shadow play and Cantonese opera. These activities start after finishing “摆醮”.
- Fireworks The money collected from villagers is not only used in parade and troupes, but also used in the fireworks. The firework show usually happens at 22:00 to 23:00. Even though it is a little late, many people from other villages will come to watch it.

== History ==
According to the 163rd volume of 《太平寰宇记》, Nian Li originated from Song dynasty and became popular in Ming dynasty. Until Qing dynasty, it reached its peak. Because of its unique custom activities, Nian Li were recorded by various of county documents. Nowadays, these records become important evidence for the study of Nian Li.

- County annals of Xinyi, Guangdong in Qing dynasty recorded, “元宵，城市家悬彩灯，亲朋聚赏萧鼓，歌讴之声达旦。多于是月乡傩，名曰年例”. It described the activities of Nian Li such as inviting friends and relatives to the feast.
- County annals of Maoming recorded, “二月(February)祭社，分肉入社，后田功毕作，自十二月至于是月，乡人傩，沿门逐鬼，唱土歌，谓之年例”. Here, it introduced the time of Nian Li and some traditional activities like worship.

Nian Li did not disappear when other fetes, celebrating new year, were forbidden in the early People's Republic of China. It continued to prevail with its own unique customs. After Chinese Civil War, it was stopped once, then recovered gradually until the 1980s. Nowadays, this festival still prevails over the west of Guangdong province

== Origins ==
There are many versions of Nian Li's origins, but none of them is exactly certain.

1. It is said that Nian Li derived from Lunar New Year Fair. After Han and Tang dynasty, inhabitants in the west of Guangdong province stated to absorb the custom of Spring Festival and Lunar New Year Fair from Central Plain (China). And gradually, they turned it into Nian Li after combining with the local custom of celebrating the good harvest.
2. It is actually a date to memorize the days when the ancestors of the west of Guangdong province migrated to the places they are living in now.
3. It is said to have some relationship with Lady Xian, a heroine in Chinese history. For memorizing her, Xian family held an annual sacrificial practice at the end of a year. The celebration of Nian Li started from Xian family's sacrificial practices and developed to the Nian Li today through a long term evolution.
