= Shenzhen–Zhanjiang high-speed railway =

Railway line in Guangdong, China

Shenzhen–Zhanjiang railway
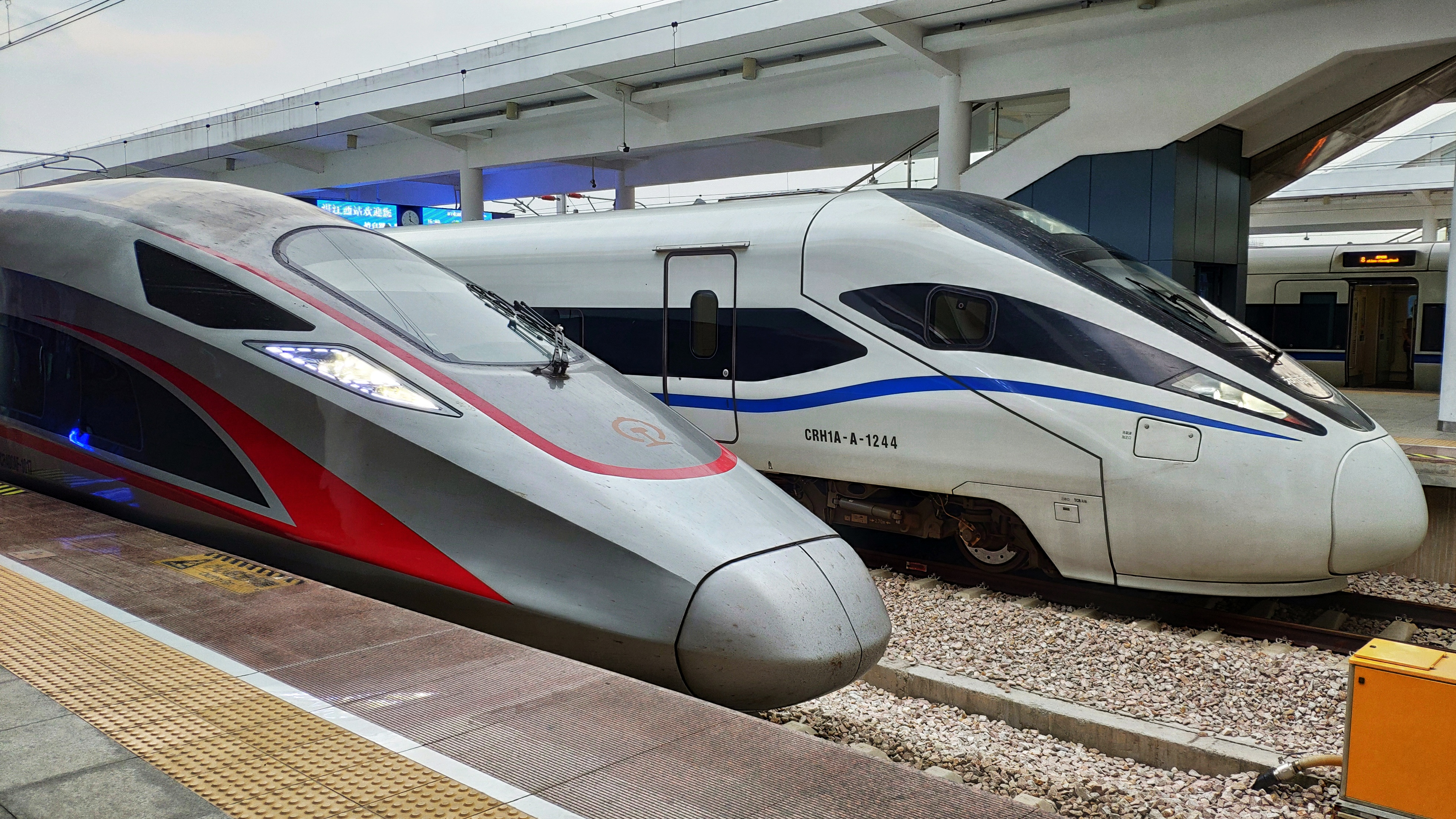
- Shenzhen–Zhanjiang railway

Overview
- Native name: 深湛铁路
- Status: In operation
- Owner: CR Guangzhou
- Locale: Guangdong province: Shenzhen, Dongguan, Guangzhou, Zhongshan, Jiangmen, Yangjiang, Maoming, Zhanjiang
- Termini: Xili; Zhanjiangxi (zh)
- Stations: 23

Service
- Type: High-speed rail
- System: China Railway High-speed
- Operator(s): CR Guangzhou

History
- Opened: 28 December 2013; 11 years ago (Maoming–Zhanjiang section); 1 July 2018; 7 years ago (Jiangmen–Maoming section)

Technical
- Line length: 387 km (240 mi)
- Track gauge: 1,435 mm (4 ft 8 1/2 in) standard gauge
- Electrification: 25 kV 50 Hz AC (Overhead line)
- Operating speed: 250 km/h (155 mph)

Shenzhen–Zhanjiang railway
- Simplified Chinese: 深湛铁路
- Traditional Chinese: 深湛鐵路
Transcriptions
Standard Mandarin
- Hanyu Pinyin: Shēnzhàn Tiělù
- IPA: [ʂə́n.ʈʂân tʰjè.lû]
Yue: Cantonese
- Jyutping: sam^{1}zaam^{3} tit^{3}lou^{6}
- IPA: [sɐm˥.tsam˧ tʰit̚˧.lɔw˨]

The Shenzhen–Zhanjiang railway is a high-speed railway across the south of Guangdong province. Currently it runs from Shenzhen to Zhanjiang West. It links the cities of Shenzhen and Zhanjiang.

== History ==
Announced as part of the 12th Five Year Plan for 2011–2016, it was projected that construction of this railway would begin. Tenders were called for early in 2013 with construction to begin before the end of that year. Construction officially began on 28 June 2014. The Jiangmen–Maoming section opened on 1 July 2018.

Construction of Shenzhen to Jiangmen section started on 9 October 2022. On 4 December, a section of the railway under construction in Shenzhen collapsed following a cave-in, leaving 13 workers missing.

== Route ==
The railway follows a 387 km (240 mi) route from Xili railway station to Maoming East railway station. The existing Xinhui branch of the Guangzhou–Zhuhai intercity railway is included as a central link, with 265 km (165 mi) of new trackage extending west to Maoming and then a new tunnel across the Pearl River Delta from Shenzhen south of the Humen Pearl River Bridge.

Starting at Xili railway station, the railway travels through a tunnel to Shenzhen Airport East railway station at Shenzhen Bao'an International Airport. It then crosses through a tunnel underneath the Pearl River before reaching Xiaolan, Guzhen, Waihai, Jiangmen South, Shuangshuizhen, Taishan, Kaiping, Enping, Dahuai, Heshan, Yangjiang, Yangxi, Mata, Guanzhu, Dianbai and Maoming East.

Station Name	Chinese	Metro transfers/connections	Location
Xili		13 (U/C)	
Shenzhen Airport East		1 (via Airport East)	
Dongguan Binhaiwan			
Nansha		18 (via Wanqingsha)	
Zhongshan North			
Henglan			
Jiangmen
Shuangshuizhen
Taishan
Kaiping South
Enping
Yangdong
Yangjiang
Yangxi
Mata
Dianbai
Maoming East
Maoming
Wuchuan
Zhanjiang West

== Construction ==
The Maoming–Zhanjiang section was constructed between 2009 and 2013. The project was funded jointly by the, now defunct, Ministry of Railways and the Guangdong Provincial Government. Construction commenced on 21 March 2009 and was opened to traffic on 28 December 2013. Although officially opened on 28 December 2013, no high-speed trains started using it at the time.

Construction of the 387-kilometre (240 mi) Shenzhen–Maoming railway was carried out in two sections: the Jiangmen–Maoming section and the Shenzhen–Jiangmen section. Construction of the section from Jiangmen to Maoming started in June 2014 and was opened on 1 July 2018. From this point on, thru high-speed service started along the Guangzhou–Jiangmen–Maoming–Zhanjiang route.

A special feature of the Jiangmen–Maoming section is a 2,036-metre (6,680 ft) steel tunnel protecting the Birds' Paradise from the noise of the high-speed railway line. The noise barrier reduces the noise of the train to about 50 dB SPL at the bird park, which is only 800 metres (2,625 ft) away from the high-speed railway line. The section from Shenzhen to Jiangmen was delayed due to the complicated geographic condition of the mouth of the Pearl River and the large budget, 65.2 billion yuan (US$9.88 billion).

The construction plan of China Railway Guangzhou Group Corp. shows the Shenzhen-Jiangmen section costs 51.3 billion yuan (US$7.27 billion); the project starts from Xili railway station in Nanshan District of Shenzhen, and passes through Bao'an District of Shenzhen and Dongguan, Zhongshan to end in Jiangmen. It has seven stations: Xili, Shenzhen Airport East, Dongguan Binhaiwan, Nansha, Zhongshan North, Henglan and Jiangmen. Simultaneously, a 20.4-kilometer rail line will be built to link Shenzhen Airport East railway station with Shenzhen North railway station, and a 12.6-kilometer connecting line will be built in Jiangmen and Zhongshan.

Upon completion of the Shenzhen-Jiangmen section in 2028, the trip from Qianhai to Nansha will be cut to 30 minutes and the trip between Shenzhen and Maoming will be cut to three hours. Once the Shenzhen-Jiangmen section is operational, passengers change to the Ganzhou-Shenzhen high-speed railway at Xili railway station and to the Hangzhou-Shenzhen high-speed railway and the Guangzhou-Shenzhen-Hong Kong high-speed railway at Shenzhen North railway station. At Shenzhen Airport East railway station, the railway will offer transfers to Second Guangzhou–Shenzhen high-speed railway, which is currently under planning, and at Zhongshan railway station, it will be connected with Guangzhou-Zhuhai intercity railway.

Construction of Shenzhen to Jiangmen section started on 9 October 2022. The section is 116 km in length with 7 stations.
