= Maoming railway station =

Railway station in Maoming, Guangdong

Maoming 茂名
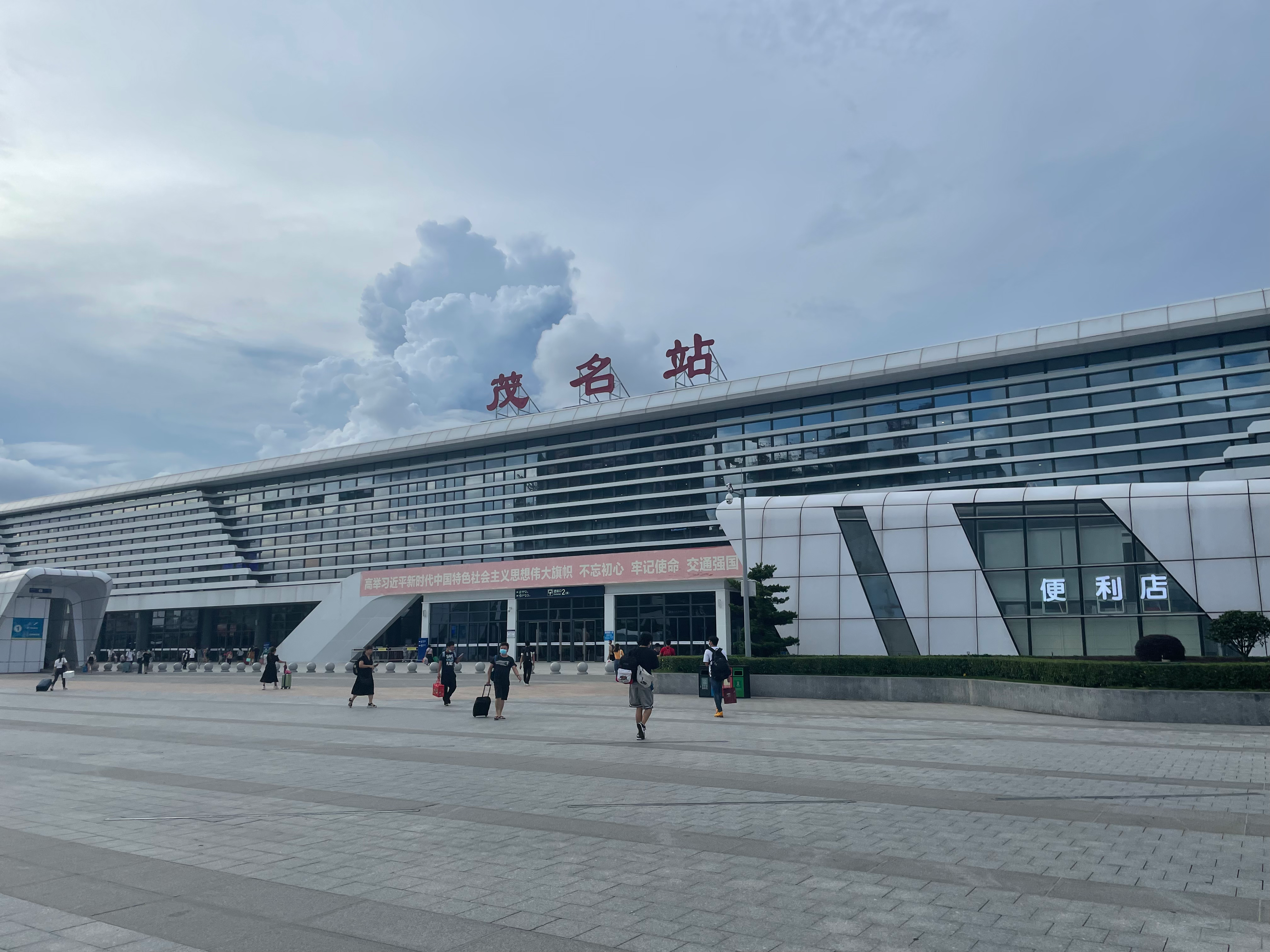
- Exterior of the station in 2021

General information
- Location: Maonan District, Maoming, Guangdong; China
- Lines: Guangzhou–Maoming railway; Luoyang–Zhanjiang railway; Hechun–Maoming railway; Shenzhen–Zhanjiang high-speed railway (partially complete)

History
- Opened: 3 May 1991
Location

Maoming railway station (Chinese: 茂名站) is a railway station in Maonan District, Maoming, Guangdong, China.

== History ==
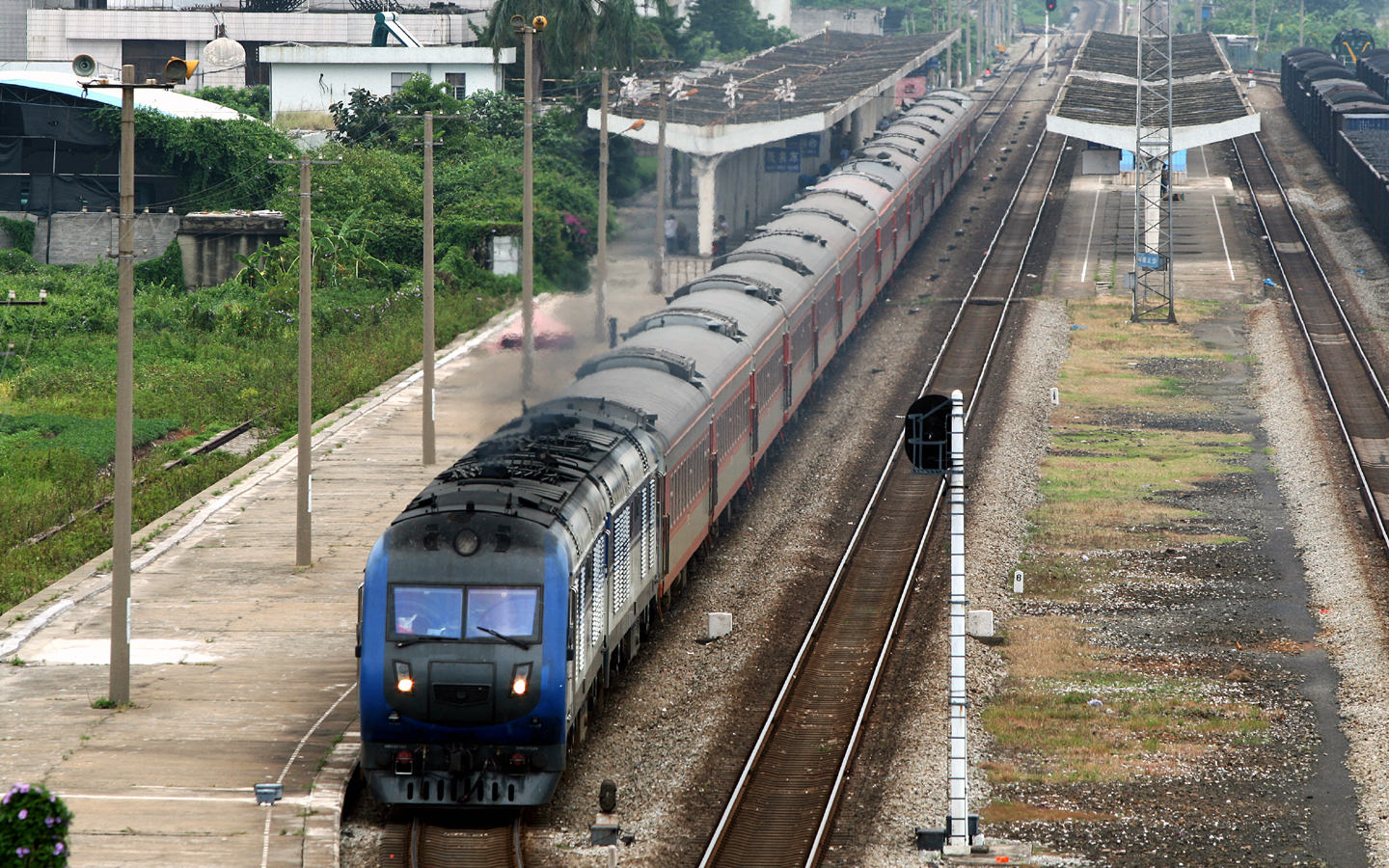
The station in 2011

The station was opened on 3 May 1991 along with the final section of the Guangzhou–Maoming railway.

The name of this station was changed from Maoming East to Maoming on 10 September 2016. Another station, previously called Maoming, was renamed Maoming West railway station at the same time.

On 21 October 2019, a new station building south of the railway was opened, while the old station building situated north of the line was closed. The north station building was subsequently demolished and a new building was opened on 8 January 2022.
