= Luo Yinguo =

Chinese politician (1954–2016)

Luo Yinguo (Chinese: 罗荫国; April 1954 – 22 July 2016) was a Chinese politician, mostly known for his tenure as the Communist Party Secretary of Maoming, a city in Guangdong province, between 2007 and 2011. He was convicted of corruption and received a death sentence with reprieve in July 2013, although he died of cancer while in prison in July 2016.

== Biography ==
Luo was born in Gaozhou, Guangdong province, considered part of the municipal region of Maoming. Luo first worked as an elementary school teacher, then worked as part of a rural commune in his home county. In 1990 he was named county governor of Gaozhou. When the county earned "city" status in 1993, Luo became its first Mayor, and a year later became Communist Party Secretary of Gaozhou. In 1998 he became the Secretary-General of the Maoming Party Committee, and in 2001, became deputy Party Secretary of Maoming. Between 2003 and 2007 Luo served as Mayor of Maoming, then he was promoted to Party Secretary.

On February 11, 2011, Luo was arrested by prosecution authorities to face corruption-related charges. Maoming had been on the radar of provincial disciplinary authorities beginning in 2009, as the city was believed to be the site of widespread buying and selling of official posts. Since 2009, hundreds of officials in the city had been investigated or charged. It was suspected that Luo's "corrupt earnings" totaled over 100 million yuan (~$16 million). In July 2013, Luo was convicted of bribery and "amassing wealth of unclear origin," and was sentenced to death with a two-year reprieve.

Regarding his arrest, Luo was widely reported to have said, "you say I am a corrupt official? Who at my level is not a corrupt official? Why are you coming after me? If you truly had the guts, ask me who in Maoming is corrupt, I can spend three days and three nights telling you! Isn't China just corrupt officials promoting other corrupt officials, corrupt officials combating corruption?"

While in prison, Luo worked a day job putting together light bulbs. He told television reporters that he had somehow managed to increase the efficiency of lightbulb production from 1,000 to 4,000 per day. In an interview with Xinkuaibao, a local newspaper, Luo denied allegations that he was a luoguan. He said he missed his wife, who was also in prison, and that the two could only communicate by letter once every two or three months. He also said that some of his prison mates still addressed him "Mr. Secretary," while others called him "old Luo".

Other Party Secretaries of Maoming, Zhou Zhenhong and Liang Yimin, were also investigated for corruption in 2012 and 2014, respectively.

Luo died of cancer while in prison on 22 July 2016.

Party political offices
Previous: Zhou Zhenhong	Communist Party Secretary of Maoming; 2007–2011	Next: Deng Haiguang (邓海光)
