= Chicken Island =

Chicken Island may refer to:

- Chicken Island (Guangdong)
- Chicken Island (Tasmania)
