= Temple of Madam Xian =

Temple in China

The Temple of Madam Xian (Chinese: 冼太庙) is a temple commemorating Lady Xian, located at Wenming Street, near the Eastern Gate of Gaozhou, Guangdong province, China. Madam Xian is revered as a symbol of unity and safety.

== Lady Xian ==
Lady Xian was a prominent 6th-century military leader of the Baiyue people in the Lingnan region. She successively served three Chinese dynasties, namely the Liang, Chen, and Sui. She was granted the title Lady Kangjun by the Liang, Lady Shilong by the Chen, and Lady Qiaoguo by the Sui dynasty. Chinese Premier Zhou Enlai called her "The First Heroine of China" (中国巾帼第一人). Local residents called her the "Saintly Mother of Lingnan" (岭南圣母). Approximately 300 temples of Lady Xian are found in Maoming. The one at Wenming Street is one of the largest.

== History and development ==
At the beginning of the Ming dynasty, the temple moved to its present location when the old Gaozhou County moved to the south where the current Gaozhou County is located. During the Ming dynasty, in 1535, the temple was rebuilt at Wenming Street at the Eastern Gate of Gaozhou County.

During the Qing dynasty, the temple was restored several times.

After the Chinese Civil War ended, the temple was converted for use as a kindergarten. This damaged the original temple.

During the 1980s, donors from various fields gave money for renovation.

In December 1990, the Cultural Relic's Management Committee of Guangdong Province sanctioned another renovation. The renovation started in August 1992, and was completed in December 1994.

In 2002, after Chinese Communist Party general secretary Jiang Zemin visited, he declared that the scale was not large enough and needed to be developed as the base of patriotism education. In response, the Gaozhou government expanded it and converted it for use in patriotism education.

In 2007, the People's Government of Guangdong Province awarded it the provincial unit of cultural relic protection.

In 2014, the Temple of Madam Xian was rated as a base of China's culture.

== Layout ==
Its length is about 62.2 meters. The width is 13.2 meters, covering 826.3 square meters. Four pavilions extend from the longitudinal axis: a front hall, nave, main hall and back hall.

In the front hall, hung on the right and left walls, are paintings attributed to painters such as Yang Qiuxi. Peddlers sell incense, candles and souvenirs to pilgrims.

Between the front hall and the nave is a large patio with a stone boat, around which moss grows.

The nave hosts a horizontal board stating "Temple of Madam Xian", scribed by Zhao Puchu. Hanging above in the middle of the nave is a large screen entitled "Birds paying homage to the phoenix". On the left and right walls are twelve pieces of vivid fresco. One of the frescoes depicts a picture of a shepherd boy playing with cattle. Below the frescoes are 10 pieces of stone inscriptions recording the feats of Madam Xian.

In the main hall are three statues of Madam Xian of different sizes. The biggest statue wears a phoenix coronet, flowery shoes and colorful clothes and is located in the north of the main hall. Two statues of her bodyguards are named Mulan and Cao'e. It is said that Mulan was in command of Madam Xian's sword, and Cao'e preserved her seal. This statue can be operated by pressing buttons. It can stand up, sit down and stretch out its arms so that the staff can change its clothes. Another statue depicts Madam Xian sitting in a spectacular chair between the biggest and smallest statues. The last and smallest statue is designed for parade because it is much easier to carry.

The back hall is the Temple of Feng Bao, the husband of Madam Xian. The statues of Madam Xian and Feng Bao are both placed there. Both of them are regarded as Gods of Hehe, the symbol of affectionate couples. Young couples pray in front of the two statues when they encounter relationship difficulties.

== Aesthetic value ==
In addition to its red walls and green roof, craftsmen employed colored drawing, paste-on-paste decoration and carving to adorn it.

Almost all the colored drawings, most of which are about folktales, are frescoes. Each has its own theme. The frescoes in the eaves and walls of the nave were created in Ming or Qing dynasty, giving them historic as well as aesthetic value.

Paste-on-paste decoration is mostly used as the cresting of the roof. The crests are "double dragons plays with a ball", "two carps jump across Longmen", and "tales of Madam Xian" and reflect the traditional custom and distinctive culture.

The two types of carvings are stone and wood carvings. Stone carvings are mainly used to dot the stone pillars, while wood carvings are employed to make statues or wooden screens. Both embody the traditional arts of China.

Multiple examples of calligraphy and paintings offer high aesthetic value.

== Significance ==
Ding Yangzhong, professor of Central Drama Academy in Beijing, wrote a couplet for Temple of Madam Xian: 是人非神，千秋景仰；亦人亦神，万代馨香. In other words, Madam Xian was a human being, but what she did was beyond an ordinary human's ability. Because Madam Xian was a woman with extraordinary merit, people revere her, although they do not deify her.
