= Xu Shaohua =

Xu Shaohua may refer to:

- Xu Shaohua (politician) (born 1958), politician of the People's Republic of China, Vice-Governor of Guangdong
- Xu Shaohua (actor) (born 1958), Chinese television actor
