= Fahsien =

Fahsien can refer to:

- Fahsien, a historic Chinese Buddhist monk
- Fahsien, a historic Chinese county which is now the Huadu District of Guangzhou City, Guangdong Province, China
- Fahsien, the alternative name of a historic Chinese county which is now Huazhou City, Guangdong Province, China
