= Daqiao, Maoming =

Daqiao 笪桥镇
- Town
- Location in Guangdong
- Coordinates: 21°34′02″N 110°29′14″E
- Country: People's Republic of China
- Province: Guangdong
- Prefecture-level city: Maoming
- County-level city: Huazhou
- Elevation: 30 m (98 ft)
- Time zone: UTC+8 (China Standard)
- Area code: 0668

Daqiao (simplified Chinese: 笪桥; traditional Chinese: 笪橋; pinyin: Dáqiáo; Jyutping: daat^{3}kiu^{4}) is a town of in southwestern Guangdong province, China, located along China National Highway 207 and 19 kilometres (12 mi) (as the crow flies) from downtown Huazhou, which administers it. As of 2018, it has one residential community (社区) and 13 villages under its administration.

== See also ==
- List of township-level divisions of Guangdong
