= Boyang =

Boyang Town 播扬镇
- Town
- Location in Guangdong
- Coordinates: 22°06′58″N 110°35′27″E
- Country: People's Republic of China
- Province: Guangdong
- Prefecture-level city: Maoming
- County-level city: Huazhou
- Time zone: UTC+8 (China Standard)
- Postal code: 525100
- Telephone area code: (0)668

Boyang (simplified Chinese: 播扬; traditional Chinese: 播揚; pinyin: Bōyáng) is a town in southwestern Guangdong province, People's Republic of China, located near the border with Guangxi. It is under the administration of Huazhou City.
