= Chicken Island (Guangdong) =

Island in China

Native name: 放鸡岛 Nickname: Wanzhou Island, Fenzhou Island
- Location within Guangdong

Geography
- Coordinates: 21°23′N 111°11′E

Administration
- China
- Province: Guangdong
- City: Maoming

Additional information
- Time zone: China Standard (UTC+8)
- Official website: mmfjd.cn

Chicken Island
- 'Fangjidao", as written in Chinese
- Simplified Chinese: 放鸡岛
- Traditional Chinese: 放雞島
Transcriptions
Standard Mandarin
- Hanyu Pinyin: Fàngjīdǎo

Chicken Island is an island located in the southeast of Dianbai district, Maoming, Guangdong province, China. Its original name is Fenzhou (汾洲) island and Wanzhou (湾舟) island. The distance from Chicken Island to continent is 8 nautical miles. The area of Chicken Island is 1.9 square kilometers and it is the biggest island in Maoming. The highest point on Chicken island is 122 miles and the visibility of the sea area around it is between 6 and 12 miles. The climate of Chicken island is subtropical climate.

== History ==
Chicken island was located in the sea Silk Road. Over thousands of years, many ships used it to take a rest here. Chicken island has traces of the communication between ancient China and western countries.

Besides the witness of history, famous people had come to Chicken Island. Li Deyu, a politician in Tang dynasty, left a stone tablet here when he suffered a demotion in 848. He used the stone tablet to record the climbing in Chicken Island and his demotion.

In 2004, Chen Mingzhe (陈明哲) bought the rights of using Chicken Island for fifty years. He spent 4.3 billion yuan to develop the island. Chicken Island has become the AAAA degree scenic spot in China.

== Origin of the name ==
There are mainly two origins of the name which can be divided into history and myth reason.

=== History ===
One origin is about Li Deyu. He was an officer in Tang dynasty. After demoted by the court, he kept travelling and had been Chicken island. After his visit, people built a temple for him and exalted him as spirit. When ships went by, sailors would go to the temple and worship his spirit by releasing a chicken.

=== Myth ===
There are two myths about the origin of the name. Here is the first one. Long time ago, local sailors who needed to be navigated would put a chicken in this island and blessed for safety. Gradually, the name of the island became Chicken Island. In Chinese, Chicken island means the island is used to releasing chickens.

Here is the second story about the origin of this name. In the old time, sailor who came through this island, the wave was too huge that many boats had been destroyed. One day, there is a Buddhist looked at a boat team which was coming back and the boats were getting through the Wanzhou (湾舟) island. The Buddhist discovered that the billows looked like centipedes which were attacking the boats. Wanzhou (湾舟) island looked like a chicken. Therefore, he had an idea to solve the problem. He told sailors to build a temple in Wanzhou (湾舟) island and release some chickens there. These behaviors mean that they were using chicken to overcome the centipedes. After that, the sailors felt it makes sense and they kept doing it. Because releasing chicken means accumulate virtue in Chinese Buddhism. After that, the sea around Wanzhou (湾舟) island become quiet and peace. Sailors had got full tank of fishes and they felt it works. Therefore, whenever sailor go to work, they would release a chicken in Wanzhou (湾舟) island to accumulate virtue for safety. Gradually, people called it Chicken island.

== Economy ==
Chicken Island Attractions
Name	Kanji
The queen of heaven	天后宫
Chicken Scenery	鸡头风光
Wishing tree	许愿树
Gold beach	黄金海滩
Wild pineapple park	野菠萝公园

Economy in 2011
Total visitors	454,600
Visitors per day in tourism peak	5300–6300
Income	1.35 billion yuan

Chicken Island was an uninhabited island. In June 2004, Chen Mingzhe (陈明哲), a Taiwanese attained fifty years use right of Chicken Island. After two years, they built up a wharf which depth is between 30 and 40 miles and width is 5 miles, a road which length is 9 kilometers which surrounds the island and completed the water system, hydro system and network system. He also develop Chicken Island into a tourist attraction. The table above is the tourist economy of Chicken island in 2011.

== Tourist Attractions ==
=== The queen of heaven ===
The queen of heaven is located in the middle northern of Chicken island. The main building is a Chinese temple and it was built in February. In this attraction, it contains the queen of heaven(Huangji Palace), Nine Dragon Pool, Mercy room, Shun dhi pavilion, Nine-Dragon Wall, Mazu (goddess) culture wall, Bell Tower and vice versa. These are architectural attractions. Standing on square in this attraction, people can see all of the constructions. The queen of heaven is in the top of the attraction.

=== Chicken scenery ===
The second name for Chicken scenery is Chicken head scene. Chicken scenery is located in the northern of Chicken island. This area has been kept washing by the waves and formed the coastal erosion land shape. Therefore, rocks in here have different and strange shapes. There are some nature landscapes like the reef and different stones such as chicken head stone, kissing stone, lion stone and golden turtle. The name of these stones is created by metaphor. Chicken scenery is a suitable place for rock fishing.

=== Wishing tree ===
Wishing tree is located in the west of Chicken island. In this attraction, a banyan which is over one hundred years old has many roots on the rock wall. Wish cards hanging on the tree branches. In front of the banyan, a statue placed here. The statue has a myth. Long time ago, a fisher hit by storm and swam back to Chicken island. He saw Ji Gong reclining under the tree. Instead of answering the fisher's request, Jigong waved his hand fan and disappeared. When the fisher awoke, he found his ship was full of fishes and he saw Ji Gong sculptor is under the tree. After that, people hang wish cards on the tree and pray to Jigong.

=== Gold beach ===
Gold beach is a scenic area with beach and amusements which is surrounded by blue sea. Gold beach is located in northeastern Chicken island. The infrastructure here includes beach bars, beach stages, and a food street near the coastline. These entertainments open at night. Along with the coastline, there is a pavilion to view the sea and sunset.

=== Wild pineapple park ===
This is a theme park that contains many wild pineapple trees and some statues. The location of this park is the south of Chicken island. There are lots of wild pineapple trees which are over hundreds year old. The academic name of these trees is Pandanus tectorius. Besides wild pineapple trees, the park has the statues of Nanhai Guanyin, Nanhai turtle, Jin Chan and Paul the Octopus and some pavilions that related to these statues. Standing in the pavilion, people could see the sea rock topography, sea trough, and sea caves. Wild pineapple park is a proper place to watch sunset and go fishing in Chicken island.

== Transportation ==
The chicken island is accessible by ship or speedboat. People need to take ship at the Bohe (博贺) dock which is located in Dianbai district. The ship from Bohe (博贺) dock can reach Chicken island dock. Inside the island, bike and electric truck are the only transportation allowed.
