= Xu Shaohua (politician) =

Chinese politician (born 1958)

- 徐少华

Vice Chairman of Guangdong People's Congress
- In office January 2017 – January 2021
- Chairperson: Li Yumei

Executive Vice-Governor of Guangdong
- In office February 2012 – January 2017
- Governor: Zhu Xiaodan→Ma Xingrui
- Party Secretary: Hu Chunhua
- Preceded by: Xiao Zhiheng
- Succeeded by: Lin Shaochun

Deputy Secretary General of Guangdong
- In office April 2008 – February 2012
- Party Secretary: Wang Yang

Communist Party Secretary of Zhanjiang
- In office August 2005 – April 2008
- Preceded by: Deng Weilong
- Succeeded by: Chen Yaoguang

Mayor of Zhanjiang
- In office 2000 – August 2005
- Preceded by: Zhou Zhenhong
- Succeeded by: Chen Yaoguang

Personal details
- Born: January 1958 (age 68) Guangzhou, Guangdong, China
- Party: Chinese Communist Party
- Education: Sun Yat-sen University

Chinese name
- Traditional Chinese: 徐少華
- Simplified Chinese: 徐少华
Transcriptions
Standard Mandarin
- Hanyu Pinyin: Xú Shàohuá
Yue: Cantonese
- Jyutping: Ceoi^{4} Siu^{2}-waa^{4}

Xu Shaohua (Chinese: 徐少华; born January 1958) is a retired Chinese politician. Previously he was executive vice governor of Guangdong province and vice chairman of Guangdong People's Congress.

== Early life and education ==
Xu was born in Guangzhou, Guangdong in January 1958. Xu entered Sun Yat-sen University in September 1979, majoring in economics, where he graduated in July 1983.

== Career ==
Xu entered the workforce in December 1974 and joined the Chinese Communist Party in March 1984.

In April 1989, Xu served as the deputy magistrate of Fengkai County, he was elevated to the magistrate position in December 1992. In October 1994, Xu was promoted to become the Chinese Communist Party Committee Secretary of Fengkai County.

In March 1996, Xu was elevated to the vice mayor of Zhaoqing.

In January 1998, Xu was transferred to Zhanjiang and appointed the vice-mayor of Zhanjiang. In 2000, Xu was promoted to become mayor of Zhanjiang. In August 2005, Xu served as Chinese Communist Party Committee Secretary of Zhanjiang.

In April 2008, he was promoted to become the deputy secretary general of Guangdong Provincial Committee of the Chinese Communist Party, a position he held until February 2012, when he was appointed the executive vice-governor of Guangdong. In January 2017, he was appointed vice chairman of Guangdong People's Congress, serving in the post until his retirement in January 2021.

Government offices
| Preceded by Zhou Zhenhong | Mayor of Zhanjiang; 2002-2005 | Succeeded by Chen Yaoguang |
| Preceded by Xiao Zhiheng | Executive Vice-Governor of Guangdong; 2012-2017 | Succeeded by Lin Shaochun |
Party political offices
| Preceded by Deng Weilong | Communist Party Secretary of Zhanjiang; 2005-2008 | Succeeded by Chen Yaoguang |
