= Maogang District =

Former district of Maoming, China

Maogang (Chinese: 茂港; pinyin: Màogǎng) was a district of Maoming, Guangdong province, China. In 2014 it was merged with Dianbai County to form the new Dianbai District.
