= Zhou Zhenhong =

Chinese politician (born 1957)

Zhou Zhenhong (Chinese: 周镇宏; born October 1957) is a former Chinese politician, who most recently served as the head of the United Front Work Department of the Guangdong provincial Party Committee. Previously he also served as Communist Party Secretary of Maoming, a city in Guangdong province. Between 2008 and 2013, he served as a member of the National Committee of the Chinese People's Political Consultative Conference.

Zhou was born in Puning, Guangdong province, to a poor family of farmers. He was the eldest of three children. He worked as a farm hand as a child, entering a local production team when he was only ten years old. He excelled at school.

Following the Wukan protests, on January 16, 2012, Zhou was detained by investigators from the anti-graft agency of the Communist Party. On February 8, 2013, Zhou was expelled from the Chinese Communist Party for "serious violations of discipline and law." Zhou went on trial at the Xinyang Intermediate People's Court in Henan province in January 2014. He was charged with bribery and "amassing a large fortune of unclear origin." He was charged with taking bribes equivalent of some 24.64 million yuan (~$3.95 million). In February, the Henan Provincial High Court confirmed the lower court's ruling and sentenced Zhou to death with a two-year reprieve.

His successor, Luo Yinguo, was also charged with corruption.

Party political offices
Previous: Deng Weilong	Communist Party Secretary of Maoming; 2002–2007	Next: Luo Yinguo
