= Liang Yimin =

Chinese politician (born 1964)

- 梁毅民

Communist Party Secretary of Maoming
- In office February 2013 – October 2014
- Preceded by: Deng Haiguang
- Succeeded by: Xu Guang

Mayor of Maoming
- In office February 2011 – February 2013
- Preceded by: Deng Haiguang
- Succeeded by: Li Hongjun

Personal details
- Born: August 1964 (age 62) Kaiping, Guangdong, China
- Party: Chinese Communist Party (1987–2016; expelled)
- Education: Guangdong Central Party School of the Chinese Communist Party

Liang Yimin (Chinese: 梁毅民; pinyin: Liáng Yìmín; born August 1964) is a former Chinese politician from south China's Guangdong province. From February 2013 to October 2014 he served as Communist Party Secretary of Maoming. He was indicted on corruption charges in March 2015.

== Early life and education ==
Liang was born and raised in Kaiping, Guangdong. In February 1984, he attended Foshan Fiscal School. He graduated from Guangdong Central Party School of the Chinese Communist Party, earning an MBA degree.

== Career ==
He began working in October 1982 and joined the Chinese Communist Party in September 1987.

Beginning in 1982, he served in several posts in Kaiping Revenue and Tax Bureau, including director and party group secretary. From May 2000 to May 2003, he served as director and CPC Party Chief of Foshan Revenuetax Bureau.

In May 2003, he was appointed the Vice-Mayor of Foshan, a position he held until January 2007, he also served as CPC Party Chief of Chancheng District from May 2006 to July 2010.

He became CPC Party Chief of Shunde District in July 2010, he remained in that position until February 2011, when he was transferred to Maoming and appointed the Deputy CPC Party Chief and Mayor.

In February 2013 he was promoted to become the CPC Party Chief of Maoming, replacing Deng Haiguang (Chinese: 邓海光).

== Downfall ==
On October 14, 2014, he was being investigated by the Central Commission for Discipline Inspection for "serious violations of laws and regulations". He was indicted on criminal bribery charges in March 2015.

On December 5, 2016, he was expelled from the Chinese Communist Party and removed from public office.

Government offices
Preceded by Deng Haiguang	Mayor of Maoming; 2011–2013	Succeeded by Li Hongjun
Party political offices
Preceded by Deng Haiguang	Communist Party Secretary of Maoming; 2013–2014	Next: Xu Guang
