= Birds' Paradise =

Wetland park in Guangdong, China

Native name: 小鳥天堂
- Location within Guangdong

Geography
- Coordinates: 22°46′N 113°05′E

Administration
- China
- Province: Guangdong
- City: Jiangmen

Additional information
- Time zone: China Standard (UTC+8)
- Official website: 小鳥天堂官網

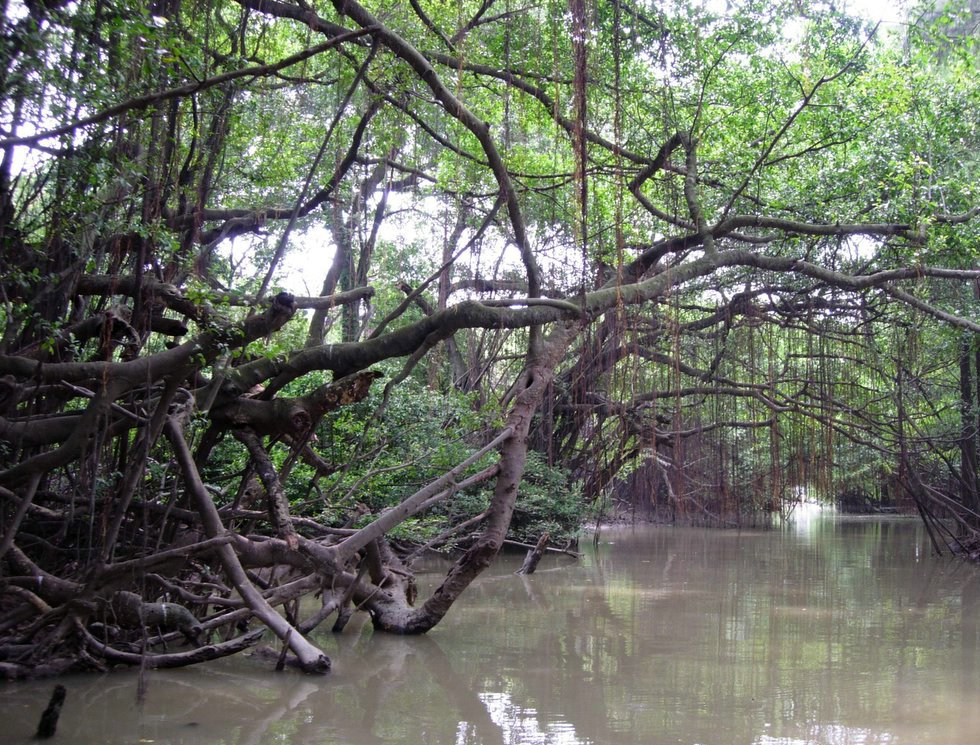

Birds' Paradise is located in Tianma Village, Xinhui District, Jiangmen, Guangdong Province, China. It is a unique tourist attraction which is known for its beautiful natural environment and rich bird life. The main body of Birds' Paradise is a small island with a thick banyan tree forest on it. In 1933, Ba Jin (巴金) happened to take a trip here, and was deeply impressed by its wonderful views, so he wrote a famous article, Birds' Heaven to in memory of this special experience. In 1984, Ba Jin (巴金) inscribed the words 小鳥天堂, and since then, this place was named after Birds' Paradise (小鳥天堂). In 2016, the local government decided to make Birds' Paradise a national wetland park.

== History ==
Its history can date back to the late Ming dynasty and the early Qing dynasty. It is said that a serious drought attacked the village around that time, so the villagers tried their best to dredge a river to water the farmland. However, the rich man in the village and the officers strongly disagreed with this, and they forced the villagers to block the channel, because they thought the river would destroy the geomancy (风水), which might become a threat to them later. Therefore, the villagers had no choice but to fill the river with soil, and thus a small island was formed. Someone inserted a branch into the small island, and the branch sprouted and grew into a banyan tree in the next year. Many years later that banyan tree had spread and developed into a forest, which gradually covered the island.

== Biology and ecology ==
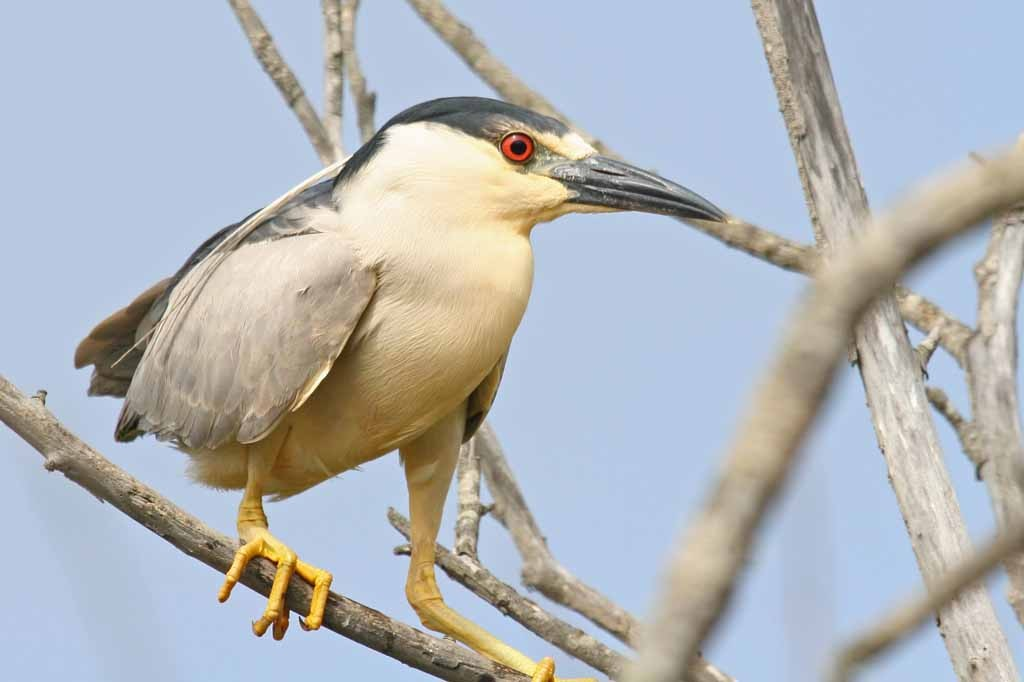
Black-crowned night heron

=== Animals ===
There are almost 40 species of birds inhabiting the forest in Birds' Paradise. The black-crowned night heron, Chinese pond heron and the western cattle egret are the most common birds found on the island. In addition, there are also other species of birds like the great egret, white wagtail, oriental magpie-robin, Eurasian blackbird, great tit, light-vented bulbul and the red-whiskered bulbul.

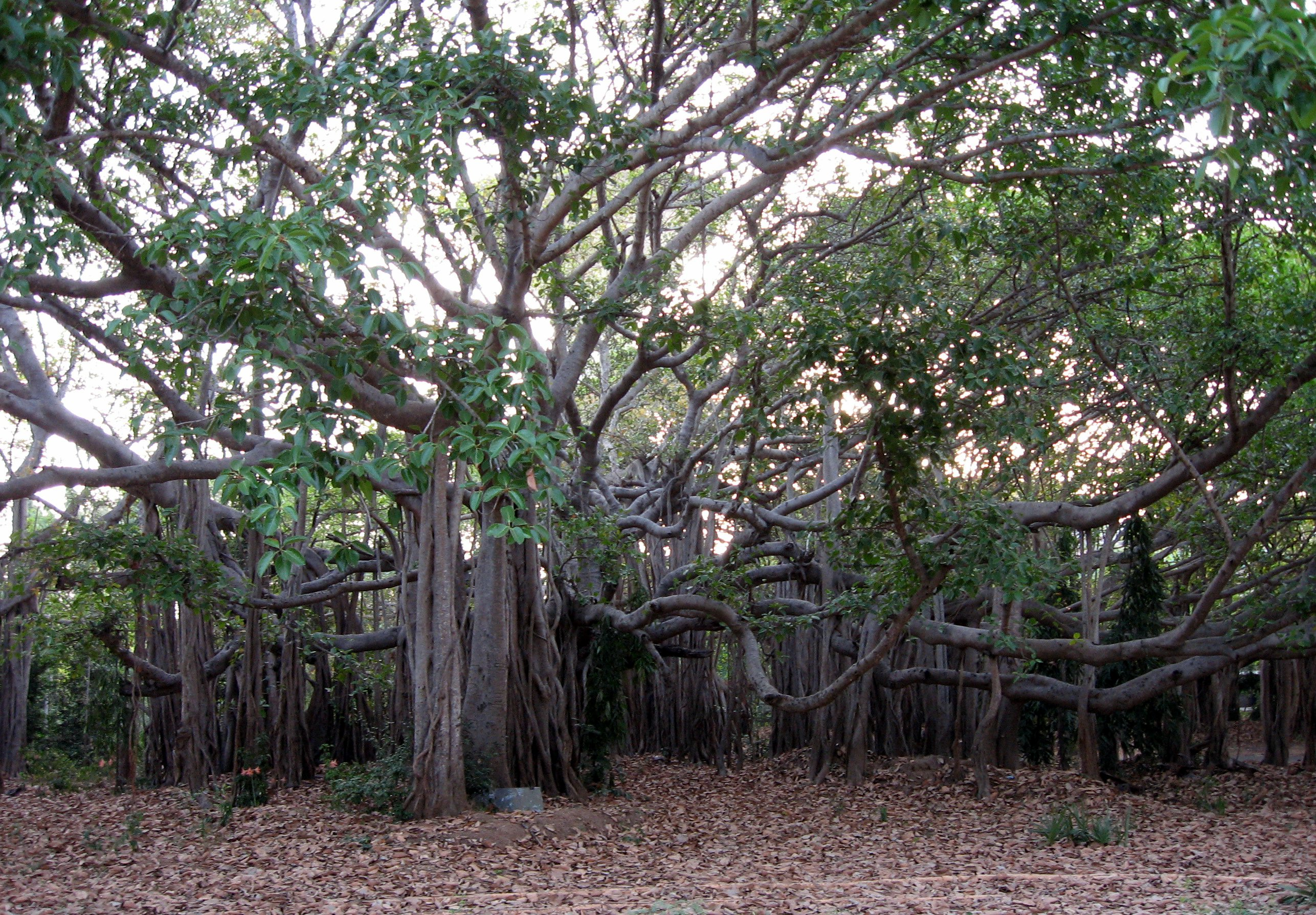

=== Flora ===
The thick forest on the island consists of many banyan trees. Among the forest, there is one especially large and ancient banyan tree, and it is so large that even ten people can not hold the tree. Besides, in order to make the environment more suitable for the birds to live, the staffs plant some other plants like Anubias, Salix babylonica, Hedychium coronarium, Nelumbo, Nelumbo nucifera and Argyranthemum frutescens, so that the ecosystem there can be more intact.

== Tourist attractions ==
=== Water Channel (榕荫水道) ===
The water channel around the island contains many banyan trees on both sides. These provide shade for visitors who can take boat trips to enjoy the scenery, as well as listen to local folk tunes, sung by professional singers.

=== Bird Museum (鸟博馆) ===
Covering an area of over 1500 square meters, the bird museum aims to share information about the site's avian fauna. Different kinds of bird specimens and pictures are displayed, whilst live bird shows are provided by trained staff.

=== Waterfront Culture Pavilion (水乡风情展示馆) ===
This pavilion shows visitors the special waterfront culture in Lingnan area (岭南地区). It contains exhibits relating to waterfront culture, including hand-tools, furniture, and old-styled clothing. Many items have been donated by the local people.

== Artwork ==
=== Ba Jin (巴金) – Birds' Heaven ===
Birds' Paradise was made famous by the passage Birds' Heaven, written by Ba Jin, a renowned Chinese writer. He visited the site in 1993 with friends, and was so impressed by the beautiful scene that he wrote about his trip. Many years later, this passage, Birds' Heaven, was listed into the textbook for primary school students. As a result of this article, many more people now know about this place.

=== Wu Guanzhong (吴冠中) – Paradise for Small Birds ===
This picture is an ink painting painted by Wu Guanzhong in 1989. After hearing about Birds' Paradise, Wu Guanzhong looked forward to visiting because he thought the site might accord with his own ideal image of paradise. When he finally arrived, he was so impressed by its scenery that he decided to draw it. In 1992, Wu Guanzhong donated this picture to the British Museum in London.
