= Lady Xian =

Li noblewoman (512–602)

- 冼夫人
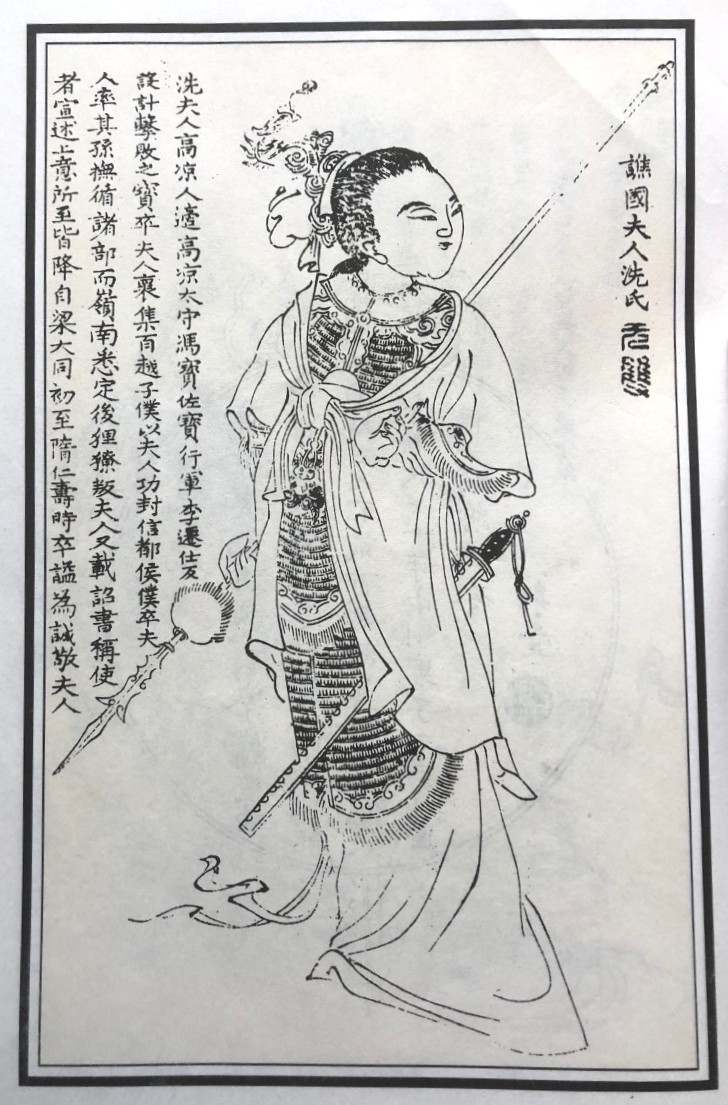
- Born: c.516 modern-day Guangdong, Liang dynasty
- Died: 602 modern-day Hainan, Sui dynasty
- Other names: Lady Sin, Madame Xian, Lady of Qiaoguo, Lady Chengjing
- Military career
- Allegiance: Sui dynasty
- Nickname: Saintly Mother of Lingnan
- Conflicts: Hou Jing Rebellion

Lady Xian (or Hsien, Chinese: 冼夫人; pinyin: Xiǎn Fūrén; Jyutping: sin2 fu1 jan4; Vietnamese: Tiển phu nhân; 512–602), also known as Lady of Qiao Guo (or Ch'iao Kuo; Chinese: 譙國夫人), born as Xian Zhen (冼珍), was a hereditary chieftain of the Li people, born to the chieftain of the Xian tribe in Southern China, in what is now Guangdong. She has been deified as the "Saintly Mother of Lingnan" (岭南圣母). She died during a tour of Hainan. Former Chinese Premier Zhou Enlai called her "the First Heroine of China", and Chinese Communist Party general secretary Jiang Zemin praised her as "the role model that the later generations should learn forever". Lady Xian is depicted in the Wu Shuang Pu (Table of Peerless Heroes) by Jin Guliang.

== Life ==
Lady Xian was born in 512 to the chieftain of the Xian clan of the Li people in Southern China. She lived during the Sui dynasty in what is now Guangdong in Southern China. Her family were hereditary leaders of their clan.

She was a notable leader who successfully defended her clan against its enemies, eventually earning her title as Lady of Qiaoguo. Her clan's people were in frequent conflict with neighboring clans. She often tried to prevent them from being involved in wars by relying on diplomacy and negotiations. Her brother Xian Ting, the governor (刺史) of Nanliangzhou (南梁州), was conceited from wealth (as a result of being trading partners with the Chinese) so he often harassed the surrounding counties or robbed them of their belongings, which made people in the Lingnan area miserable. Lady Xian often persuaded him not to do bad things so people's resentment subsided gradually. Thus, thousands of people from Dan'er Commandery (儋耳郡) of Hainan were attracted by her fame and joined her.

In 535, she married Feng Bao (馮寶), a Chinese general and son of Feng Rong (馮融), and encouraged an appreciation of Chinese ways among her people. She also helped her son Feng Pu (馮僕) with the local affairs. She was impartial and incorruptible when resolving the lawsuits. She would punish her clan's people if they committed crimes. As a result, Feng established their authority in the local place. From then on, nobody dared to disobey the government decrees.

Because she was a woman of a people who wished to remain autonomous from the Chen dynasty, her accomplishments shocked many Chinese. It is exceptional that any records of her written by Chinese historians exist at all. Emperor Chen Shubao of the Chen dynasty had been impressed with her achievements and bestowed her with many awards, including the title "Lady of Qiaoguo".

She died in 602 of old age and was honored with the posthumous name of Lady Chengjing (誠敬夫人).

== Family ==
Among her children, only Feng Pu was known by name. He accompanied his mother into many battles, and like her, he was bestowed awards by the Chen emperor. Lady Xian had three grandsons named Feng Hun, Feng Xian, and Feng Ang. They were all bestowed awards by the emperor. During the Chinese New Year or other festivals, Lady Xian would take out all her gifts sent by the emperors of the Liang, Chen and Sui dynasties and placed them in the yard. She told her grandsons that "You all should be loyal to the emperor. I had served emperors of three dynasties with loyalty! All these gifts granted by them were the reward of my loyalty. So I hope you all can think about that and be loyal to the emperor. (Original: "汝等宜尽赤心向天子，我事三代主，唯用一好心。今赐物俱存，此忠孝之报也。愿汝皆思念之!"). She asked her grandsons to be loyal to the emperor as she did.

== Main achievements ==
=== Cultural development ===
During the Southern and Northern dynasties, human trafficking was very frequent in the area. According to the biography of Wang Sengru in the Book of Liang, Wang Sengru was the Prefecture of Nanhai. Every year many foreign boats docked here because many people were sold in Gaoliang. These foreign businessmen traded their goods for people being sold here. At that time, many businessmen in this county made money by doing this trade, which the officials permitted and did not take any action to prevent it. When Lady Xian rose to power, she took efforts to promote Han feudal culture and successfully abolished the Li trafficking system. She told the Li people to do more good things and be loyal to the country. Moreover, she encouraged the Han Chinese's intermarriage to the people of the Li, which greatly promoted the ethnic communication and integration.

=== Suppressing the Hou Jing Rebellion ===
In 548, Hou Jing rebelled against the Liang dynasty, which had a destructive effect on the whole country. In 550, Li Qianshi, the rebel leader from Gaozhou tried to entice Feng Bao to join the rebellion, but Lady Xian dissuaded him from joining the rebellion. He defeated Li Qianshi's forces, thus helping general Chen Baxian suppress the Hou Jing rebellion. Her achievement is recorded in detail in the Book of Sui.

=== Quelling civil disturbances ===
In 558, Chen Baxian established the Chen dynasty. Xiao Bo, the feudal provincial of Guangzhou sent out troops to attack him, while some other ambitious provincial leaders rose in rebellion, throwing Lingnan into chaos and driving many locals into homelessness and poverty. To restore the peace of Lingnan, Lady Xian adopted the strategy named "to rule is superior than to do battle". (治胜于战). She posted notices to warn the governors of nearby counties not to join Xiao, but to focus on the public security and stop the fighting. She promised that if they stop the rebellion, they will not be punished.

Meanwhile, she made strict discipline on her military, in which soldiers who committed crimes such as robbing or killing, will have their heads cut off and displayed in public. The rebel leaders took her advice so the insurgency subsided quickly.

== Titles (封号) ==
In the Chen dynasty (570), she was given the title "Grand Lady of Shilong" (石龙太夫人). According to the History of the Northern Dynasties, she was given the title of "Grand Lady Countess of Gaoliang" (高凉郡太夫人).

In the Sui dynasty (589), she was entitled "Lady Countess of Songkang" (宋康郡夫人). In 601, she was elevated to the "Lady Duchess of Qiao State" (谯国夫人). When she died, she was honored with the posthumous name of "Lady of Sincere Reverence" (诚敬夫人).

In the Five Dynasties and Ten Kingdoms, she was honored as the "Lady of Pure Blessing" (清福夫人).

In the Southern Song dynasty, the emperor granted her the honorifics "Lady of Responsive Grace" (显应夫人) and "Lady of Gentle Benevolence" (柔惠夫人).

In the Qing dynasty (1864), the Tongzhi Emperor granted her the epithet of "Compassionate Protector" (慈佑).

== Temples ==
Lady Xian was honored by successive emperors and the common people, with many temples being built to commemorate her. By the end of 1940s, there were several hundred temples in China, mostly in the Lingnan region, and some were also located in Malaysia and Vietnam. The first temple was built in the end of the Sui dynasty. The largest and most important was the Temple of Madam Xian is in Gaozhou, which was visited by former CCP General Secretary Jiang Zemin in 2000. In 2002, the temple was listed as a key culture protection site by the Guangdong Provincial Government. The 24th day of the 11th lunar month is the traditional feast day of Lady Xian.

== See also ==
- The Royal Diaries, where she is mentioned in the section Lady of Chi'ao Kuo: Warrior of the South taking place in 531 A.D. when she was nineteen.
- Cantonese folktales
