= Huazhou, Guangdong =

Huazhou 化州市
- County-level city
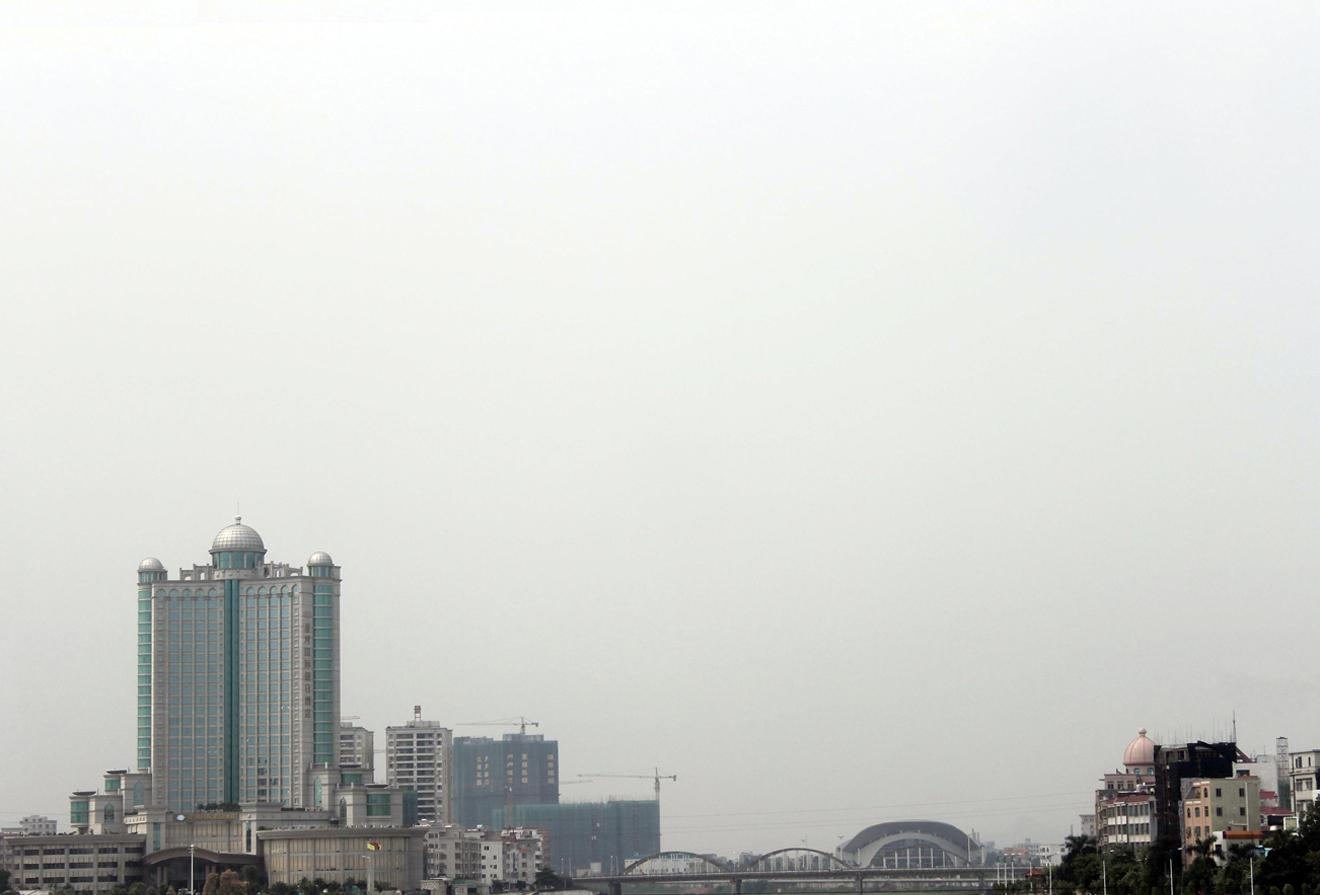

- Location in Guangdong
- Coordinates: 21°39′50″N 110°38′23″E
- Country: People's Republic of China
- Province: Guangdong
- Prefecture-level city: Maoming

Area
  - Total: 2,354 km^{2} (909 sq mi)

Population (2020 census)
  - Total: 1,291,668
  - Density: 548.7/km^{2} (1,421/sq mi)
- Time zone: UTC+8 (China Standard)
- Postal code: 525100
- Area code: 0668
- Website: http://www.huazhou.gov.cn/

Huazhou
- Simplified Chinese: 化州
- Postal: Fachow; Fahsien
- Literal meaning: Changing Prefecture
Transcriptions
Standard Mandarin
- Hanyu Pinyin: Huàzhōu
Yue: Cantonese
- Jyutping: faa^{3}zau^{1}

Huazhou (Chinese: 化州市; pinyin: Huàzhōu Shì), formerly romanized as Fachow or Fahsien, (Note: "Fachow" derives from the Cantonese pronunciation of the name, while "Fahsien" is a partially-Cantonese, partially-Mandarin form of "Hua County". The town and county were also formerly romanized as Hua-choo.) is a county-level city in southwestern Guangdong Province, China. Bordering Guangxi to the north, it is administrated as part of the prefecture-level city of Maoming. During the 2020 census, its population was 1,291,668, of which 472,746 were based in areas that were considered urban.

== History ==
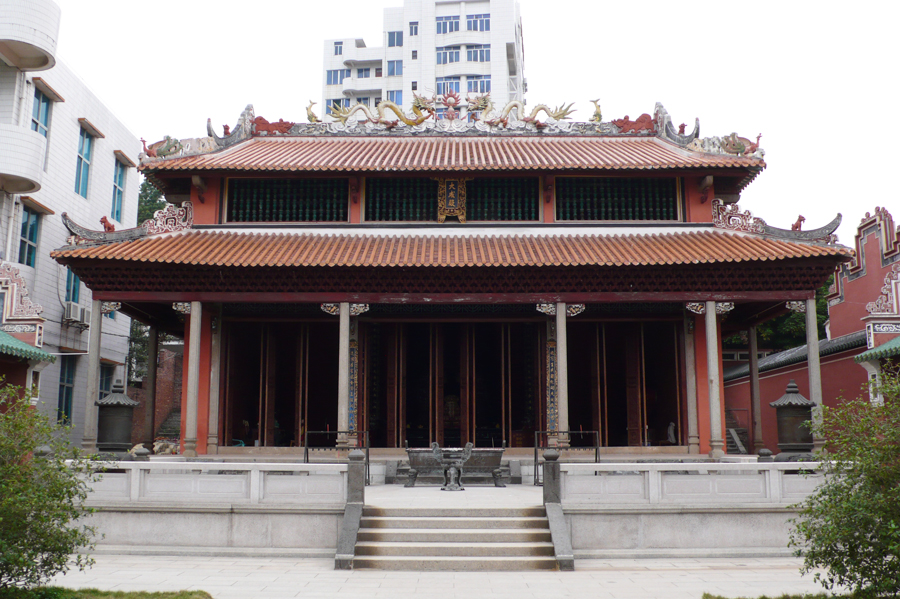
A temple in Huazhou

During the Three Kingdoms period, the area was organized as Guanghua County (simplified Chinese: 广化县; traditional Chinese: 廣化縣).

During the Song dynasty, the area became the seat of Hua Prefecture, Huazhou later became the seat of Hua County, which formed part of Gaozhou Commandery.

After the Chinese Civil War, it was reorganized and placed under the administration of Maoming.

In 1959, Hua County (Chinese: 化县) and Wuchuan County (Chinese: 吴川县) merged to become Huazhou County.

In 1994, Huazhou was changed from a county to a county-level city.

== Climate ==
Huazhou has a humid subtropical climate, with a long lasting summer and short winter, which is influenced by the East Asian monsoon. The weather is warm and sunny. The mean annual temperature ranges from 22.2 °C to 23.9 °C, and the average yearly temperature is 22.9 °C. It is wet in summer with high temperature, high humidity while mild and comparatively dry in winter. When the cold wave comes in winter, sometimes there severe cold days. Huazhou has an abundant precipitation and the average annual precipitation is 1890mm. But with an apparent monsoon climate, the rainfall displays an extremely uneven characteristic, mainly focus on summer and autumn. Typhoons, storms, and floods are very frequent during summer and autumn, causing great damage to the local people's lives and property sometimes.

Climate data for Huazhou, elevation 32 m (105 ft), (1991–2020 normals, extremes 1981–present)
Month	Jan	Feb	Mar	Apr	May	Jun	Jul	Aug	Sep	Oct	Nov	Dec	Year
Record high °C (°F)	28.4 (83.1)	30.9 (87.6)	33.1 (91.6)	35.6 (96.1)	36.7 (98.1)	37.1 (98.8)	38.0 (100.4)	38.8 (101.8)	36.8 (98.2)	36.0 (96.8)	33.0 (91.4)	29.1 (84.4)	38.8 (101.8)
Mean daily maximum °C (°F)	20.6 (69.1)	21.5 (70.7)	23.9 (75.0)	27.3 (81.1)	30.6 (87.1)	32.0 (89.6)	32.5 (90.5)	32.6 (90.7)	31.9 (89.4)	30.0 (86.0)	26.7 (80.1)	22.5 (72.5)	27.7 (81.8)
Daily mean °C (°F)	15.9 (60.6)	17.4 (63.3)	20.3 (68.5)	23.9 (75.0)	26.8 (80.2)	28.2 (82.8)	28.6 (83.5)	28.2 (82.8)	27.4 (81.3)	25.2 (77.4)	21.5 (70.7)	17.4 (63.3)	23.4 (74.1)
Mean daily minimum °C (°F)	12.9 (55.2)	14.8 (58.6)	18.0 (64.4)	21.6 (70.9)	24.3 (75.7)	25.7 (78.3)	25.9 (78.6)	25.5 (77.9)	24.5 (76.1)	21.8 (71.2)	18.1 (64.6)	13.9 (57.0)	20.6 (69.0)
Record low °C (°F)	2.3 (36.1)	3.7 (38.7)	4.8 (40.6)	11.1 (52.0)	15.9 (60.6)	19.7 (67.5)	21.4 (70.5)	21.7 (71.1)	17.0 (62.6)	10.1 (50.2)	6.5 (43.7)	1.3 (34.3)	1.3 (34.3)
Average precipitation mm (inches)	33.3 (1.31)	39.9 (1.57)	67.7 (2.67)	135.1 (5.32)	260.0 (10.24)	320.6 (12.62)	317.8 (12.51)	308.2 (12.13)	205.2 (8.08)	98.0 (3.86)	43.7 (1.72)	36.4 (1.43)	1,865.9 (73.46)
Average precipitation days (≥ 0.1 mm)	7.4	9.2	11.4	11.9	16.2	19.5	18.5	19.3	14.0	6.5	5.7	5.6	145.2
Average relative humidity (%)	78	82	84	85	85	86	85	85	82	76	75	74	81
Mean monthly sunshine hours	115.3	86.7	73.0	101.6	160.0	169.2	207.3	198.0	194.6	207.2	176.3	150.8	1,840
Percentage possible sunshine	34	27	20	27	39	42	51	50	53	58	53	45	42
Source: China Meteorological Administrationall-time Jun highall-time October record

== Administrative divisions ==
Huazhou has jurisdiction over 5 subdistricts, 17 towns, and 8 other township-level divisions.

=== Subdistricts ===
The city's 5 subdistricts are Hexi Subdistrict, Dongshan Subdistrict, Xiaguo Subdistrict, Nansheng Subdistrict, and Shiwan Subdistrict.

=== Towns ===
The city's 17 towns are Changqi, Tongqing, Yangmei, Liangguang, Daqiao, Ligang, Xin'an, Guanqiao, Linchen, Hejiang, Nawu, Boyang, Baoxu, Pingding, Wenlou, Jianghu, and Zhongdong.

=== Other township-level divisions ===
Huazhou also administers a number of other units which function as township-level divisions, including 1 development zone and 7 farms. The city's sole township-level development zone is Jianjiang Development Zone. The city's township-level farms are Xinshidai Farm (Chinese: 新时代农场), Xinhua Farm, Heping Farm, Hongyang Farm (Chinese: 红阳农场), Hongfeng Farm (Chinese: 红峰农场), Jianshe Farm (Chinese: 建设农场), and Shitan Farm (Chinese: 石滩农场).

== Economy ==
As of 2019, the city's gross domestic product totaled ¥55.176 billion, and grew at an annualized rate of 4.3%. Of this, the primary sector accounted for ¥12.827 billion, or 23.2% of the economy, and grew at an annualized rate of 3.8%; the secondary sector accounted for ¥13.573 billion, or 24.6% of the economy, and shrunk at an annualized rate of 0.5%; the tertiary sector accounted for ¥28.776 billion, or 52.2% of the economy, and grew at an annualized rate of 7.4%.

=== Agriculture ===
In 2019, Huazhou produced 337,800 tons of grain, a 3.6% annual increase, 730,000 tons of fruit, a 7.4% annual increase, and 691,000 tons of vegetables, an 8.4% increase.

=== Foreign trade ===
The city reported ¥2.862 billion in foreign trade in 2019, a 28.0% increase from the previous year. Of this, Huazhou exported ¥2.818 billion in goods and services, while importing just ¥44 million in goods and services.

=== Industry ===
Huazhou's industrial output declined in size in 2019 by 4.6%. This decline was led by a 17.3% decline in industrial output from firms classified as large by the city, while medium-sized enterprises saw a 4.5% increase in industrial output, and small enterprises saw a more moderate 3.3% decline in output. Huazhou's largest industry as of 2019 is in food processing, which added ¥1.457 billion to the local economy in 2019. The next three largest industries are the city's metallurgy industry, pharmaceutical industry, and mineral processing industry, which added ¥486 million, ¥411 million, and ¥222 million to the local economy, respectively.

=== Real estate ===
The city's real estate industry saw ¥3.947 billion in investment in 2019, which represented a significant decrease from the previous year. Despite this, the total area of real estate sold in Huazhou in 2019 increased 0.8% from the previous year.

=== Retail sales ===
Huazhou's total consumer retail sales in 2019 totaled ¥23.59 billion, which grew from previous years, with stronger growth in the city's urban areas.

=== Services ===
The city's tertiary sector comprises the majority of the city's economic output in 2019, and grew faster than its primary and secondary sectors. In 2019, Huazhou saw significant growth in real estate services, logistical services, financial services, and other service industries.
