= Dianbai, Maoming =

Dianbai 电白区 Tinpak
- District
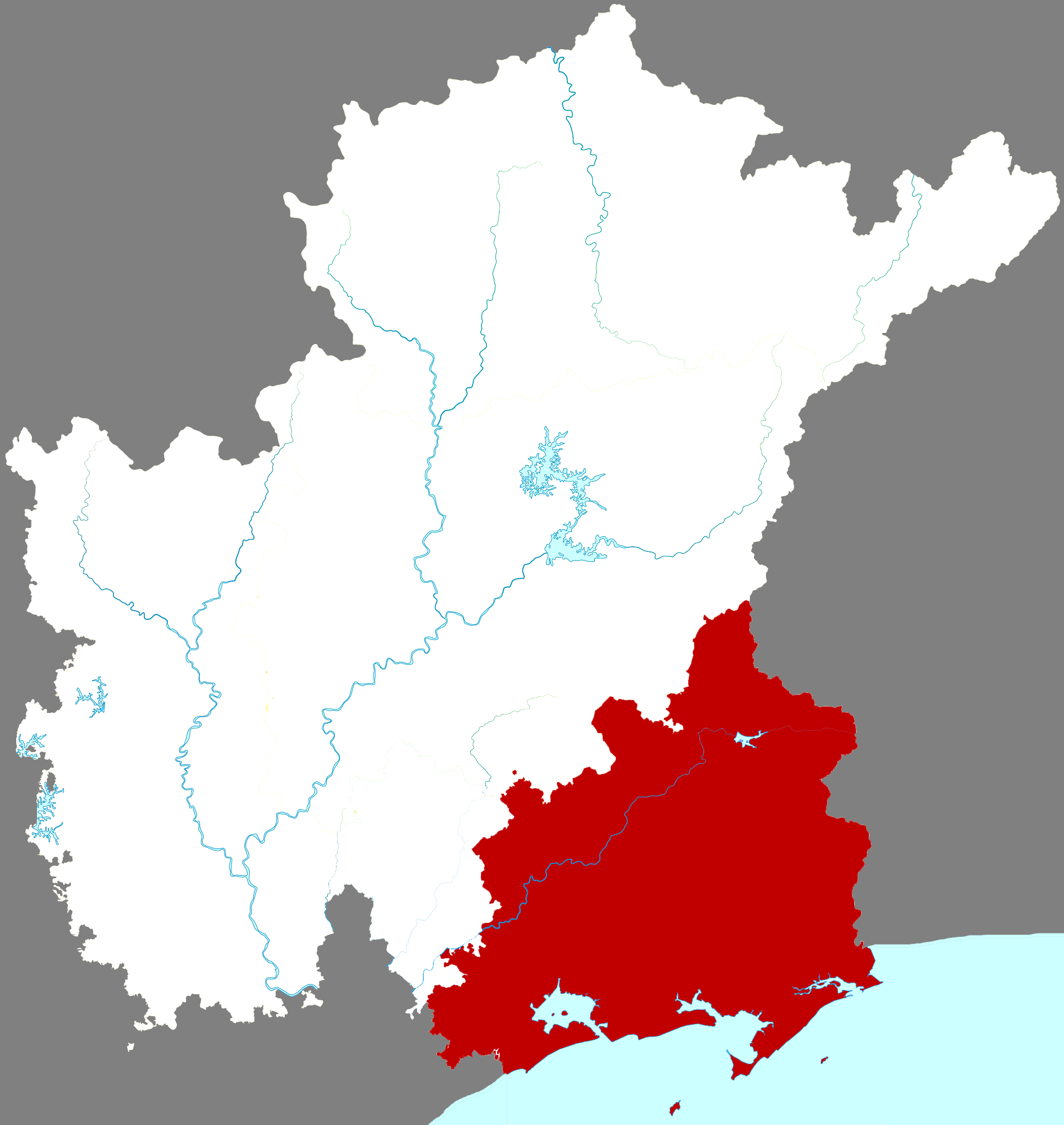
- Location of Dianbai in Maoming

- Location in Guangdong
- Coordinates: 21°42′N 111°11′E
- Country: People's Republic of China
- Province: Guangdong
- Prefecture-level city: Maoming

Area
  - Total: 1,855 km^{2} (716 sq mi)

Population (2020)
  - Total: 1,503,737
  - Density: 810.6/km^{2} (2,100/sq mi)
- Time zone: UTC+8 (China Standard)

Dianbai, Maoming
- Simplified Chinese: 电白
- Traditional Chinese: 電白
- Postal: Tinpak
Transcriptions
Standard Mandarin
- Hanyu Pinyin: Diànbái
- Wade–Giles: Tien-pai
Yue: Cantonese
- Jyutping: Din6-baak6

Dianbai District, alternately romanized as Tinpak, (Note: The Postal Map romanization reflects the local Cantonese pronunciation of the name. It was also formerly romanized as Teen-pih and Teën-pih.) is an urban district of the prefecture-level city of Maoming in southwestern Guangdong Province, China.

== History ==
Dianbei Commandery was established in AD 528 under the Liang dynasty. It and the subsequent Dianbei County were organized under Gaozhou Commandery. Under the Qing, Dianbai was one of the major ports of Guangdong. After the Chinese Civil War, it was placed under Maoming and eventually promoted to an urban district. Dianbai absorbed Maoming's former Maogang District on 23 February 2014.

== Climate ==
Climate data for Dianbai, elevation 32 m (105 ft), (1991–2020 normals, extremes 1981–2010)
Month	Jan	Feb	Mar	Apr	May	Jun	Jul	Aug	Sep	Oct	Nov	Dec	Year
Record high °C (°F)	28.1 (82.6)	30.8 (87.4)	30.7 (87.3)	33.1 (91.6)	34.8 (94.6)	37.1 (98.8)	38.2 (100.8)	37.5 (99.5)	35.4 (95.7)	35.1 (95.2)	32.7 (90.9)	29.8 (85.6)	38.2 (100.8)
Mean daily maximum °C (°F)	20.9 (69.6)	21.5 (70.7)	23.9 (75.0)	27.0 (80.6)	30.2 (86.4)	31.6 (88.9)	32.0 (89.6)	32.2 (90.0)	31.6 (88.9)	29.9 (85.8)	26.7 (80.1)	22.7 (72.9)	27.5 (81.5)
Daily mean °C (°F)	16.4 (61.5)	17.6 (63.7)	20.5 (68.9)	23.8 (74.8)	26.9 (80.4)	28.4 (83.1)	28.7 (83.7)	28.3 (82.9)	27.4 (81.3)	25.3 (77.5)	21.9 (71.4)	17.8 (64.0)	23.6 (74.4)
Mean daily minimum °C (°F)	13.3 (55.9)	15.1 (59.2)	18.1 (64.6)	21.6 (70.9)	24.5 (76.1)	26.0 (78.8)	26.1 (79.0)	25.6 (78.1)	24.5 (76.1)	21.9 (71.4)	18.4 (65.1)	14.5 (58.1)	20.8 (69.4)
Record low °C (°F)	3.2 (37.8)	4.4 (39.9)	5.2 (41.4)	11.6 (52.9)	16.0 (60.8)	18.5 (65.3)	22.1 (71.8)	22.1 (71.8)	17.2 (63.0)	11.7 (53.1)	6.0 (42.8)	2.0 (35.6)	2.0 (35.6)
Average precipitation mm (inches)	36.5 (1.44)	35.1 (1.38)	55.5 (2.19)	118.8 (4.68)	219.0 (8.62)	238.9 (9.41)	256.0 (10.08)	280.9 (11.06)	205.0 (8.07)	88.5 (3.48)	25.5 (1.00)	34.6 (1.36)	1,594.3 (62.77)
Average precipitation days (≥ 0.1 mm)	5.9	7.7	9.1	11.0	14.1	15.8	15.2	16.9	13.8	6.2	5.4	5.0	126.1
Average relative humidity (%)	78	82	85	87	86	85	84	85	83	76	74	72	81
Mean monthly sunshine hours	124.6	93.7	80.5	102.5	165.4	183.1	218.1	203.5	193.6	210.8	176.9	153.0	1,905.7
Percentage possible sunshine	37	29	22	27	41	46	53	51	53	59	53	46	43
Source: China Meteorological Administration
