= Maonan, Maoming =

Maonan 茂南区
- District
- Location in Guangdong
- Coordinates: 21°42′31″N 110°55′05″E
- Country: People's Republic of China
- Province: Guangdong
- Prefecture-level city: Maoming

Area
  - Total: 507 km^{2} (196 sq mi)

Population (2018)
  - Total: 1,022,100
  - Density: 2,020/km^{2} (5,220/sq mi)
- Time zone: UTC+8 (China Standard)

Maonan (Chinese: 茂南; pinyin: Màonán) is a district of Maoming, Guangdong province, China. Subdivisions include Hexi Subdistrict, Hedong Subdistrict, Xinhua Subdistrict, Zhanqian Subdistrict, Chengnan Subdistrict, Jintang Town, Gongguan Town, Xinpo Town, Zhensheng Town, Aotao Town, Meihua Town, Gaoshan Town, Shange Town, and Yangjiao Town.
