= Gaozhou =

Gaozhou 高州市 Kochow
- County-level & Sub-prefectural city
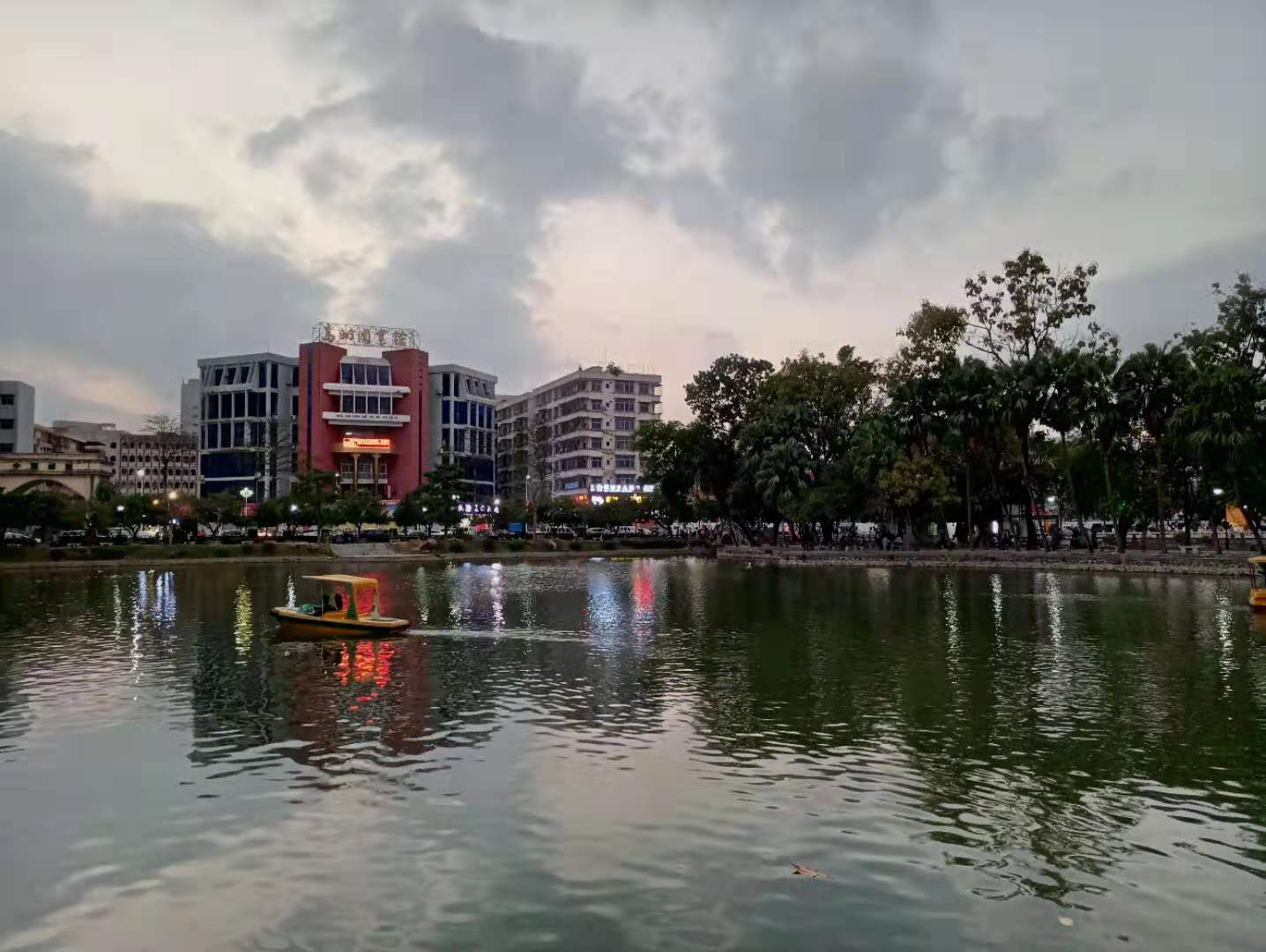

- Location in Guangdong
- Coordinates: 21°55′28″N 110°50′32″E
- Country: People's Republic of China
- Province: Guangdong
- Prefecture-level city: Maoming
- County seat: Panzhou (潘州)

Area
  - Total: 3,270.8 km^{2} (1,262.9 sq mi)

Population (2020 census)
  - Total: 1,328,658
  - Density: 406.22/km^{2} (1,052.1/sq mi)
- Time zone: UTC+8 (China Standard)
- Postal code: 525200
- Area code: 0668
- Website: www.gaozhou.gov.cn

Gaozhou
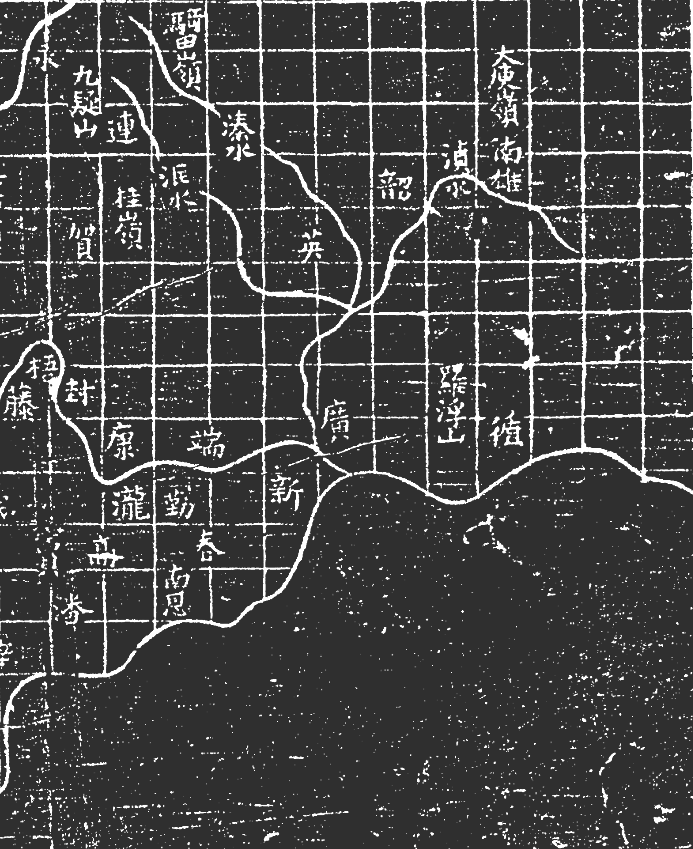
- Gaozhou and Panzhou on the 1136 Yuji Tu
- Chinese: 高州
- Literal meaning: High Prefecture
Transcriptions
Standard Mandarin
- Hanyu Pinyin: Gāozhōu
Yue: Cantonese
- Yale Romanization: Kochow

Gaozhou is a county-level city in southwestern Guangdong Province, China. Formerly the primary city in the area, it is now administered as part of the prefecture-level city of Maoming. As of the 2020 census, Gaozhou had a population of 1,328,658 living in its 3,270.86 km^{2} (1,262.89 sq mi) territory; however, its built-up (or metro) area is much smaller. The locals speak a variation of the Gaozhou dialect. It is best known in China for being the ancestral home of Leo Ku.

== History ==
Gaozhou is a historically important city in Guangdong. Under the Qing, it was the seat of Gaozhou Commandery, overseeing Dianbai, Huazhou, Maoming, "Sih-ching", Wuchuan, and Xinyi Counties. After the Chinese Civil War, it was placed under the administration of Maoming as Gaozhou County and then promoted to county-level city status in 1993.

== Administration ==
Administratively, Gaozhou is a county-level city under the jurisdiction of the provincial-level city Maoming in Guangdong Province. The city of Gaozhou consists of five districts (Panzhou, Shanmei, Baoguang, Shizailing, and Jinshan); the county includes another 23 towns.

== Geography ==
Gaozhou is located 420 km (260 mi) from Shenzhen and Guangzhou, and 450 km (280 mi) from Hong Kong.

== Transportation ==
- China National Highway 207
- China National expressway G65
- China National expressway S14

== Climate ==
Climate data for Gaozhou, elevation 77 m (253 ft), (1991–2020 normals, extremes 1981–present)
Month	Jan	Feb	Mar	Apr	May	Jun	Jul	Aug	Sep	Oct	Nov	Dec	Year
Record high °C (°F)	28.9 (84.0)	31.8 (89.2)	33.3 (91.9)	34.4 (93.9)	36.1 (97.0)	37.0 (98.6)	38.7 (101.7)	37.8 (100.0)	37.1 (98.8)	35.6 (96.1)	33.5 (92.3)	29.8 (85.6)	38.7 (101.7)
Mean daily maximum °C (°F)	21.1 (70.0)	22.0 (71.6)	24.5 (76.1)	27.9 (82.2)	31.0 (87.8)	32.3 (90.1)	32.9 (91.2)	33.0 (91.4)	32.3 (90.1)	30.4 (86.7)	27.1 (80.8)	23.0 (73.4)	28.1 (82.6)
Daily mean °C (°F)	15.6 (60.1)	17.2 (63.0)	20.4 (68.7)	23.9 (75.0)	26.7 (80.1)	28.1 (82.6)	28.5 (83.3)	28.1 (82.6)	27.2 (81.0)	24.8 (76.6)	21.1 (70.0)	16.9 (62.4)	23.2 (73.8)
Mean daily minimum °C (°F)	11.8 (53.2)	13.9 (57.0)	17.3 (63.1)	21.0 (69.8)	23.8 (74.8)	25.2 (77.4)	25.5 (77.9)	25.1 (77.2)	23.9 (75.0)	20.8 (69.4)	16.9 (62.4)	12.9 (55.2)	19.8 (67.7)
Record low °C (°F)	1.8 (35.2)	3.2 (37.8)	4.4 (39.9)	10.2 (50.4)	15.2 (59.4)	18.9 (66.0)	21.6 (70.9)	22.0 (71.6)	15.8 (60.4)	10.9 (51.6)	4.3 (39.7)	0.6 (33.1)	0.6 (33.1)
Average precipitation mm (inches)	44.4 (1.75)	45.0 (1.77)	65.6 (2.58)	143.8 (5.66)	245.3 (9.66)	338.0 (13.31)	270.5 (10.65)	303.7 (11.96)	175.7 (6.92)	70.3 (2.77)	37.3 (1.47)	35.8 (1.41)	1,775.4 (69.91)
Average precipitation days (≥ 0.1 mm)	7.0	8.7	11.1	12.6	16.1	19.5	18.7	19.6	13.9	6.6	5.3	5.9	145
Average relative humidity (%)	78	80	82	83	84	85	84	85	82	77	75	74	81
Mean monthly sunshine hours	111.1	85.0	69.5	96.3	150.2	152.3	195.0	185.7	181.5	196.2	165.4	145.9	1,734.1
Percentage possible sunshine	33	26	19	25	37	38	48	47	50	55	50	44	39
Source: China Meteorological Administrationall-time October record

== See also ==
- List of administrative divisions of Guangdong
