= Maoming =

Maoming 茂名市 Mowming
- Prefecture-level city
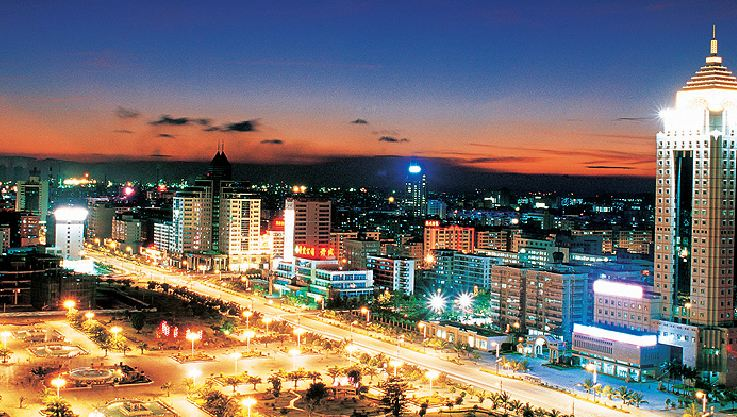
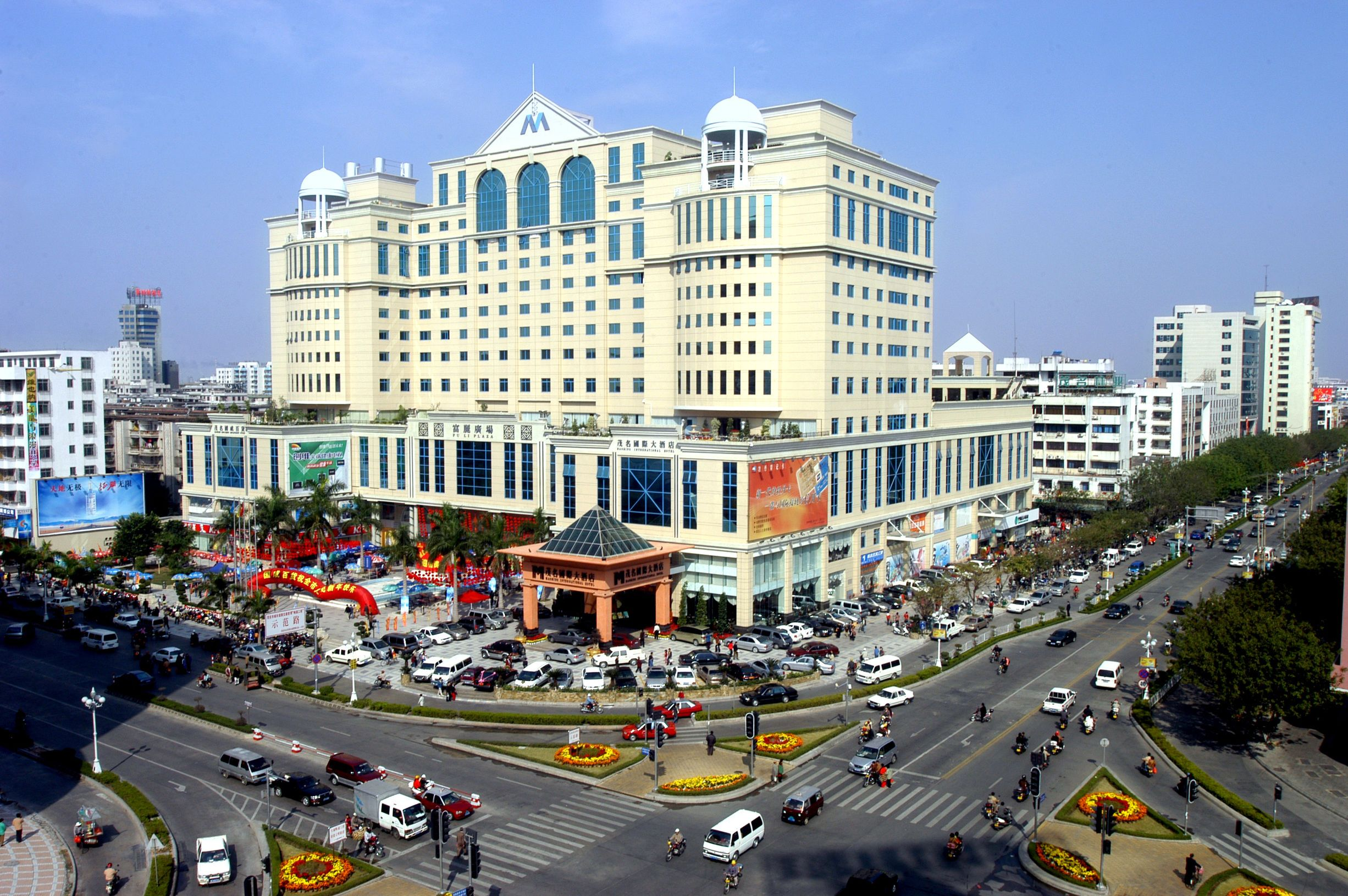
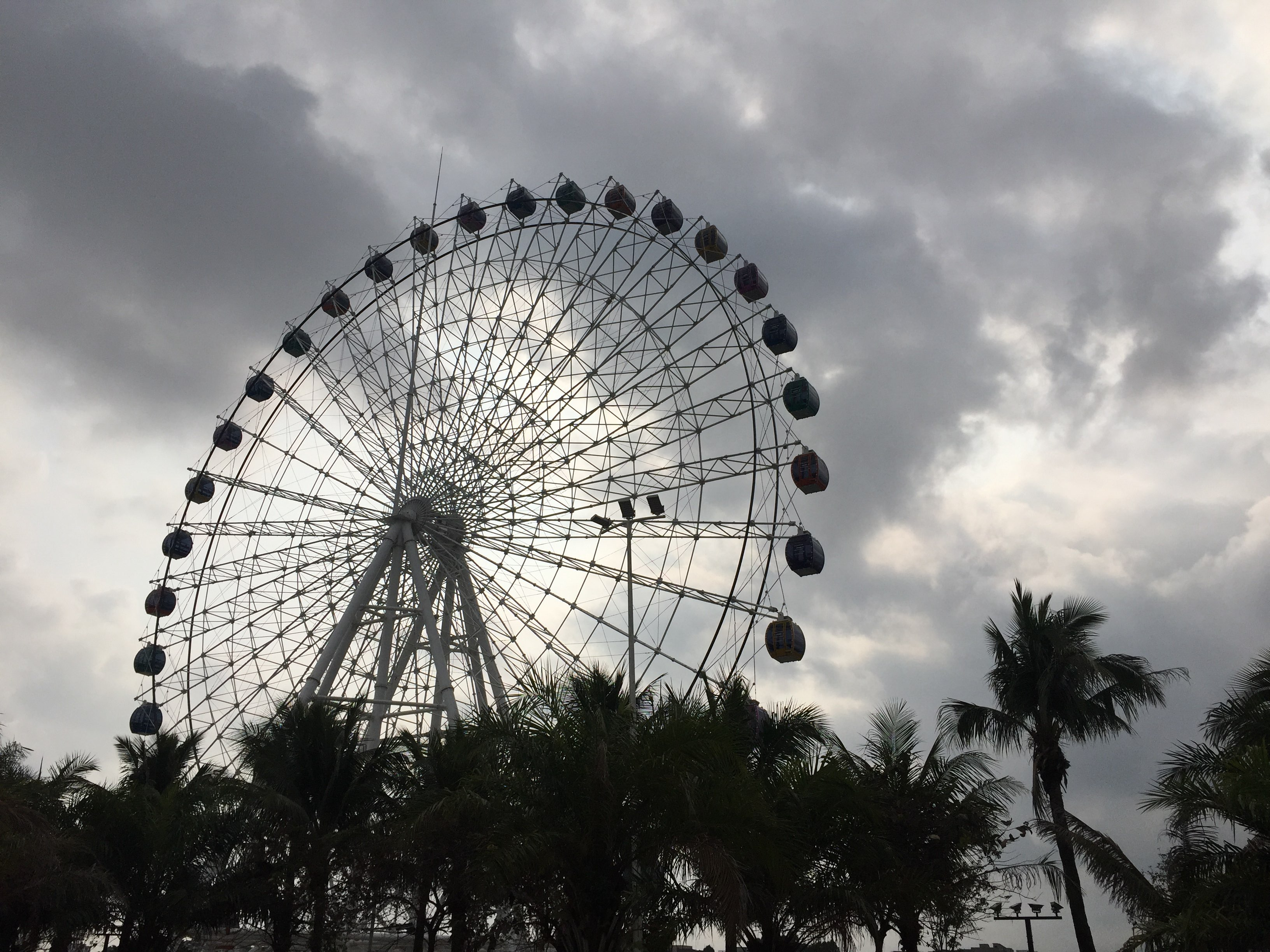
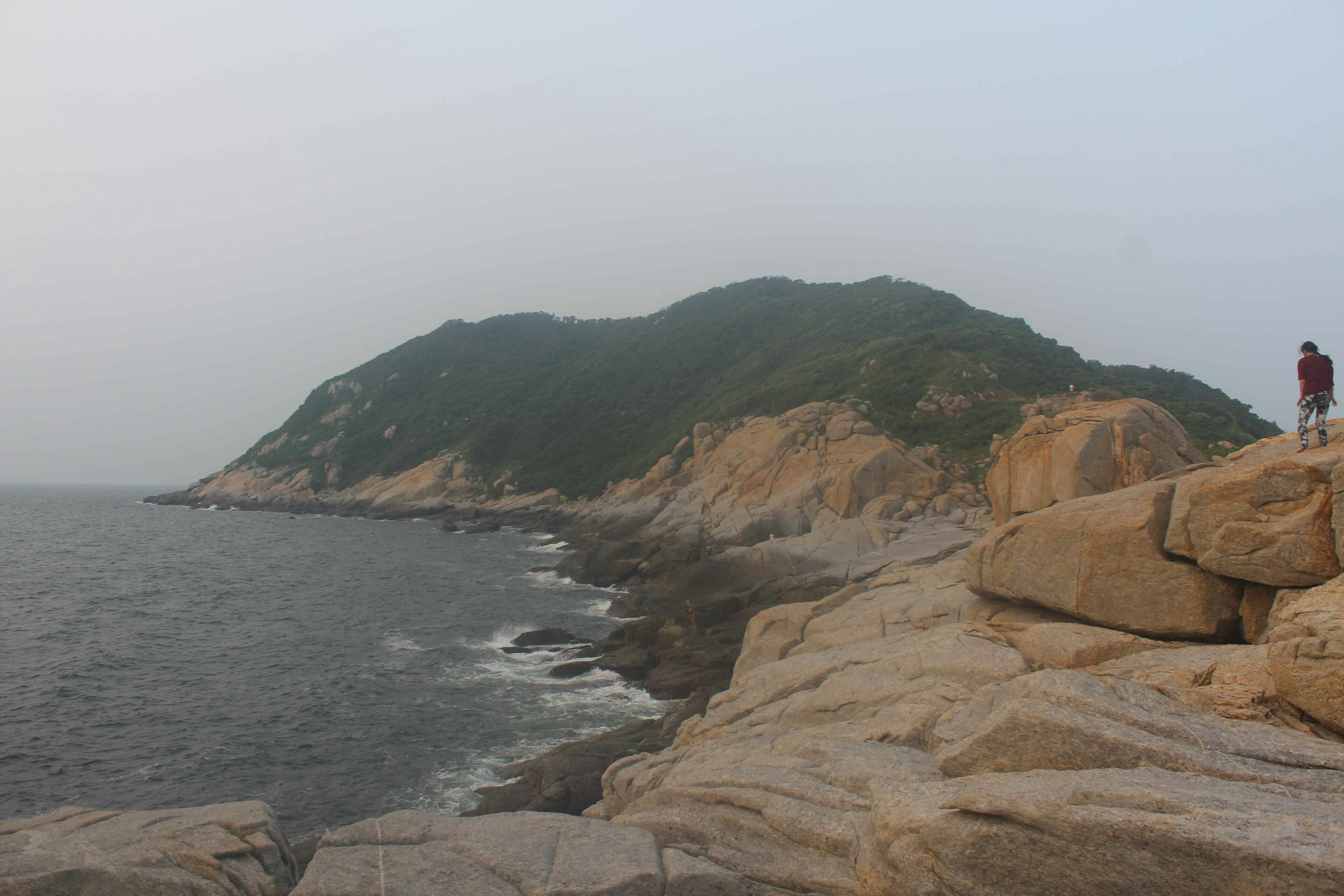
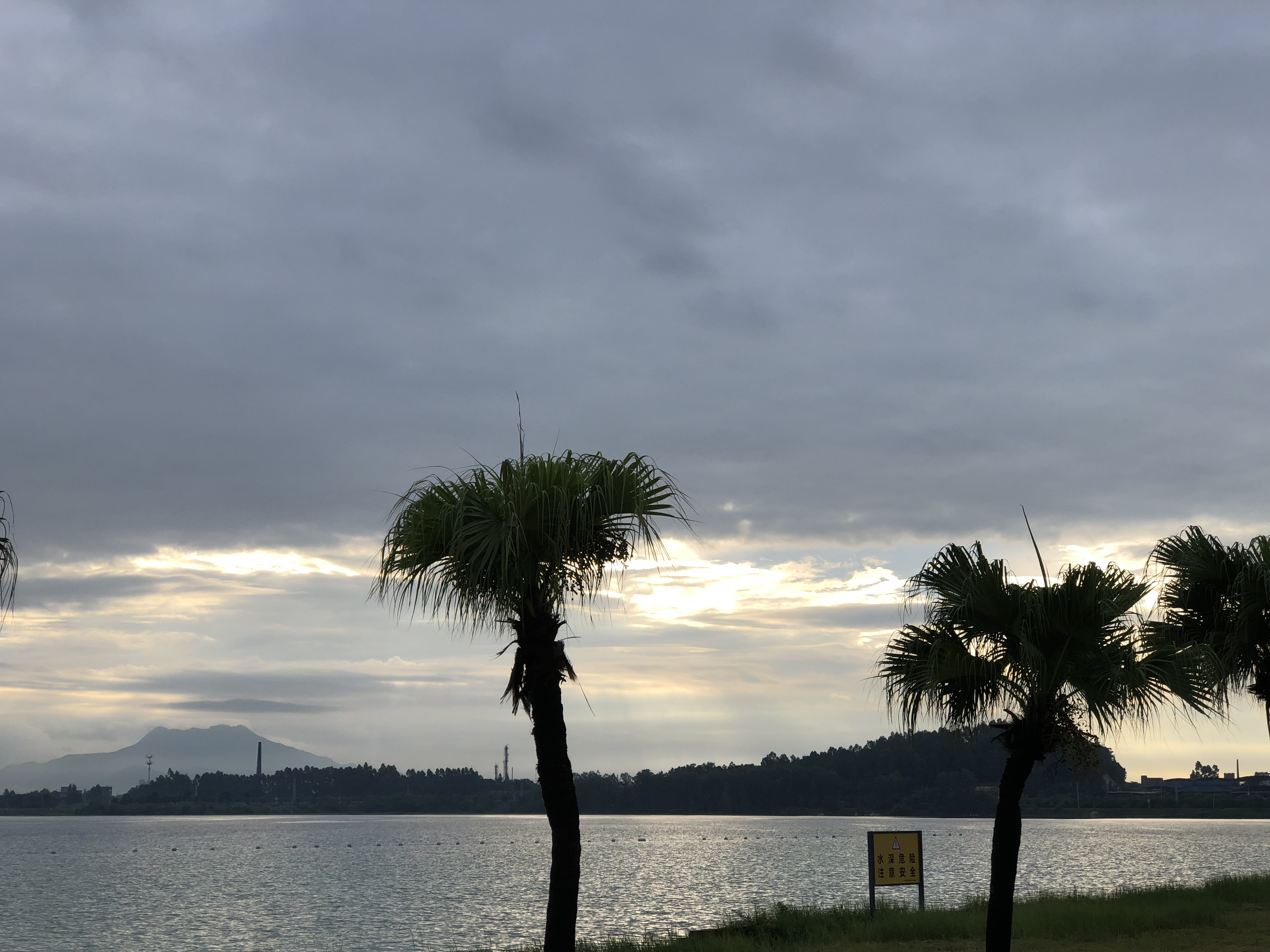
- Skyline of Maoming Maoming International Hotel Maoming Ferris Wheel Yan Jingling Mountain Open-Pit Mine Ecological Park
- Nickname: 南方油城 (Oil City of the South)
- Location of Maoming City jurisdiction in Guangdong
- Interactive map of Maoming
- Location in China
- Coordinates (Maoming municipal government): 21°39′46″N 110°55′32″E
- Country: People's Republic of China
- Province: Guangdong
- Municipal seat: Maonan District

Government
  - CPC Committee Secretary: Liang Yimin
  - Mayor: Li Hongjun (李红军)

Area
  - Prefecture-level city: 11,424.8 km^{2} (4,411.1 sq mi)
  - Urban: 2,714 km^{2} (1,048 sq mi)
  - Metro: 2,714 km^{2} (1,048 sq mi)
- Elevation: 29 m (95 ft)

Population (2020 census)
  - Prefecture-level city: 6,174,050
  - Density: 540.408/km^{2} (1,399.65/sq mi)
  - Urban: 2,539,148
  - Urban density: 935.6/km^{2} (2,423/sq mi)
  - Metro: 2,539,148
  - Metro density: 935.6/km^{2} (2,423/sq mi)
  - Major Nationalities: Han

GDP
  - Prefecture-level city: CN¥ 370 billion US$ 57.3 billion
  - Per capita: CN¥ 59,648; US$ 9,246
- Time zone: UTC+8 (China Standard)
- Postal code: 525000 (Urban center); 525100-525400 (Other areas)
- Area code: 668
- ISO 3166 code: CN-GD-09
- License Plate Prefix: 粤K
- County-level divisions: 6
- Coastline: 220 km (140 mi)
- Website: www.maoming.gov.cn

Maoming
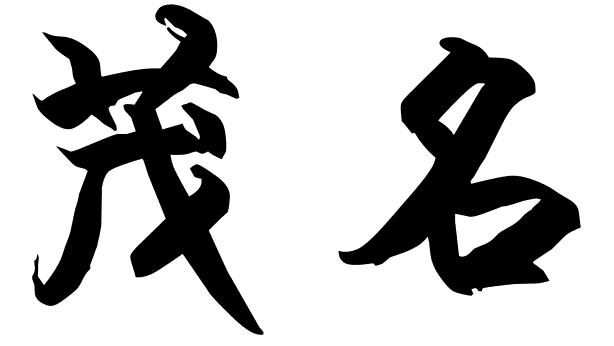
- "Maoming" in Chinese calligraphy
- Chinese: 茂名
- Jyutping: Mau6-ming4
- Cantonese Yale: Mauhmìhng
- Hanyu Pinyin: Màomíng
- Postal: Mowming
- Literal meaning: Named for Pan Maoming
Transcriptions
Standard Mandarin
- Hanyu Pinyin: Màomíng
Yue: Cantonese
- Yale Romanization: Mauhmìhng
- Jyutping: Mau6-ming4

Maoming, alternately romanized as Mowming, (Note: Maoming has also been romanized as Mow-ming and Mow-ming-heën. It was also Romanized in as late as the 1930s in older documents as Kochow.) (Maoming Yue: [mɐu^{22} mɪŋ^{21}]) is a prefecture-level city located in southwestern Guangdong province, China. Facing the South China Sea to the city's south, Maoming borders Zhanjiang to the west, Yangjiang to the east, and Yunfu to the northeast, and is 362 kilometers (225 mi) from the province's capital Guangzhou and 121 kilometers (75 mi) from Zhanjiang. The Maoming Port is a Grade I port that handled 16.8 million tons of cargo in 2007. Refined oil and aquatic products are the major export products from the city. Major export destinations include Hong Kong, Macao and ASEAN member nations.

As of the 2020 census, Maoming had a population of 6,174,050 inhabitants, 2,539,148 of whom live in the built-up (or metro) area, which includes 2 urban districts (Maonan and Dianbai) largely being conurbated. The city's birth rate is 11.04‰, and its GDP (2012) was RMB 195.118 billion (US$31.81billion), up by 10.6% over the previous year. According to government sources, Maoming's GDP ranked 7th among Guangdong's 21 cities, and ranked 79th among China's 656 cities in 2012.

== Etymology ==
The city is named after Jin dynasty Taoist scholar and doctor Pan Maoming (290–371), who was born in Gaozhou. The local area was renamed by imperial decree in honour of Pan in 598 A.D. during the Sui dynasty.

== History ==
During the early development of Chinese civilization in the Wei and Yellow River valleys and across the North China Plain, the area around Maoming was held by the Baiyue. After the Qin invaded in the late 3rd century BC, the area was divided into Nanhai, Xiang, and Guilin. Maoming County was established c. 600 under the Sui. In September 1950, Maoming County was affiliated with the Gaolei Administrative Region. Under the Qing, it comprised part of Gaozhou Prefecture. Following the Chinese Civil War, Maoming became the primary community in the area and was raised to county-level city status in 1959.

In 2014, the city was the site of popular protests against p-Xylene, a chemical based on benzene that was being produced by local industry. Since the 18th Party Congress and the ascension of Party general secretary Xi Jinping, Maoming has been one of the "hardest hit" areas of the anti-corruption campaign. It was seen as a city where buying and selling official positions was rampant. The 2014 investigation by central inspection authorities found that some 159 local officials had taken various forms of bribes. The former Communist Party Secretary of Maoming, Zhou Zhenhong, was sentenced to death with a two-year reprieve for corruption in relation to the p-Xylene scandal. Two other former party secretaries, Liang Yimin and Luo Yinguo, were removed from office and sentenced to prison, respectively.

== Demographics ==
The prefecture includes a large number of minority groups, including the Yao, Zhuang, and Miao, giving it diverse cultural activities and folk arts. The people of southern Maoming speak a Min dialect brought by Putianese immigrants which is especially closely related to the Leizhou dialect while the people of northern Maoming speak the Gaoyang dialect of Cantonese, as well as Mandarin. In addition, Hakka dialect is also spoken by a certain percentage of the Maoming people.

== Administration ==
The prefecture-level city of Maoming administers 5 county-level divisions, including 2 districts and 3 county-level cities.

Map
Name	Simplified Chinese	Hanyu Pinyin	Population (2010 census)	Area (km^{2})	Density (/km^{2})
Maonan District	茂南区	Màonán Qū	820,934	507	1,619.2
Dianbai District	电白区	Diànbái Qū	1,615,505	2,227	725.4
Huazhou	化州市	Huàzhōu Shì	1,178,873	2,354	500.8
Xinyi	信宜市	Xìnyí Shì	913,717	3,081	296.6
Gaozhou	高州市	Gāozhōu Shì	1,288,724	3,276	393.4

- Defunct Maogang District

== Geography ==
Situated in the southwestern coastal area of Guangdong, Maoming has under its jurisdiction Maonan District, Maogang District, Dianbai County. The city administers the smaller cities of Xinyi, Gaozhou, and Huazhou at the county level.

Maoming's coastline is 128.1 kilometers long. The "First Shoal of China" resort is 25 kilometers (16 mi) from downtown Maoming.

== Climate ==
Climate data for Maoming, elevation 34 m (112 ft), (1991–2020 normals, extremes 1981–present)
Month	Jan	Feb	Mar	Apr	May	Jun	Jul	Aug	Sep	Oct	Nov	Dec	Year
Record high °C (°F)	28.9 (84.0)	31.5 (88.7)	32.5 (90.5)	34.3 (93.7)	38.4 (101.1)	37.6 (99.7)	36.9 (98.4)	37.3 (99.1)	36.8 (98.2)	34.4 (93.9)	33.5 (92.3)	29.8 (85.6)	38.4 (101.1)
Mean daily maximum °C (°F)	21.1 (70.0)	22.5 (72.5)	24.5 (76.1)	27.8 (82.0)	31.3 (88.3)	32.5 (90.5)	33.0 (91.4)	32.8 (91.0)	32.2 (90.0)	30.3 (86.5)	27.1 (80.8)	22.8 (73.0)	28.2 (82.7)
Daily mean °C (°F)	15.8 (60.4)	17.8 (64.0)	20.5 (68.9)	23.8 (74.8)	27.0 (80.6)	28.3 (82.9)	28.6 (83.5)	28.2 (82.8)	27.4 (81.3)	25.1 (77.2)	21.7 (71.1)	17.2 (63.0)	23.5 (74.2)
Mean daily minimum °C (°F)	12.4 (54.3)	14.9 (58.8)	17.8 (64.0)	21.2 (70.2)	24.2 (75.6)	25.5 (77.9)	25.7 (78.3)	25.3 (77.5)	24.3 (75.7)	21.4 (70.5)	17.9 (64.2)	13.4 (56.1)	20.3 (68.6)
Record low °C (°F)	2.6 (36.7)	4.0 (39.2)	4.9 (40.8)	11.2 (52.2)	16.1 (61.0)	18.9 (66.0)	22.1 (71.8)	22.3 (72.1)	17.3 (63.1)	13.7 (56.7)	6.1 (43.0)	3.5 (38.3)	2.6 (36.7)
Average precipitation mm (inches)	43.3 (1.70)	39.5 (1.56)	60.4 (2.38)	141.2 (5.56)	214.3 (8.44)	299.8 (11.80)	308 (12.1)	302.4 (11.91)	201.2 (7.92)	71.6 (2.82)	33.1 (1.30)	37.1 (1.46)	1,751.9 (68.95)
Average precipitation days (≥ 0.1 mm)	6.5	8.0	10.2	11.7	15.7	17.7	17.4	19.1	14.2	6.1	5.2	5.2	137
Average relative humidity (%)	76	80	83	84	84	85	83	84	81	74	73	72	80
Mean monthly sunshine hours	116.2	86.8	73.6	99.3	156.5	160.6	195.2	183.4	176.6	197.3	165.2	143.5	1,754.2
Percentage possible sunshine	34	27	20	26	38	40	47	46	49	55	50	43	40
Source: China Meteorological Administrationall-time record lowall-time Jun high

== Economy ==
Maoming was called one of "the top 100 developed cities in China" and the "National Garden City". Maoming is one of the largest petrochemical production areas in South China, and one of the largest fruit production areas. Other major industries include tilapia culture and processing, winter-planted vegetable production, and other energy, material, and heavy-chemical industrial production.

Major Economic indicators (2012)

GDP: RMB 195.118 billion (US$31.81 million), 10.6% up

GDP Composition:

- Primary Industry (Agriculture) 19.1%
- Secondary Industry (Industry & Construction) 37.2%
- Tertiary Industry(Service) 43,7%

GDP Per Capita: RMB 33,537(US$5467.93), 8.9% up

Unemployment Rate: 2.5%

Fixed Asset Investment: RMB 18.01 billion (US$2,64 billion), 23.5% up

Utilized FDI: US$31 million, 44.2% down

Total Import & Export: US$673 million, 9.1% down

Export: US$532 million, 7.4% up

Import: US$141 million, 42.5% down

Sales of Consumer Goods: RMB 60.1 billion (US$8.8 billion), 20.3% up

=== Environmental issues ===
In March 2014, local people staged a protest over the production of paraxylene, a chemical used to make fabrics and plastic bottles at a plant run by the local government and state-owned Sinopec, China's biggest refiner.

== Transport ==
=== Highway ===
Maoming can be reached by the Maozhan Expressway, which is linked to the Kaiyang Expressway and Fokai Expressway, which leads to the provincial capital, Guangzhou. Guangzhou is a 5 - 6 hour commute from Maoming.

=== Railway ===
Maoming is served by the Guangzhou-Maoming Railway, which runs east to the provincial capital, the Hechun-Maoming Railway, which runs west to the Litang-Zhanjiang Railway, and the Luoyang–Zhanjiang Railway, which runs north through eastern Guangxi and central Hunan to China's Central Plain.

== Tourist attractions ==
Maoming is home to the No. 1 Shoal of China Vacation Area (中国第一滩), Chicken Island (Guangdong) (放鸡岛) and Tianmashan (天马山) Eco-tourist Area, the Temple of Madam Xian (冼太庙; Xiǎn Tài Miào) in Gaozhou, and the Genzi Litchi Cultural Tourist Area.

The No.1 Shoal of China Vacation Area is 25 kilometers (16 mi) from the downtown Maoming, in the Maogang District. With miles of fine beach outside the shelter belt, tourists can enjoy parachute gliding and sailboarding. It is also a national training center for beach volleyball, and often hosts national and international competitions.

Chicken Island is the largest island in Maoming, covering an area of 1.9 km^{2}. This tourist resort is a diving center, boasting clear and pristine sea water. It is known for its coral reefs and recreational scuba diving. Skin diving, deep diving, and explorational diving are available as well.

The Temple of Madam Xian was constructed in 1535 in memory of Madam Xian, who was the female leader of the Baiyue Tribe. The temple is rich in cultural and historical objects, such as ancient statues, sculptures, and stone inscriptions.

Maoming is a famous litchi production area. The Genzi Litchi Cultural Tourist Area is situated in Genzi, a small town in Maoming.

Maoming's most popular local specialty foods include Huazhou Baiqie Chicken (白切鸡), Gaozhou Salted Chicken (盐焗鸡 yánjú jī), Fenpi (粉皮), Genzi Beef Rice Noodles and Xinyi Huaixiang Chicken.

Maoming is accessible from Guangzhou (approximately four hours by train or a first class bus). Two train stations serve Maoming, one downtown that provides the connection to Guangzhou and points to the north, and one a few minutes south of town that connects to the south and west.

== Notable people ==
- Jiang, Mao Shen (江茂森), born in 1901, and died in 1982. Historian, also a senior member of Chinese Nationalist Party (KMT)
- Wong Sun (黃新): born in 1926, and died in November 1999, Wong was a male actor of Hong Kong television broadcasting company (TVB)
- Chiu, Miu Ling (招妙玲), Hong Kong actress, she has a nickname: big sound woman (大聲婆), Chiu died around 2013.
- Cheng, Siu Ping (鄭少萍): Hong Kong actress, Cheng migrated to USA around the 1990s.
