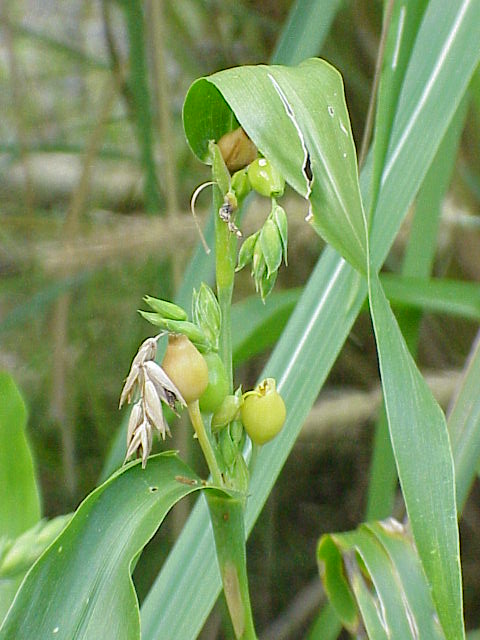
- Inflorescences

Scientific classification
- Kingdom: Plantae
- Clade: Tracheophytes
- Clade: Angiosperms
- Clade: Monocots
- Clade: Commelinids
- Order: Poales
- Family: Poaceae
- Subfamily: Panicoideae
- Genus: Coix
- Species: C. lacryma-jobi

Binomial name
- Coix lacryma-jobi L.

Synonyms
- Coix agrestis Lour.; Coix arundinacea Lam.; Coix chinensis Tod.; Coix chinensis Tod. ex Balansa nom. illeg.; Coix exaltata Jacq. ex Spreng.; Coix gigantea J.Jacq. nom. illeg.; Coix lacryma L. nom. illeg.; Coix ma-yuen Rom.Caill.; Coix ouwehandii Koord.; Coix ovata Stokes nom. illeg.; Coix palustris Koord.; Coix pendula Salisb. nom. illeg.; Coix pumila Roxb.; Coix stenocarpa (Oliv.) Balansa; Coix stigmatosa K.Koch & Bouché; Coix tubulosa Hack.; Lithagrostis lacryma-jobi (L.) Gaertn.; Sphaerium lacryma (L.) Kuntze nom. illeg.; Sphaerium tubulosum (Warb.) Kuntze

= Job's tears =

Species of plant

Job's tears /dʒoʊbz/ (Coix lacryma-jobi), also known as adlay or adlay millet, is a tall grain-bearing perennial tropical plant of the family Poaceae (grass family). It is native to Southeast Asia and introduced to Northern China and India in remote antiquity, and elsewhere cultivated in gardens as an annual. It has been naturalized in the southern United States and the New World tropics. In its native environment it is grown at higher elevation areas where rice and corn do not grow well. Job's tears are also commonly sold as Chinese pearl barley, though true barley belongs to a completely different genus.

There are two main varieties of the species, one wild and one cultivated. The wild variety, Coix lacryma-jobi var. lacryma-jobi, has hard-shelled pseudocarps—very hard, pearly white, oval structures used as beads for making prayer beads or rosaries, necklaces, and other objects. The cultivated variety Coix lacryma-jobi var. ma-yuen is harvested as a cereal crop, has a soft shell, and is used in traditional medicine in parts of Asia.

== Nomenclature ==
Job's tears may also be referred to under different spellings (Job's-tears, Jobs-tears). The crop is also known by other common names in English, such as adlay or adlay millet. Other common names in English include coix seed, gromwell grass, and tear grass.

The seeds are known in Hindi as Vaijanti (वैजंती), Baijanti (बैजंती) or Vaijayanti (वैजयंती), in Chinese as yìyǐ rén (薏苡仁), where rén means "kernel", and also described in Latin as semen coicis or semen coicis lachryma-jobi in pharmacopoeic literature.

== Taxonomy ==
The species, native to Southeast Asia, was named by Carl Linnaeus in 1753 with the epithet as a Latin translation of the metaphorical tear of Job. As of February 2015, four varieties are accepted by the World Checklist of Selected Plant Families:

- Coix lacryma-jobi var. lacryma-jobi

Widely distributed throughout the Indian subcontinent to peninsular Malaysia and Taiwan; naturalized elsewhere. The involucres are ovoid, bony and glossy. It has hard shells and is used as beads in crafts.

- Coix lacryma-jobi var. ma-yuen (Rom.Caill.) Stapf

South China to peninsular Malaysia and the Philippines.
The varietal name is eponymous after General Ma Yuen or Ma Yuan (馬援) who according to legend learned of the plant's use when he was posted in Cochin China (or Tonkin, in what is now Vietnam), and brought the seeds back to China to be cultivated. The involucres are elliptical, striate and soft.

- Coix lacryma-jobi var. puellarum (Balansa) A.Camus

Assam to Yunnan (China) and Indochina. It is the smallest among the Indian species, with only 4mm in diameter of the seeds. It is used for ornament as well.

- Coix lacryma-jobi var. stenocarpa Oliv.

Eastern Himalayas to Indochina.

Job's tears—along with Coix in —was formerly placed in the Maydeae, now known to be polyphyletic. (Note: p. 331, "Maize and Tripsacum were previously grouped with a number of other grasses that have monoecious flowering patterns — the most widely known being Job's tears (Coix lacryma-jobi) — into the Maydeae (74); however, molecular data revealed that this grouping was polyphyletic (61).") It has cylindrical, longer than broad involucres. It is widely used as beads for ornaments.

== Morphology ==
Job's tear is a monoecious grass which is broad-leaved, loose-growing, branched and robust. It can reach a height between 1.20 m to 1.80 m. Like all members of the genus, their inflorescences develop from a leaf sheath at the end of the stem and consist partly of hard, globular or oval, hollow, bead-like structures. Job's tear seeds differ in color, with the more soft-shelled seeds being light brown and the hard-shelled forms having a dark red pericarp.

The hardened "shells" covering the seeds are technically the fruit-case or involucre (hardened bract), with the bract also referred to as "capsule-spathe" or "sheathing bract" by some past botanical works.

These shells cover the bases of the flowers (inflorescences) which are male and female racemes/panicles; the male racemes project upright and consist of overlapping scale-like spikelets, with yellow stamens that pop out in-between, and there are one or two yarn-like stigmas drooping from the base.

== Proteins ==
Job's tears – as with Coix in general – produces its own variety of α-zein prolamins. These prolamins have undergone unusually rapid evolutionary divergence from closely related grasses, by way of copy-number changes. (Note: p. 335, "Clusters of locally duplicated genes can also expand and contract rapidly, as shown by investigation of the 22-kDa α zein gene families in maize, sorghum, and coix, which appear to have experienced independent copy-number amplifications since the divergence of these three species (107).")

== History ==
Job's tears is native to Southeast Asian countries, namely India, Myanmar, China, and Malaysia. Residue on pottery from a Neolithic (late Yangshao Culture) site in north-central China (Note: in Mijaya (米家崖) village, Shaanxi Province.) shows that Job's tears, together with non-native barley and other plants were used to brew beer as early as ca. 3000 BC. (Note: The finds occurred in a Banpo IV type stratum which was dated to 3400–2900 BC, which the scholars place in the late Yangshao period (Yangshao Period defined as 5000–2900 BC).)

Job's tears were already introduced to Japan (and probably cultivated alongside rice) in the Early Jōmon Period, corroborated by finds in Western Japan (Chūgoku region), e.g., from studies of phytoliths in the Asanebana Shell Midden (朝寝鼻貝塚) (ca. 4000 BC) in Okayama Prefecture. (Note: Takahashi, Mamoru 高橋護 (1999). "Kōkogaku to puranto-opāru bunseki no riyō 考古学とプラント・オパール分析の利用 [Archaeology and the use of phytolith analysis]", Sudien ato / hatake ato wo meguru shizen kagaku--sono kenshō to saibai shokubutsu 水田跡・畑跡をめぐる自然科学―その検証と栽培植物- [Natural sciences concerning rice paddy sites/field sites: assessment and planted flora]. The 9th Congress of the Higashi nihono no suiden ato wo kangaeru kai.年) And further east in Japan, the plant has been found at the Toro site, Shizuoka Prefecture dating to the Yayoi Period.

Remains of Job's tears have been found in archaeological sites in northeastern India, dating to around 1000 BC. It was introduced to the subtropical area in India from the east Himalayan belt. A number of scholars support the view it has been in cultivation in India in the 2000–1000 BC period. The wild varieties have hard-coated seeds. Job's tear was one of the earliest domesticated crops. Domestication makes the seed coat become softer and easier to cook.

In China, the current cultivation of Job's tears mainly occurs in Fujian, Jiangsu, Hebei, and Liaoning provinces. The cultivation of Job's tears spreads out to temperate areas in North and Northeast China. The shelled grains exported from China were erroneously declared through customs as "pearl barley", and "Chinese pearl barley" remains an alternate common name so that the grains are sold under such label in Asian supermarkets, even though C. lacryma-jobi is not closely related to barley (Hordeum vulgare).

The name "Job's tears" is a calque of Arabic دموع أيوب (dumūʿ ʾAyyūb), the name used by Arab merchants who introduced the plant to Europe in the Middle Ages. They used the pseudocarps for misbaha (prayer beads) and associated them with the account of the suffering of Job (Ayyub) in the Quran, which is derived from the portrayal of Job in the Hebrew Bible's Book of Job.

== Uses ==
=== Crafts ===
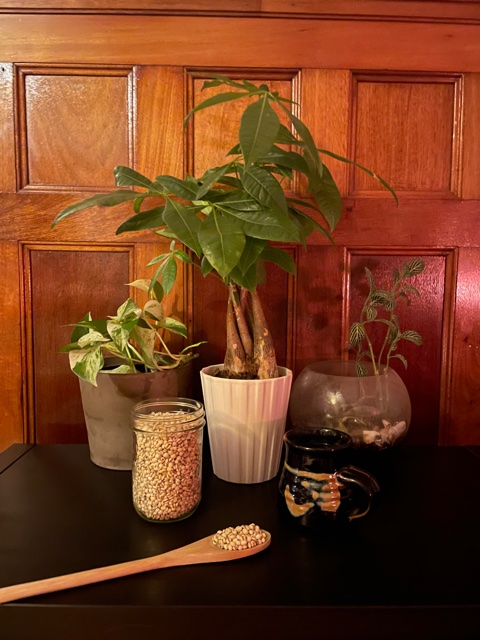
Job's Tears used for traditional medicine.

The hard, white grains of Job's tears have historically been used as beads to make necklaces and other objects. The seeds are naturally bored with holes without the need to artificially puncture them.

Strands of Job's tears are used as Buddhist prayer beads in parts of India, Myanmar, Laos, Taiwan, and Korea according to Japanese researcher Yukino Ochiai who has specialized on the ethnobotanic usage of the plant. They are also made into rosaries in countries such as the Philippines and Bolivia.

==== East Asia ====
===== Japan =====
In Japan, the grains growing wild are called juzudama (数珠玉) ‘Buddhist rosary beads’), and children have made playthings out of them by stringing them into necklaces. However, juzu-dama was a corruption of zuzu-dama according to folklorist Kunio Yanagita. A type of Buddhist rosary called irataka no juzu, which were hand-made by the yamabushi ascetics practicing shugendō training, purportedly used a large-grain type known as oni-juzudama (鬼数珠玉) ‘oni(ogre) rosary beads’. Although this was published as a separate variety, C. lacryma jobi var. maxima Makino, it is now regarded as synonymous to C. lacryma jobi var. lacryma-jobi according to taxonomical databases (World Checklist of Selected Plant Families).

It was contended by Edo Period scholar Ono Ranzan that the soft-shelled edible type called shikoku-mugi was not introduced into Japan until the Kyōho era (1716–1736), as opposed to a hard-shelled edible type called chōsen-mugi (lit. ‘Korean wheat’) which needed to be beaten in order to crack and thresh them. (Note: Ranzan actually gave this type under tōmugi alias chōsen-mugi, but this is confusing, since later writers such as Mizumasa Furukawa (1928–1977) wrote that shikoku-mugi and tōmugi were the same.) This type has been published as a separate species, C. agrestis in the past, but this is now recognized also as a synonym of C. lacryma jobi var. lacryma-jobi. (Note: Researcher Seiji Koyama identifies the chōsen-mugi (‘Korean wheat’) as C. lacryma jobi var. koreana, but that variety name is not registered at the WCSPF.) Thus Japanese consumption of the crop attested in pre-Kyōho literature presumably used this hard-shelled type in the recipe. (Note: Koyama gives several examples, including the Nōgyō zensho (Genroku 10 or 1697), which states Job's tears (yokui) can be eaten as gruel, or as blended grain in cooked rice, or as dumplings (dango). The recipe for the okoshi-gome snack in the Ryōri monogatari (Kaei 20, 1643) does not use rice but roasted cracked grains of job's tears (yokuinin) instead, mixed with sugar and molded into shape.)

Yanagita contended that the use of the beads predated the introduction of Buddhism into Japan (552/538 CE). (Note: §3: "後に東北のイタコの数珠や、アイヌの頸飾くびかざりなどを見るようになって、ジュズとは呼びながらも我々の真似ていたのは、もっと古風な、また国風なものだったことに心づいたことである。 Later [as an adult] I saw the bead-necklaces of the itako shamanesses and the Ainu necklaces, and realized that what we were pretend-playing with [as children] were, even though we called them juzu [like Buddhist rosaries], much older and more native to the land.") And the plant has not only been found at sites dating to approximately this period at the Kuroimine Site, but in Jomon period sites dating to several millennia BC.

===== Ocean Road hypothesis =====
Yanagita in his Ocean Road hypothesis argues that the pearly glistening seeds were regarded as simulating or substituting for cowrie shells, which were used as ornaments and currency throughout Southern China and Southeast Asia in antiquity, and he argued both items to be part of cultural transmission into Japan from these areas. (Note: He posited that the name of the seeds (variant name tsushi-dama or tsushi-tama) was rooted in the ancient word tsushiya whose precise meaning he deduced to be 'cowries'. However this was guesswork "founded on really the faintest clue 誠に幽な暗示の上に築かれている", and he admitted there is no attestation to tsushiya or words similar used in the sense of ‘jewel shells’in any ancient texts.)

Later scholars have pursued the validity of the thesis. Yanagita had reproduced a distribution map of the usage of ornamental cowries throughout Asia (compiled by J. Wilfrid Jackson), and Japanese ethnologist Keiji Iwata alluded to a need for a distribution map of ornamental Job's tears, for making comparison therewith.

==== Mainland Southeast Asia ====
===== Thailand and Myanmar =====
The Akha people and the Karen people who live in the mountainous regions around the Thai-Myanmar border grow several varieties of the plant and use the beads to ornament various handicraft. (Note: The Akha people are also found in Yunnan Province in China, but Ochiai (2010) only speaks of usage in "the south side of China" (p. 6), and exhibits a photo of Yunnan Province bead necklace on the map (pp. 4–5) without identifying the ethnic group.) The beads are used strictly only on women's apparel among the Akha, sewn onto headwear, jackets, handbags, etc.; also, a variety of shapes of beads are used. (Note: It has been noted that the Akha use cowries shells as ornaments also, even though they are a mountainous people. The shells from Bangkok were being obtained through Overseas Chinese middlemen.) The beads are used only on the jackets of married women among the Karen, and the oblong seeds are exclusively selected, some example has been shown from the Karen in Chiang Rai Province of Thailand.

Strands of job's tears necklaces have also been collected from Chiang Rai Province, Thailand and it is known the Karen people string the beads into necklaces, such necklaces in use also in the former Karenni States (current Kayah State of Burma), with the crop being known by the name cheik (var. kyeik, kayeik, kyeit) in Burmese. Job's tears necklace has been collected also from Yunnan Province, China, which has a population of Akha-Hani people and other minorities, but the Wa people of Yunnan also used the plant seeds (tɛ kao; lit. ‘fruit-Coix’) sewn onto fabrics and bags, etc.

The Wa people and other minorities like the Taungyo ethnic group use the beads in apparel in Shan State, Myanmar.

==== Insular Southeast Asia ====
===== Borneo =====
Various indigenous Bornean tribes such as the Kelabit people of Sarawak state (and North Kalimantan, Indonesia), the Kadazandusun people and Murut people of Sabah state all use the plant beads as ornament. In the Kadazandusun language, the plant is called dalai. The Kayan of Borneo also use job's tears to decorate clothing and war dress.

===== Philippines =====
Job's tears (Tagalog: tigbí) are otherwise known by many local names in the Philippines (e.g. Bikol: adlái in Visaya Islands). The beads strung together have sometimes been used as rosaries, or made into bead curtains (e.g. the Tboli people on Mindanao), or woven into baskets and other vessels.

==== Americas ====
The plant was known as calandula in Spanish, and the hards seeds were strung together as beads or into rosaries in parts of New Spain, e.g., Puerto Rico.

In both the Eastern Band of Cherokee Indians and the Cherokee Nation in Oklahoma, the beads of Job's tears are called "corn beads" or "Cherokee corn beads" and have been used for personal adornment.

=== Food ===
Throughout East Asia, Job's tears are available in dried form and cooked as a grain. Job's tears grains are widely eaten as a cereal. The cultivated varieties are soft-shelled, and can be easily cooked into gruels, etc. Among the Zomi in Southeast Asia, miim festival (Job's tears festival) was held annually to pay tribute to the departed souls.

Some of the soft-shelled types are easily threshed, producing sweet kernels. The threshed (and polished) "kernels" or ren (Chinese: 薏苡仁; pinyin: yiyi ren; Wade–Giles: i i jen) are used in traditional Chinese Medicine (see infra). (Note: Although this stringent distinction may not be followed in literature, for example, yi yi ren may be used as the term for the fruit overall rather than the polished endosperm.)

The threshed grains are generally spherical, with a groove on one end, and polished white in color. In Japan unpolished grains are also sold, and marketed as yūki hatomugi (‘organic job's tears’).

In Cambodia, where it is known as skuay (ស្គួយ), the seeds are not much used as a grain, but used as part of herbal medicine and as an ingredient in desserts. In Thailand, it is often consumed in teas and other drinks, such as soy milk.

It is also a minor cereal crop and fodder in Northeastern India.

The grains of Job's tear can be used the same way as rice. It can be eaten cooked or even raw, as it has a slightly sweet taste. Further, the grains can be used for the production of flour. Job's tear grains can be processed in the same machine as rice. For the soft hulls, it is enough to press them over a sieve. The advantage of Job's tear over rice is that the grains do not need to be polished, as is the case with rice. Through this process, the rice loses its vitamins. This makes Job's tear a valuable food for undernourished populations in rural areas.

=== Beverages and soups ===
In Korean cuisine, a thick drink called yulmu cha (율무차, literally "Job's tears tea") is made from powdered Job's tears. A similar drink, called yi ren jiang (薏仁漿), also appears in Chinese cuisine, and is made by simmering whole polished Job's tears in water and sweetening the resulting thin, cloudy liquid with sugar. The grains are usually strained from the liquid but may also be consumed separately or together.

In Japan, the roasted kernels are brewed into hatomugi cha (ハトムギ茶), literally a "tea". This is drunk for medicinal value and not for enjoyment, as it does not suit the average consumer's taste, but a more palatable brew is obtained by roasting seeds that have been germinated, which reduces the distinctive strong odor. (Note: It is unclear what is meant by the coffee-like drink brewed from roasted seeds that is distinguished from the "tea" which some sources describe but do not specify by any name. The hatomugi kōhī ("jobs tears coffee") apparently refers to coffee dripped with hatomugi tea instead of plain hot water.)

In southern China, Job's tears are often used in tong sui (糖水), a sweet dessert soup. One variety is called ching bo leung in Cantonese (Chinese: 清補涼; pinyin: qing bu liang), and is also known as sâm bổ lượng in Vietnamese cuisine. There is also a braised chicken dish yimidunji (Chinese: 薏米炖鸡=薏米燉鷄).

=== Alcoholic beverages ===
In both Korea and China, distilled liquors are also made from the grain. One Korean liquor is called okroju (옥로주; hanja: 玉露酒), which is made from rice and Job's tears. The grains are also brewed into beers in northeast India and other parts of southeast Asia.

=== Traditional medicine ===
Job's tears are used with other herbs in traditional Chinese medicine or folk medicine. In Panama, Argentina, Brazil, Colombia, and Cuba, Job's tears was used in traditional medicine as a decoction of the seeds, leaves, and roots.

The plant is noted in an ancient medical text Huangdi Neijing (5th–2nd centuries BCE) attributed to the legendary Huangdi (Yellow Emperor), but fails to be noticed in the standard traditional materia medica reference Bencao Gangmu (本草綱目)(16c.).

== Cultivation requirements ==
=== Soil and climate requirement ===
It is generally grown in sunny, fertile, well-drained fields with sandy loam soil. Adlay likes mild, cool and humid climate. It does not adapt to hot and muggy climate, has low cold tolerance, and is very intolerant of drought. Black-shelled adlay is suitable for planting in areas with altitudes of 800 to 1,000 m; dwarf adlay varieties are suitable for planting in low altitude areas.

=== Seedbed requirements and sowing ===
Soaking seeds with disinfectant has a positive influence on germination rate.

Planting can be done when the ground temperature is above 12 °C. And if it is not frost, sowing should be done as early as possible to lengthen the required days to emergence and days to anthesis. Adlay sowing is divided into strip sowing and hole sowing. The strip sowing refers to the uniform sowing of seeds in trenches with a spacing of about 50 cm and a depth of 4–5 cm. Hole sowing refers to sowing seeds in holes 3–5 cm deep, with 3-4 seeds per hole.

=== Cultivation management ===
Control the number of seedlings per hole when the seedlings have 3–4 true leaves, and leave 2–3 well-grown plants in each hole.

Tillage at least 3 times during the whole crop growth. The 1st tillage is to be done when the seedlings are 5–10 cm high and needs to be cleaned of weeds to promote tillering. The second tillage is done when the seedlings are 15–20 cm high. The third plowing is done when the seedlings are 30 cm high, combined with fertilizer and soil cultivation to promote root growth and prevent collapse.

== Production ==
=== Growth and development ===
It is an annual crop but it can be a perennial when allowed to develop ratoon. Adlay is propagated by seeds at the start of rain. The germination occurs as early as 7 days after sowing. It takes 5 to 5.5 months to flower and mature. The average height can reach over 90 cm at harvest. The application of N fertilizer can significantly improve the yield of adlay.

Drought is a major stress for adlay growth and development. The lack of moisture will cause impaired germination and poor establishment. During the growth and maturation stage, water deficits will reduce the leaf area index and lead to barrenness, which negatively affects photosynthesis and dry matter production.

=== Harvest and post-harvest operations ===
When nearly 80% of adlay grains turn brown, the panicle will be harvested by cutting the stems and leaving three nodes above the ground. The harvest period varies with the different varieties and local environment. Because of the uneven height and grain distribution, the use of machines for harvesting is limited and harvesting has been done by hand in many regions in Southeastern Asia. Then the harvested panicles are threshed by hand or using a treadle thresher. For manual threshing, it is normally used when the harvested grains are at lower moisture content and easily shatter. Threshed grains are sun dried or placed in drying facilities where they utilize forced warm air to gradually reduce the moisture content to 14% suited to storage before the adlay moves to the milling process. The adlay can be consumed as grains and flour after being milled through corn and rice mill. The milling recovery is about 60% depending on the cultivars.

The yield is harvested in early October and is easily influenced by the weather. If there is dry and hot wind in the initial phase, the pollen loses its vitality, therefore can't be pollinated. This leads to hollow seeds, which results in yield reduction in light cultivars and zero yield in heavy cultivars. Early maturing varieties are sown in early March, middle maturing varieties are sown from late March to early April, and late maturing varieties are sown from late April to early May. Sowing should be early rather than late. If sowing is too late, it will affect the yield and even the seeds can not mature after autumn.

== Nutritional value ==
The seeds of Job's tears contain protein, dietary fibre, zinc, and calcium, among other micronutrients.

Nutrients	Percentage by mass
Carbohydrates	65%
Protein	14%
Fat	5%
Crude fiber	3%
Calcium	0.07%
Phosphorus	0.242%
Iron	0.001%

Job's tears contain starch (58%). The seeds are used as ingredients to make soup, porridge, flour and pastries. Two major methods to isolate starch include steeping in an alkaline solution or with sodium metabisulfite (Na_{2}S_{2}O_{5}).

Job's tears contain mostly unsaturated fatty acids, including oleic acid, linoleic acid, palmitic acid, and stearic acid, which can be extracted using solvent processes, supercritical fluid extraction or ultrasonic-assisted extraction.

== Pests ==
Job's tear is less subject to attacks of locusts than rice and corn. Insect pests include:

- stem borers Sesamia inferens and Ostrinia furnacalis
- rice skipper Pelopidas mathias (leaf feeder)
- thrip Chaetanaphothrips orchidii
- aphid Rhopalosiphum maidis
- woolly aphid Ceratovacuna lanigera

It is susceptible to leaf blight.

== Gallery ==
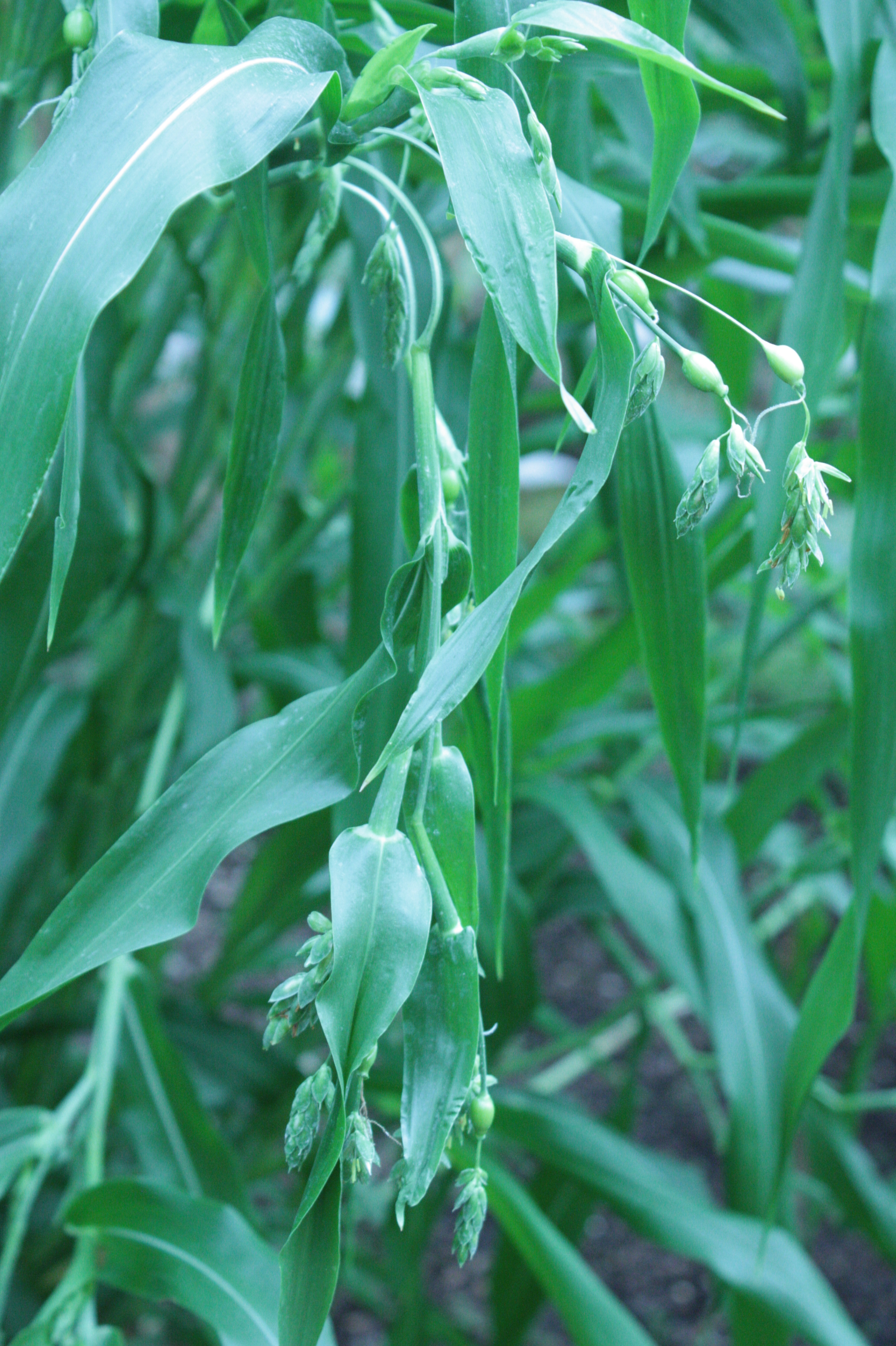
An unripened head of Job's Tears

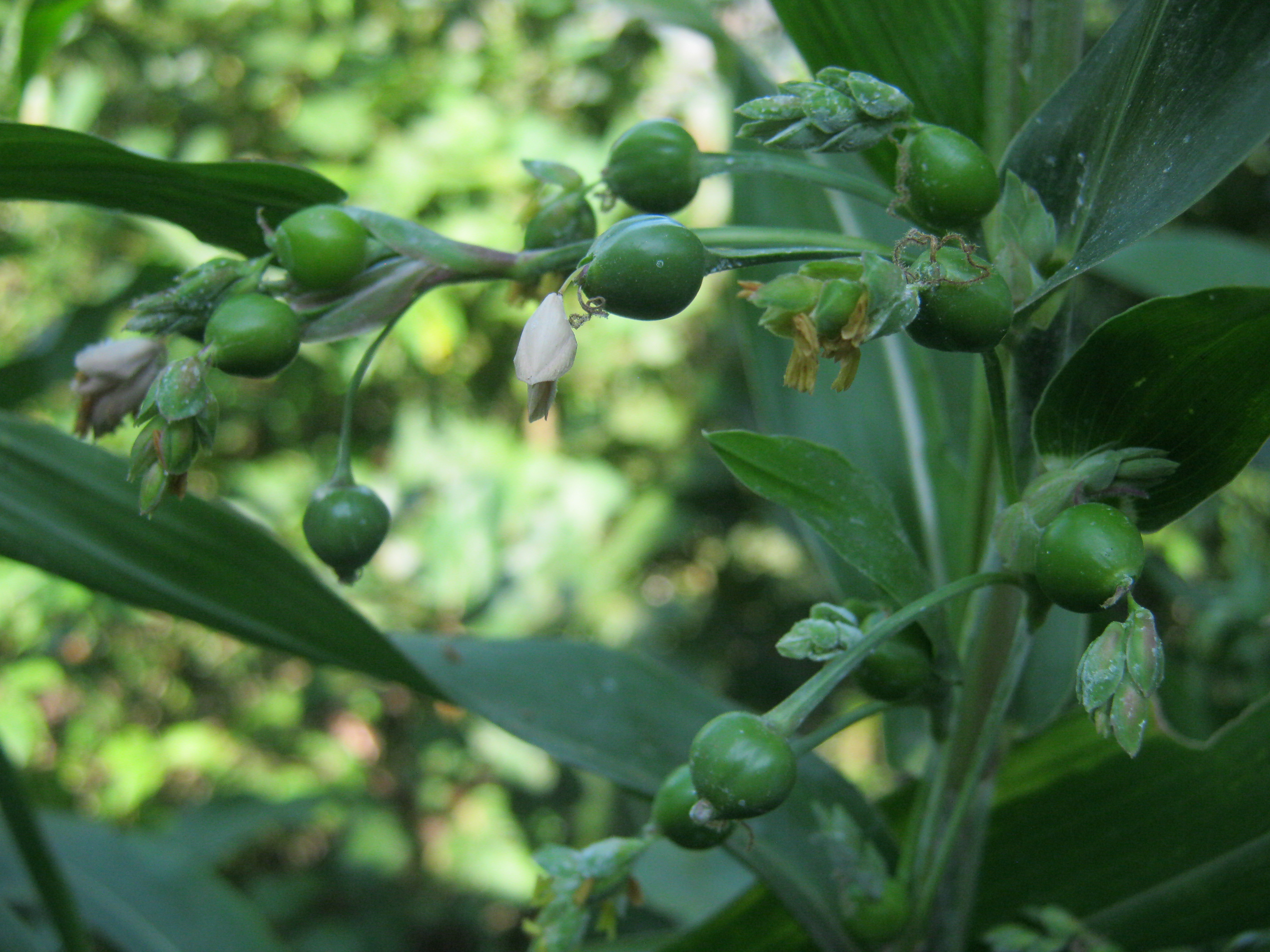
C. lacryma-jobi plant with flowers and fruit in Nepal

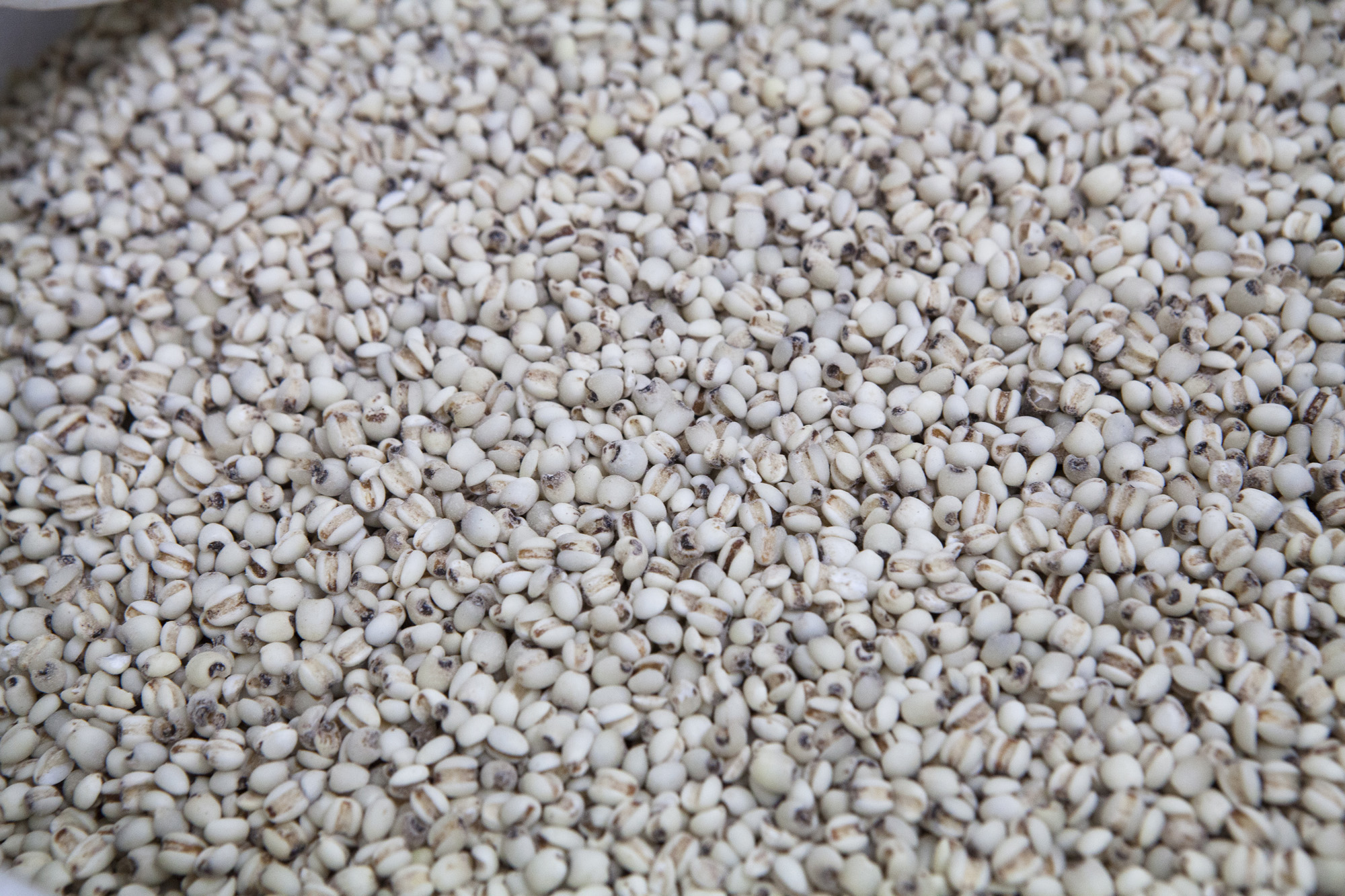
Job's tears grains

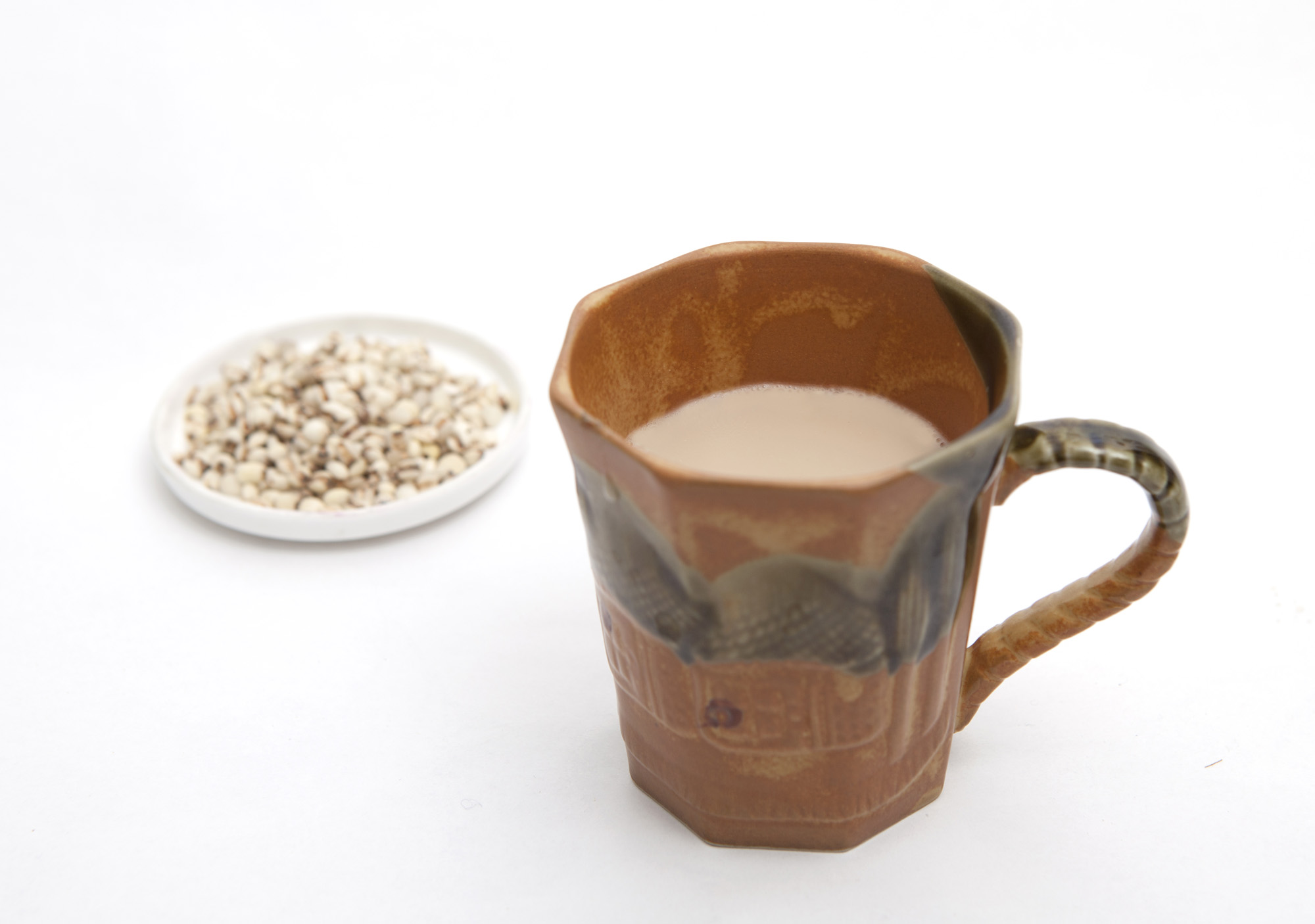
Yulmu-cha (Job's tears tea) from Korea

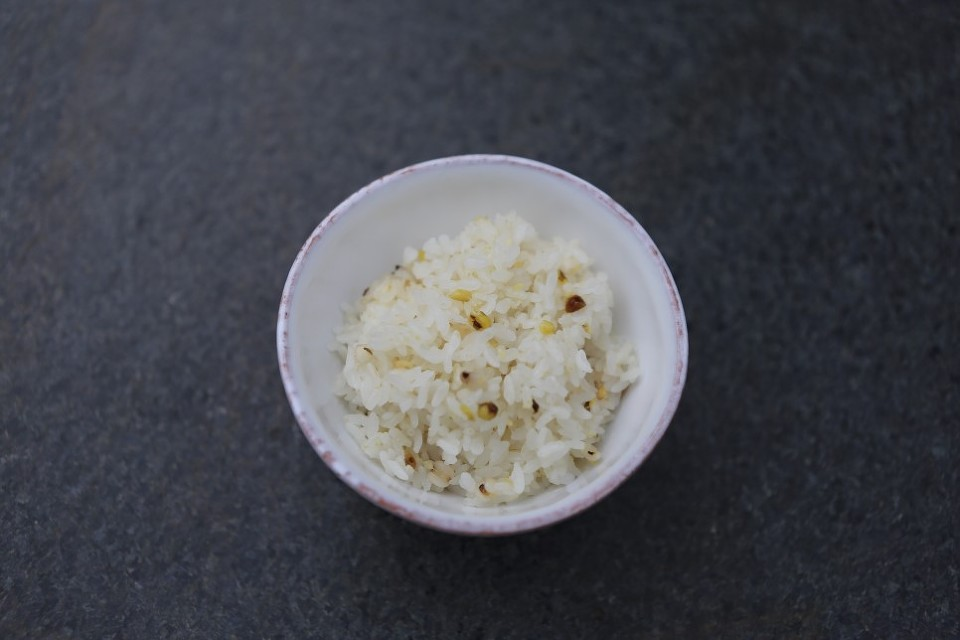
Yulmu-bap (Job's tears rice) from Korea

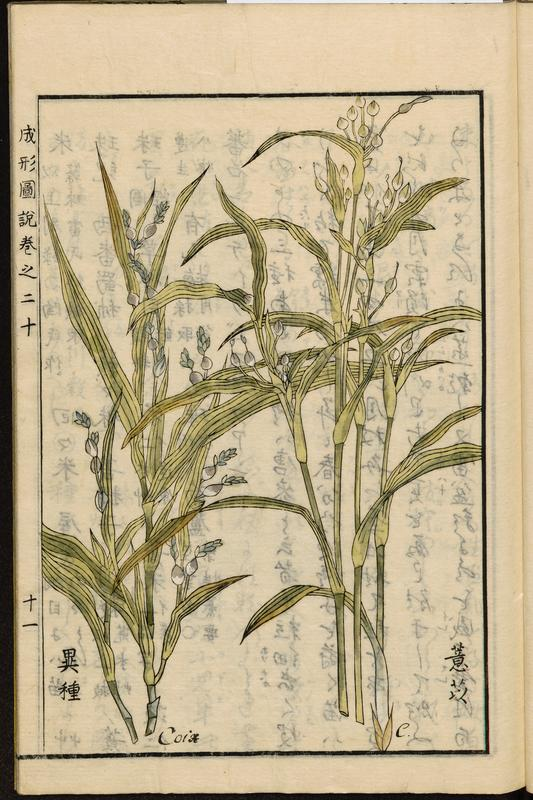
Illustration of Coix lacryma-jobi from the Japanese encyclopedia Seikei Zusetsu (1804)

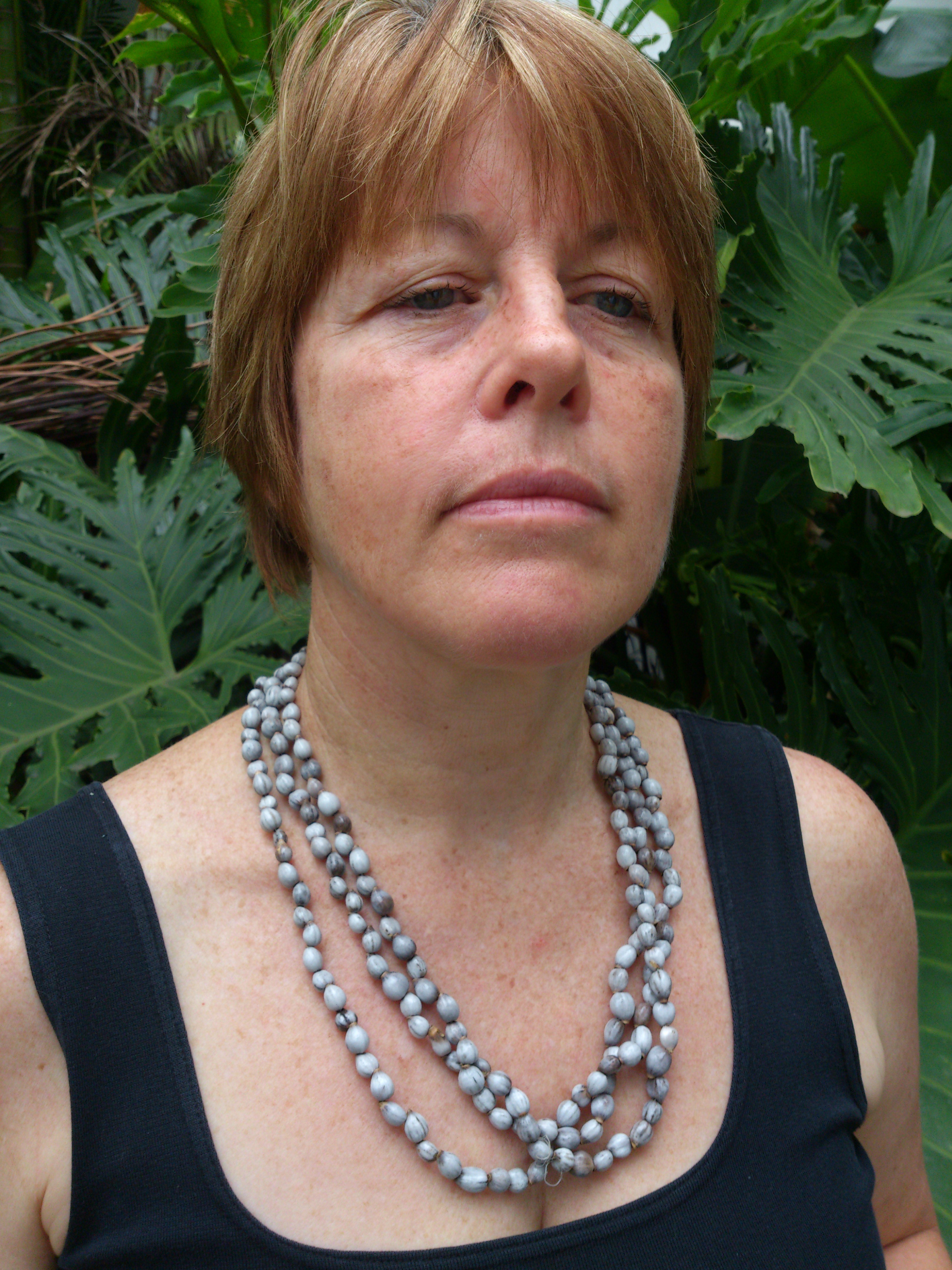
C. lacryma-jobi seeds in a necklace prepared in the Zulu tradition

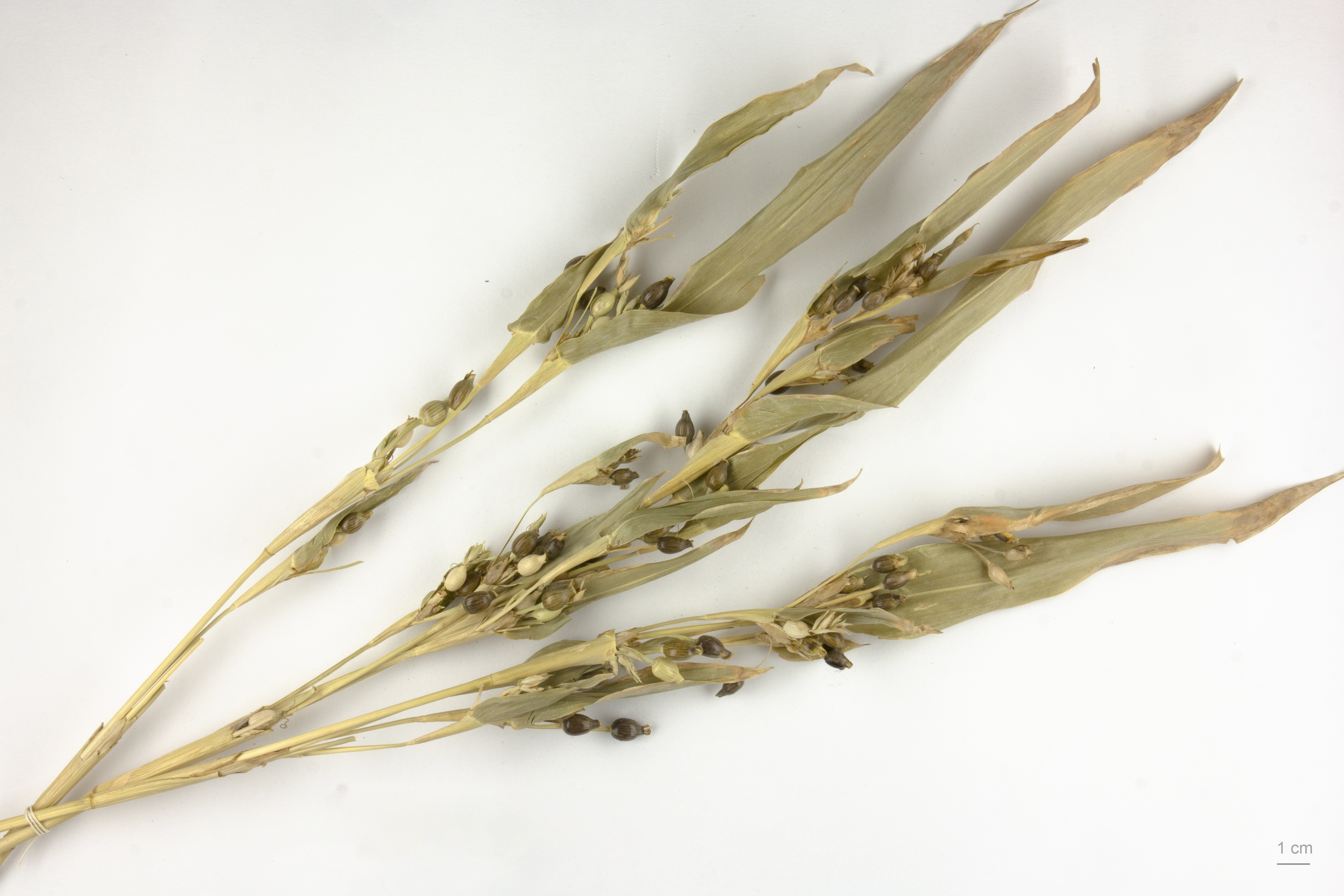
Coix lacryma-jobi - MHNT
