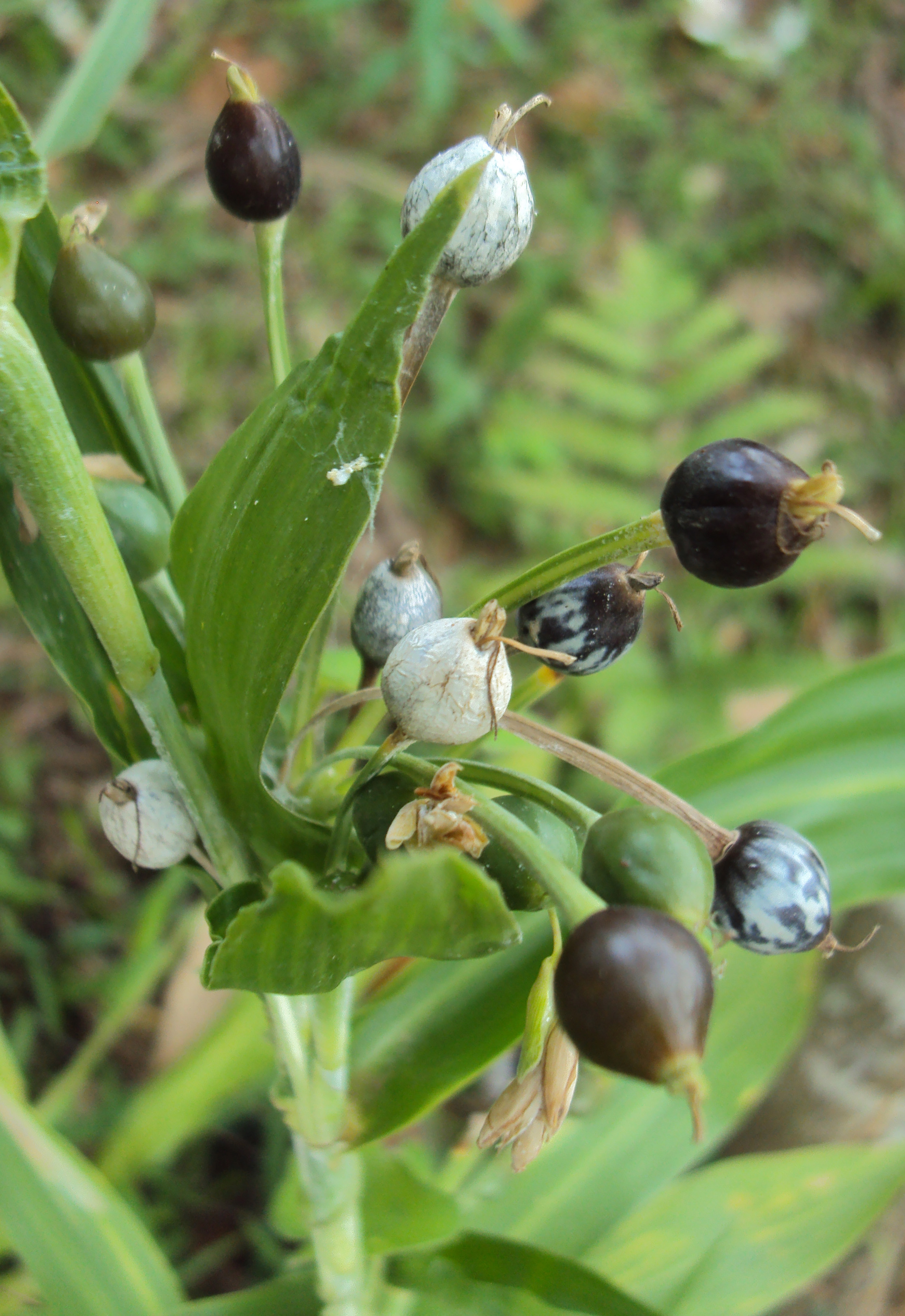
- Coix lacryma-jobi

Scientific classification
- Kingdom: Plantae
- Clade: Tracheophytes
- Clade: Angiosperms
- Clade: Monocots
- Clade: Commelinids
- Order: Poales
- Family: Poaceae
- Subfamily: Panicoideae
- Supertribe: Andropogonodae
- Tribe: Andropogoneae
- Subtribe: Coicinae; Rchb. ex Clayton & Renvoize
- Genus: Coix; L.

Type species
- Coix lacryma-jobi L.

Synonyms
- Lachrymaria Heist. ex Fabr.; Lachryma-jobi Ortega; Lithagrostis Gaertn.; Lacryma Medik.; Sphaerium Kuntze

= Coix =

Genus of grasses

Coix /ˈkoʊɪks/ is a genus of Asian and Australian plants in the grass family.

The best-known species is Coix lacryma-jobi, widely called Job's tears. Its variety Coix lacryma-jobi var. ma-yuen is cultivated in many warm regions as a source of food, medicine, and ornamentation.

The generic name is from Ancient Greek κόϊξ (koix), which originally referred to the doum palm (Hyphaene thebaica); the fruits of the doum palm resemble the diaspores of Coix.

== Species ==
- Coix aquatica Roxb. - China (Yunnan, Guangdong, Guangxi), Indian subcontinent, Indochina, Peninsular Malaysia; naturalized in New Guinea
- Coix gasteenii B.K.Simon - northern Queensland
- Coix lacryma-jobi L. - China, Indian subcontinent, Southeast Asia; naturalized in other parts of Asia as well as in southern Europe, Africa, the Americas, and various oceanic islands

== Formerly Included ==
see Chionachne Polytoca Tripsacum

- Coix angulata - Tripsacum dactyloides
- Coix barbata - Chionachne gigantea
- Coix crypsoides - Chionachne gigantea
- Coix dactyloides - Tripsacum dactyloides
- Coix gigantea J.Koenig 1788 not J.Koenig ex Roxb. 1932 - Chionachne gigantea
- Coix heteroclita - Polytoca digitata
- Coix koenigii - Chionachne gigantea
- Coix sulcata - Chionachne punctata

== Formerly included in ==
This genus was formerly placed in the Maydeae, now known to be polyphyletic. (Note: p. 331, "Maize and Tripsacum were previously grouped with a number of other grasses that have monoecious flowering patterns — the most widely known being Job’s tears (Coix lacryma-jobi) — into the Maydeae (74); however, molecular data revealed that this grouping was polyphyletic (61).")

== Proteins and expression ==
Members of this genus produce their own variety of α-zein prolamins. These prolamins have undergone unusually rapid evolutionary divergence from closely related grasses, by way of copy-number changes. (Note: p. 335, "Clusters of locally duplicated genes can also expand and contract rapidly, as shown by investigation of the 22-kDa α zein gene families in maize, sorghum, and coix, which appear to have experienced independent copy-number amplifications since the divergence of these three species (107).")
