= Lou fo tong =

Cantonese soup

- Traditional Chinese: 老火湯
- Simplified Chinese: 老火汤
Transcriptions
Standard Mandarin
- Hanyu Pinyin: lǎohuǒtāng
- Bopomofo: ㄌㄠˇ ㄏㄨㄛˇ ㄊㄤ
- Wade–Giles: lao^{3}-huo^{3}-t‘ang^{1}
- IPA: [làʊ.xwò.tʰáŋ]
Yue: Cantonese
- Yale Romanization: lóuhfótōng
- Jyutping: lou5 fo2 tong1
- IPA: [lɔw˩˧.fɔ˧˥.tʰɔŋ˥]

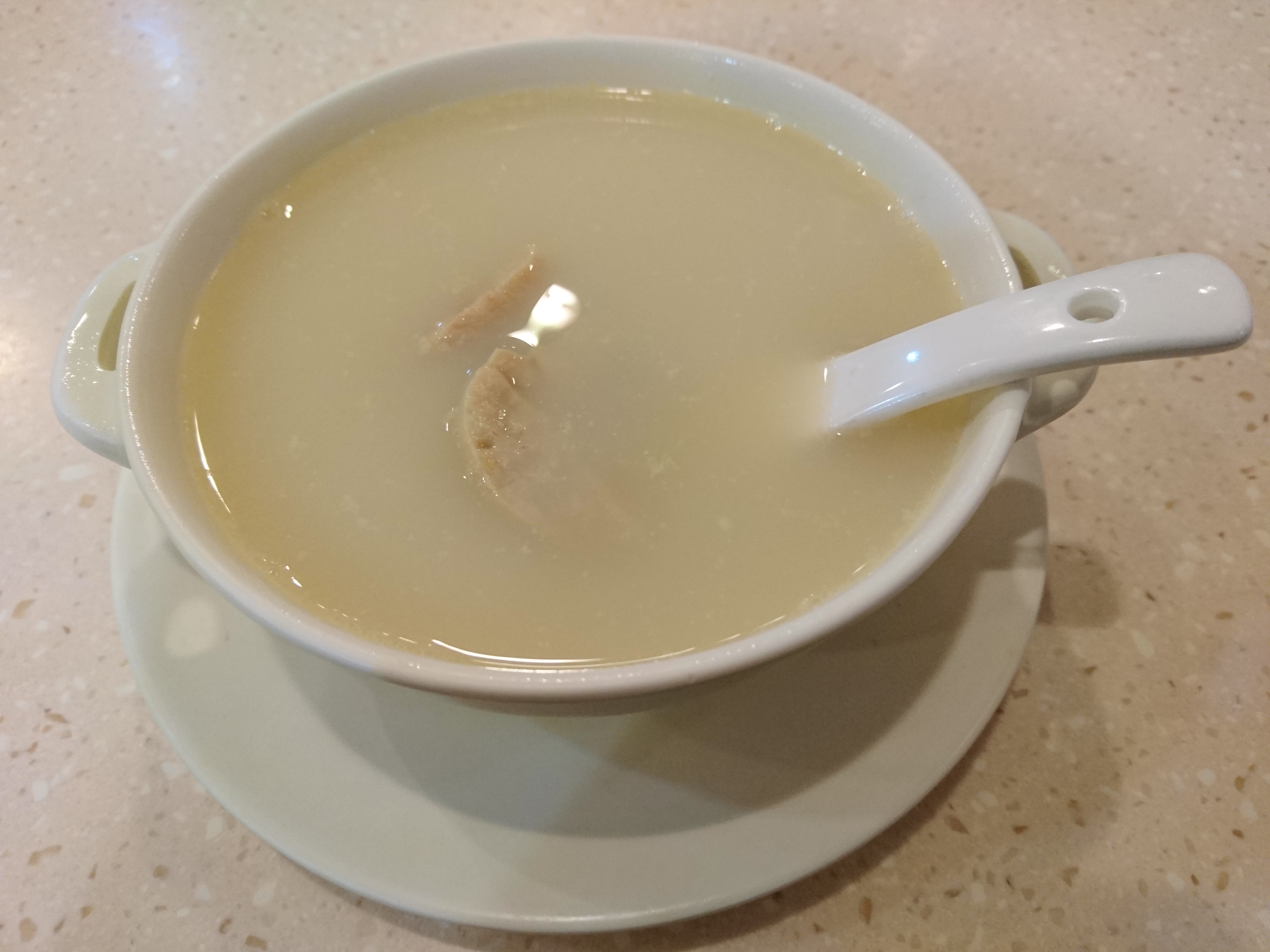
Pork lung soup with apricot juice (杏汁豬肺湯; hanhgjāp jyūfaitōng)

Lou fo tong (Chinese: 老火湯; Cantonese Yale: lóuhfótōng) is a variety of soup in Cantonese cuisine popular among Chinese people in Guangdong, Hong Kong, Macau, and overseas. These soups are usually made by simmering various vegetables, fruits, meat or Chinese herbs in a pressure cooker, vacuum cooker, claypot, wok or clay jar for a few hours, and are believed to have skincare, heart-protective, vision-enhancing, bile-reducing, and bone-strengthening benefits. Owing to the hot and humid climate in the Lingnan region, the locals have developed a penchant for drinking lou fo tong for its nourishing and health-boosting effects.

== Nutrition ==
According to experiments conducted by Jiang Zhuoqin et al., a team from Sun Yat-sen University, the calcium salts in animal bones are barely soluble in water, and bone broth is an ineffective way to obtain calcium. In the first experiment, the average calcium concentration in soup stewed with distilled water was only 1.0–1.2 mg/100 ml. In the second experiment, using a vinegar-soaked method, the calcium concentration reached 178 mg/100 ml. Although the result is higher compared to milk's concentration of at least 100 mg/100 ml, the researchers pointed out that the vinegar required would be more expensive than buying milk itself.

== See also ==
- Ching bo leung
