= Yulmu-cha =

Korean grain and nut tea

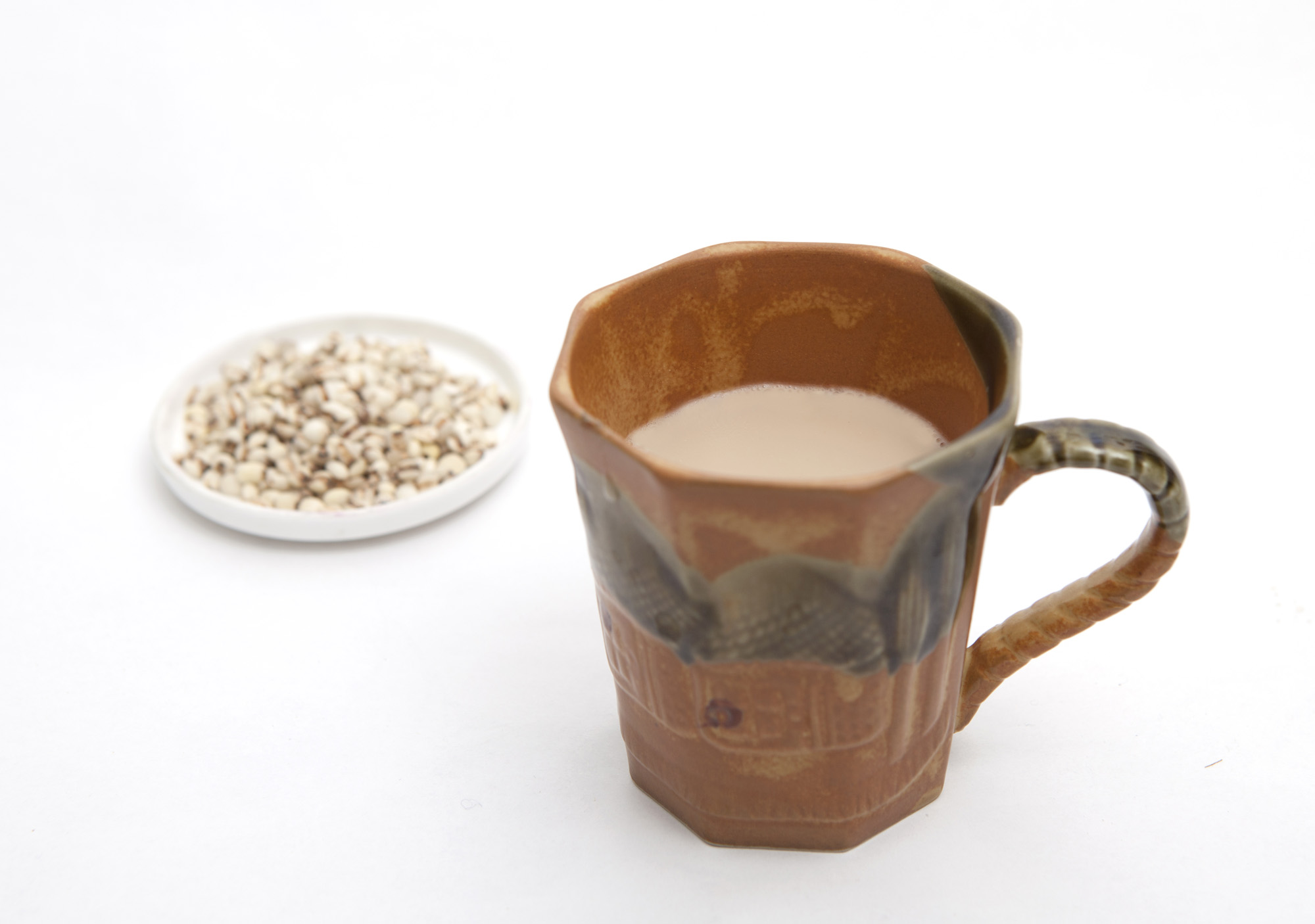
- Type: Tea
- Origin: Korea
- Ingredients: Roasted yulmu powder

Korean name
- Hangul: 율무차
- Hanja: 율무茶
- RR: yulmucha
- MR: yulmuch'a
- IPA: [jul.mu.tɕʰa]

Yulmu-cha (Korean: 율무차) is a tea made of roasted, powdered yulmu (grains of Coix lacryma-jobi var. ma-yuen), sometimes mixed with nuts such as walnut. The tea, usually served hot, is also often sold through vending machines in South Korea.

== See also ==
- Traditional Korean tea
