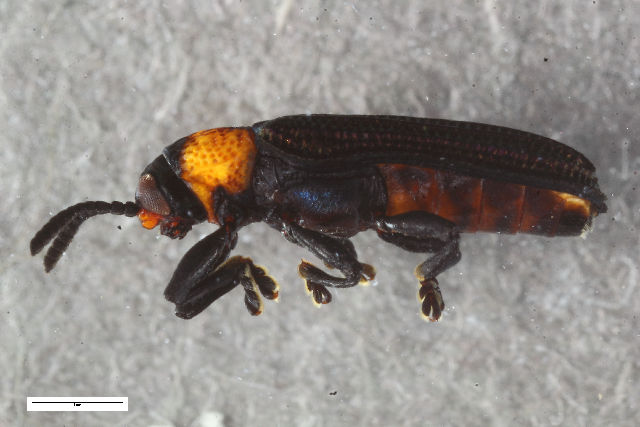

Scientific classification
- Kingdom: Animalia
- Phylum: Arthropoda
- Class: Insecta
- Order: Coleoptera
- Suborder: Polyphaga
- Infraorder: Cucujiformia
- Family: Chrysomelidae
- Genus: Anisostena
- Species: A. lecontii

Binomial name
- Anisostena lecontii (Baly, 1864)

Synonyms
- Charistena lecontii Baly, 1864; Anisostena lecontei; Anisostena leconteii

= Anisostena lecontii =

Species of beetle

Anisostena lecontii is a species of leaf beetle in the family Chrysomelidae. It is found in North America, where it has been recorded from Florida, South Carolina and Virginia.

== Description ==
Adults reach a length of about 4.6-4.8 mm. The head and elytron are black, while the pronotum is red with black basal and apical margins.

== Biology ==
Adults have been collected on Panicum repens, but it is not certain that this is the foodplant.
