= Anisostena arizonica =

Scientific classification
- Kingdom: Animalia
- Phylum: Arthropoda
- Class: Insecta
- Order: Coleoptera
- Suborder: Polyphaga
- Infraorder: Cucujiformia
- Family: Chrysomelidae
- Genus: Anisostena
- Species: A. arizonica

Binomial name
- Anisostena arizonica Schaeffer, 1933

Synonyms
- Anisostena mitchelli White, 1939

Species of beetle

Anisostena arizonica is a species of beetle of the family Chrysomelidae. It is found in Arizona, California, New Mexico, Texas and Mexico.

== Description ==
Adults reach a length of about 3.6 mm. Adults are brown with dark sutural vitta.
