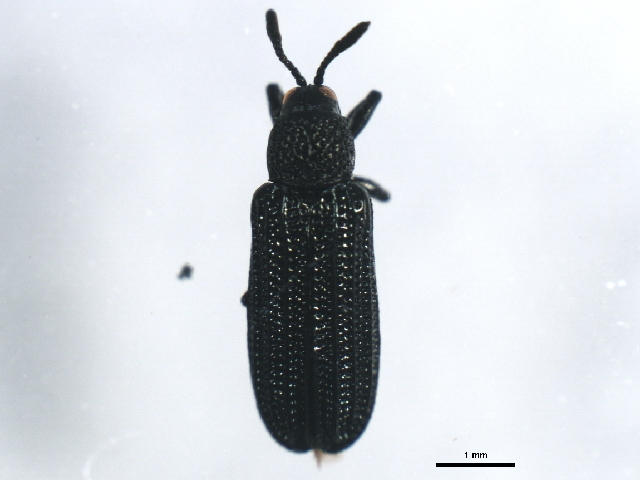

Scientific classification
- Kingdom: Animalia
- Phylum: Arthropoda
- Class: Insecta
- Order: Coleoptera
- Suborder: Polyphaga
- Infraorder: Cucujiformia
- Family: Chrysomelidae
- Genus: Anisostena
- Species: A. nigrita

Binomial name
- Anisostena nigrita (Olivier, 1808)

Synonyms
- Hispa nigrita Olivier, 1808

= Anisostena nigrita =

Species of beetle

Anisostena nigrita, the black tortoise beetle, is a species of leaf beetle in the family Chrysomelidae. It is found in North America, where it has been recorded from Canada (Alberta, British Columbia, Manitoba, New Brunswick, Nova Scotia, Ontario, Quebec) and the United States (Alabama, Arkansas, Colorado, Connecticut, Florida, Georgia, Idaho, Illinois, Indiana, Iowa, Kansas, Kentucky, Louisiana, Maryland, Maine, Michigan, Minnesota, Mississippi, Missouri, Montana, Nebraska, New Jersey, New York, North Carolina, North Dakota, Ohio, Oklahoma, Oregon, South Carolina, Tennessee, Texas, Utah, Virginia, Washington, Wisconsin, Wyoming).

== Biology ==
This species has been found feeding on Andropogon species and Schizachryium scoparium.
