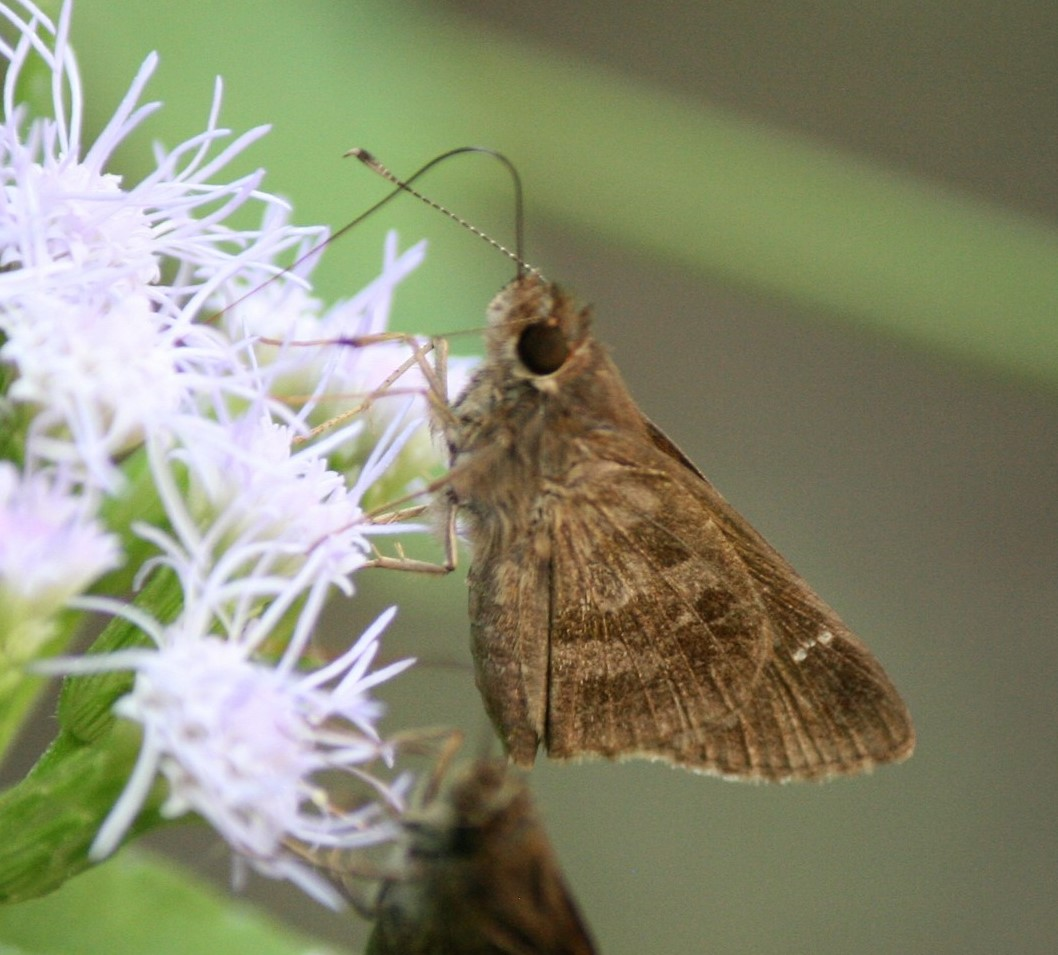

Scientific classification
- Kingdom: Animalia
- Phylum: Arthropoda
- Class: Insecta
- Order: Lepidoptera
- Family: Hesperiidae
- Genus: Cymaenes
- Species: C. lumina

Binomial name
- Cymaenes lumina (Mabille, 1891)

Synonyms
- List: Cobalus lumina Herrich-Schäffer, 1869; Lerema lumina (Herrich-Schäffer, 1869); Pamphila trebius Mabille, 1891; Cymaenes trebius (Mabille, 1891); Carystus odilia Burmeister, 1878; Cymaenes odilia (Burmeister, 1878)

= Cymaenes lumina =

Species of butterfly

Cymaenes lumina, the fawn-spotted skipper, is a species of grass skipper in the butterfly family Hesperiidae. It is found in Central America, North America, and South America.
