= Anisostena breveapicalis =

Scientific classification
- Kingdom: Animalia
- Phylum: Arthropoda
- Class: Insecta
- Order: Coleoptera
- Suborder: Polyphaga
- Infraorder: Cucujiformia
- Family: Chrysomelidae
- Genus: Anisostena
- Species: A. breveapicalis

Binomial name
- Anisostena breveapicalis Pic, 1934

Species of beetle

Anisostena breveapicalis is a species of beetle of the family Chrysomelidae. It is found in Brazil.
