= Anisostena texana =

Scientific classification
- Kingdom: Animalia
- Phylum: Arthropoda
- Class: Insecta
- Order: Coleoptera
- Suborder: Polyphaga
- Infraorder: Cucujiformia
- Family: Chrysomelidae
- Genus: Anisostena
- Species: A. texana

Binomial name
- Anisostena texana Schaeffer, 1933

Species of beetle

Anisostena texana is a species of leaf beetle in the family Chrysomelidae. It is found in Central America and North America, where it has been recorded from Arizona, New Mexico, Oklahoma, Texas and Mexico (Chiapas, Oaxaca).

== Description ==
Adults reach a length of about 4.1-4.6 mm. The head and elytron are metallic blue, while the pronotum is reddish-orange.

== Biology ==
Adults have been recorded on Schizachyrium scoparium, but it is not certain if this is the foodplant.
