= Anisostena cyanoptera =

Scientific classification
- Kingdom: Animalia
- Phylum: Arthropoda
- Class: Insecta
- Order: Coleoptera
- Suborder: Polyphaga
- Infraorder: Cucujiformia
- Family: Chrysomelidae
- Genus: Anisostena
- Species: A. cyanoptera

Binomial name
- Anisostena cyanoptera (Suffrian, 1868)

Synonyms
- Odontota cyanoptera Suffrian, 1868

Species of beetle

Anisostena cyanoptera is a species of beetle of the family Chrysomelidae. It is found in Cuba, Jamaica and Hispaniola.

== Description ==
Adults reach a length of about 3.3–3.8 mm. The head and elytron are blue, while the pronotum is red.
