= Anisostena vittata =

Scientific classification
- Kingdom: Animalia
- Phylum: Arthropoda
- Class: Insecta
- Order: Coleoptera
- Suborder: Polyphaga
- Infraorder: Cucujiformia
- Family: Chrysomelidae
- Genus: Anisostena
- Species: A. vittata

Binomial name
- Anisostena vittata Staines, 1994

Species of beetle

Anisostena vittata is a species of beetle of the family Chrysomelidae. It is found in Ecuador.

== Description ==
Adults reach a length of about 3.1–3.4 mm. They have a black head, while the pronotum is orange. The elytron is black with a yellow vitta.
