= Anisostena funesta =

Scientific classification
- Kingdom: Animalia
- Phylum: Arthropoda
- Class: Insecta
- Order: Coleoptera
- Suborder: Polyphaga
- Infraorder: Cucujiformia
- Family: Chrysomelidae
- Genus: Anisostena
- Species: A. funesta

Binomial name
- Anisostena funesta (Baly, 1885)

Synonyms
- Charistena funesta Baly, 1885

Species of beetle

Anisostena funesta is a species of leaf beetle in the family Chrysomelidae. It is found in Central America and North America, where it has been recorded from the United States (Arizona, Louisiana, Missouri, Oklahoma, Texas), El Salvador, Guatemala, Honduras, Mexico and Nicaragua.

== Biology ==
Adults have been recorded on Paspalum pubiflorum and Paspalum setaceum, but the foodplant is uncertain.
