= Anisostena gracilis =

Scientific classification
- Kingdom: Animalia
- Phylum: Arthropoda
- Class: Insecta
- Order: Coleoptera
- Suborder: Polyphaga
- Infraorder: Cucujiformia
- Family: Chrysomelidae
- Genus: Anisostena
- Species: A. gracilis

Binomial name
- Anisostena gracilis (Horn, 1883)

Synonyms
- Charistena gracilis Horn, 1883

Species of beetle

Anisostena gracilis is a species of leaf beetle in the family Chrysomelidae. It is found in Central America and North America, where it has been recorded from Arizona, Texas and Mexico (Hidalgo, Jalisco, Michoacan, Nayarit, Nuevo Leon, Tamaulipas, Vera Cruz).

== Description ==
Adults reach a length of about 3-3.7 mm. They are orange-red or yellowish with a black sutural vitta.

== Biology ==
This species has been found feeding on Panicum maximum.
