= Anisostena daguerrei =

Scientific classification
- Kingdom: Animalia
- Phylum: Arthropoda
- Class: Insecta
- Order: Coleoptera
- Suborder: Polyphaga
- Infraorder: Cucujiformia
- Family: Chrysomelidae
- Genus: Anisostena
- Species: A. daguerrei

Binomial name
- Anisostena daguerrei Uhmann, 1938

Species of beetle

Anisostena daguerrei is a species of beetle of the family Chrysomelidae. It is found in Argentina and Paraguay.
