= Anisostena bellula =

Scientific classification
- Kingdom: Animalia
- Phylum: Arthropoda
- Class: Insecta
- Order: Coleoptera
- Suborder: Polyphaga
- Infraorder: Cucujiformia
- Family: Chrysomelidae
- Genus: Anisostena
- Species: A. bellula

Binomial name
- Anisostena bellula (Baly, 1864)

Synonyms
- Charistena bellula Baly, 1864

Species of beetle

Anisostena bellula is a species of beetle of the family Chrysomelidae. It is found in Colombia, Costa Rica and Mexico.

== Description ==
Adults reach a length of about 3.25–3.4 mm. They have a metallic blue head and elytron, while the pronotum is red.
