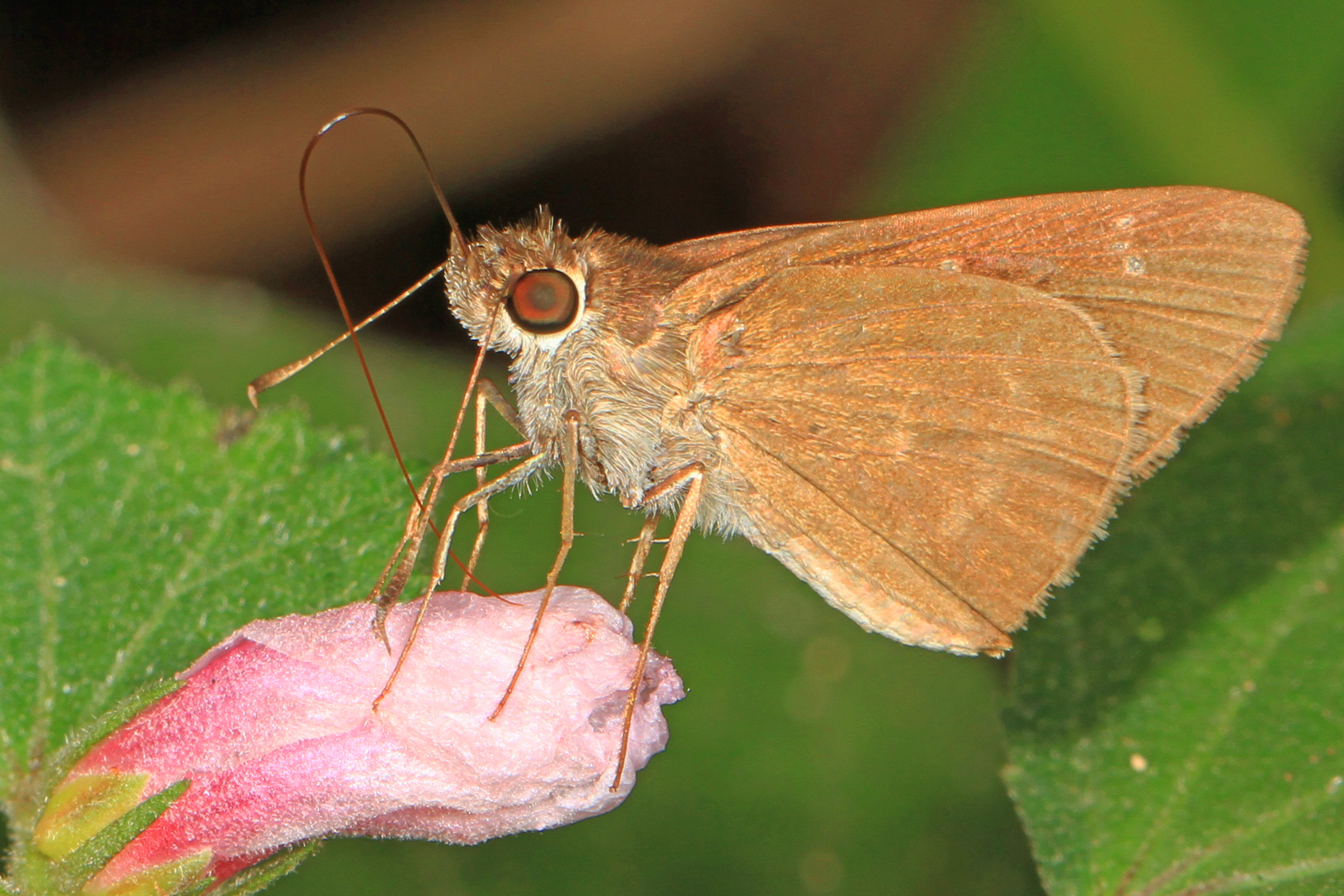
- Cymaenes tripunctus

Scientific classification
- Kingdom: Animalia
- Phylum: Arthropoda
- Class: Insecta
- Order: Lepidoptera
- Family: Hesperiidae
- Subtribe: Moncina
- Genus: Cymaenes; Scudder, 1872

= Cymaenes =

Genus of butterflies

Cymaenes is a genus of skippers in the family Hesperiidae.

== Species ==
Recognised species include:

- Cymaenes aequatoria (Hayward, 1940)
- Cymaenes edata (Plötz, 1882)
- Cymaenes idria Evans, 1955
- Cymaenes isus (Godman, 1900)
- Cymaenes laureolus (Schaus, 1913)
- Cymaenes lochius Plötz, 1882
- Cymaenes loxa Evans, 1955
- Cymaenes lumina (Herrich-Schäffer, 1869)
- Cymaenes miqua (Dyar, 1913)
- Cymaenes psyllus (Mabille, 1898)
- Cymaenes sipariana Kaye, 1925
- Cymaenes tripunctus (Herrich-Schäffer, 1865)

=== Former species ===
- Cymaenes corescene (Stoll, 1782) - synonymized to Cymaenes lumina (Herrich-Schäffer, 1869)
- Cymaenes fraus Godman, 1900 - transferred to Vidius fraus (Godman, 1900)
- Cymaenes odilia (Burmeister, 1878) - synonymized to Cymaenes lumina (Herrich-Schäffer, 1869)
- Cymaenes trebius (Mabille, 1891) - synonymized to Cymaenes lumina (Herrich-Schäffer, 1869)
