= Anisostena perspicua =

Scientific classification
- Kingdom: Animalia
- Phylum: Arthropoda
- Class: Insecta
- Order: Coleoptera
- Suborder: Polyphaga
- Infraorder: Cucujiformia
- Family: Chrysomelidae
- Genus: Anisostena
- Species: A. perspicua

Binomial name
- Anisostena perspicua (Horn, 1883)

Synonyms
- Charistena perspicua Horn, 1883

Species of beetle

Anisostena perspicua is a species of leaf beetle in the family Chrysomelidae. It is found in Central America and North America, where it has been recorded from the United States (Arizona, California, Nevada, New Mexico, Oklahoma, Texas, Utah), Mexico (Baja California) and El Salvador.

== Biology ==
It has been recorded from Acacia constricta, Bothriochloa, Sporobolus and Tridens, but the foodplant is uncertain.
