= Anisostena confusa =

Scientific classification
- Kingdom: Animalia
- Phylum: Arthropoda
- Clade: Pancrustacea
- Class: Insecta
- Order: Coleoptera
- Suborder: Polyphaga
- Infraorder: Cucujiformia
- Family: Chrysomelidae
- Genus: Anisostena
- Species: A. confusa

Binomial name
- Anisostena confusa Staines, 1994

Species of beetle

Anisostena confusa is a species of beetle of the family Chrysomelidae. It is found in Ecuador, French Guiana, Mexico and Venezuela.

== Description ==
Adults reach a length of about 3.6 mm. They have a black head and a yellow pronotum. The elytron is yellow with black sutural and lateral vittae.
