= Anisostena bicolor =

Scientific classification
- Kingdom: Animalia
- Phylum: Arthropoda
- Class: Insecta
- Order: Coleoptera
- Suborder: Polyphaga
- Infraorder: Cucujiformia
- Family: Chrysomelidae
- Genus: Anisostena
- Species: A. bicolor

Binomial name
- Anisostena bicolor (J.Smith, 1885)

Synonyms
- Charistena bicolor J.Smith, 1885

Species of beetle

Anisostena bicolor is a species of beetle of the family Chrysomelidae. It is found in the United States (Arizona, California, Idaho, Kansas, New Mexico, Oklahoma) and Mexico (Baja California).

== Description ==
Adults reach a length of about 3.8–4.6 mm. Their head has a metallic green sheen and the elytron is dark metallic blue, while the pronotum is red.

== Biology ==
This species has been found feeding on Tripsacum dactyloides.
