= Anisostena kansana =

Scientific classification
- Kingdom: Animalia
- Phylum: Arthropoda
- Class: Insecta
- Order: Coleoptera
- Suborder: Polyphaga
- Infraorder: Cucujiformia
- Family: Chrysomelidae
- Genus: Anisostena
- Species: A. kansana

Binomial name
- Anisostena kansana Schaeffer, 1933

Species of beetle

Anisostena kansana is a species of leaf beetle in the family Chrysomelidae. It is found in North America, where it has been recorded from Kansas, Mississippi, Missouri and Oklahoma.

== Description ==
Adults reach a length of about 4.1-5.3 mm. The head and elytron are metallic greenish-blue, while the pronotum is reddish-orange with the anterior area greenish-blue.

== Biology ==
This species has been found feeding on Tripsacum dactyloides.
