= Anisostena scapularis =

Scientific classification
- Kingdom: Animalia
- Phylum: Arthropoda
- Class: Insecta
- Order: Coleoptera
- Suborder: Polyphaga
- Infraorder: Cucujiformia
- Family: Chrysomelidae
- Genus: Anisostena
- Species: A. scapularis

Binomial name
- Anisostena scapularis Uhmann, 1964

Species of beetle

Anisostena scapularis is a species of beetle of the family Chrysomelidae. It is found in Peru.

== Description ==
Adults reach a length of about 4.7-4.85 mm. They have a black body, with two yellow spots on the pronotum and yellow markings on the elytron.
