= Anisostena prompta =

Scientific classification
- Kingdom: Animalia
- Phylum: Arthropoda
- Class: Insecta
- Order: Coleoptera
- Suborder: Polyphaga
- Infraorder: Cucujiformia
- Family: Chrysomelidae
- Genus: Anisostena
- Species: A. prompta

Binomial name
- Anisostena prompta Weise, 1910

Synonyms
- Anisostena fasciata Maulik, 1929

Species of beetle

Anisostena prompta is a species of beetle of the family Chrysomelidae. It is found in Argentina, Brazil (Bahia, Minas Gerais, Matto Grosso, São Paulo), Colombia and Paraguay.

== Description ==
Adults reach a length of about 4.1-4.7 mm. Subspecies prompta has a black head and an orange-red pronotum with black markings. The elytron is also orange-red with black vittae. Subspecies fasciata also has a black head, but the pronotum is yellow with black markings and the elytron is black with yellow vittae.

== Biology ==
This species has been found feeding on Panicum leucophaeum.

== Subspecies ==
- Anisostena prompta prompta (Argentina, Paraguay, and Brazil)
- Anisostena prompta fasciata Maulik, 1929 ( Brazil to Colombia)
