= Anisostena pilatei =

Scientific classification
- Kingdom: Animalia
- Phylum: Arthropoda
- Class: Insecta
- Order: Coleoptera
- Suborder: Polyphaga
- Infraorder: Cucujiformia
- Family: Chrysomelidae
- Genus: Anisostena
- Species: A. pilatei

Binomial name
- Anisostena pilatei (Baly, 1864)

Synonyms
- Charistena pilatei Baly, 1864; Anisostena diversecostata Pic, 1932

Species of beetle

Anisostena pilatei is a species of beetle of the family Chrysomelidae. It is found in Belize, Costa Rica, El Salvador, Guatemala, Honduras, Mexico, Nicaragua and Panama.

== Description ==
Adults reach a length of about 2.7–4 mm. They are orangish-red, with shining aeneus green markings on the elytron.
