= Anisostena warchalowskii =

Scientific classification
- Kingdom: Animalia
- Phylum: Arthropoda
- Class: Insecta
- Order: Coleoptera
- Suborder: Polyphaga
- Infraorder: Cucujiformia
- Family: Chrysomelidae
- Genus: Anisostena
- Species: A. warchalowskii

Binomial name
- Anisostena warchalowskii Staines, 2007

Species of beetle

Anisostena warchalowskii is a species of beetle of the family Chrysomelidae. It is found in Colombia.
