= Anisostena trilineata =

Scientific classification
- Kingdom: Animalia
- Phylum: Arthropoda
- Class: Insecta
- Order: Coleoptera
- Suborder: Polyphaga
- Infraorder: Cucujiformia
- Family: Chrysomelidae
- Genus: Anisostena
- Species: A. trilineata

Binomial name
- Anisostena trilineata (Baly, 1864)

Synonyms
- Charistena trilineata Baly, 1864

Species of beetle

Anisostena trilineata is a species of beetle of the family Chrysomelidae. It is found in Belize, Costa Rica, El Salvador, Guatemala, Honduras, Mexico and Nicaragua.

== Description ==
Adults reach a length of about 2.8–3.8 mm. They are orange. The pronotum sometimes has black markings, while the elytron has black sutural and lateral vittae.
