= Anisostena angustata =

Scientific classification
- Kingdom: Animalia
- Phylum: Arthropoda
- Class: Insecta
- Order: Coleoptera
- Suborder: Polyphaga
- Infraorder: Cucujiformia
- Family: Chrysomelidae
- Genus: Anisostena
- Species: A. angustata

Binomial name
- Anisostena angustata Pic, 1934

Species of beetle

Anisostena angustata is a species of beetle from the family Chrysomelidae. It was first described in 1934 by Maurice Pic. It is found in Argentina and Brazil (São Paulo).

It typically has a parallel slender body and curved mesotibia.
