= Anisostena nunenmacheri =

Scientific classification
- Kingdom: Animalia
- Phylum: Arthropoda
- Class: Insecta
- Order: Coleoptera
- Suborder: Polyphaga
- Infraorder: Cucujiformia
- Family: Chrysomelidae
- Genus: Anisostena
- Species: A. nunenmacheri

Binomial name
- Anisostena nunenmacheri (Weise, 1907)

Synonyms
- Charistena nunenmacheri Weise, 1907

Species of beetle

Anisostena nunenmacheri is a species of beetle of the family Chrysomelidae. It is found in Arizona and Mexico (Sonora).

== Description ==
Adults reach a length of about 2.8–3.4 mm. They are reddish-brown. The elytron usually has a black sutural vitta.
