= Anisostena missionensis =

Scientific classification
- Kingdom: Animalia
- Phylum: Arthropoda
- Class: Insecta
- Order: Coleoptera
- Suborder: Polyphaga
- Infraorder: Cucujiformia
- Family: Chrysomelidae
- Genus: Anisostena
- Species: A. missionensis

Binomial name
- Anisostena missionensis Monrós & Viana, 1947

Species of beetle

Anisostena missionensis is a species of beetle of the family Chrysomelidae. It is found in Argentina (Misiones).

== Biology ==
This species has been found feeding on grass species.
