= Anisostena suturalis =

Scientific classification
- Kingdom: Animalia
- Phylum: Arthropoda
- Class: Insecta
- Order: Coleoptera
- Suborder: Polyphaga
- Infraorder: Cucujiformia
- Family: Chrysomelidae
- Genus: Anisostena
- Species: A. suturalis

Binomial name
- Anisostena suturalis (Weise, 1907)

Synonyms
- Charistena suturalis Weise, 1907

Species of beetle

Anisostena suturalis is a species of leaf beetle in the family Chrysomelidae. It is found in North America, where it has been recorded from Arizona and Texas.

== Description ==
Adults reach a length of about 3.4–4 mm. They are orangish-yellow with a dark sutural vitta on the elytron.
