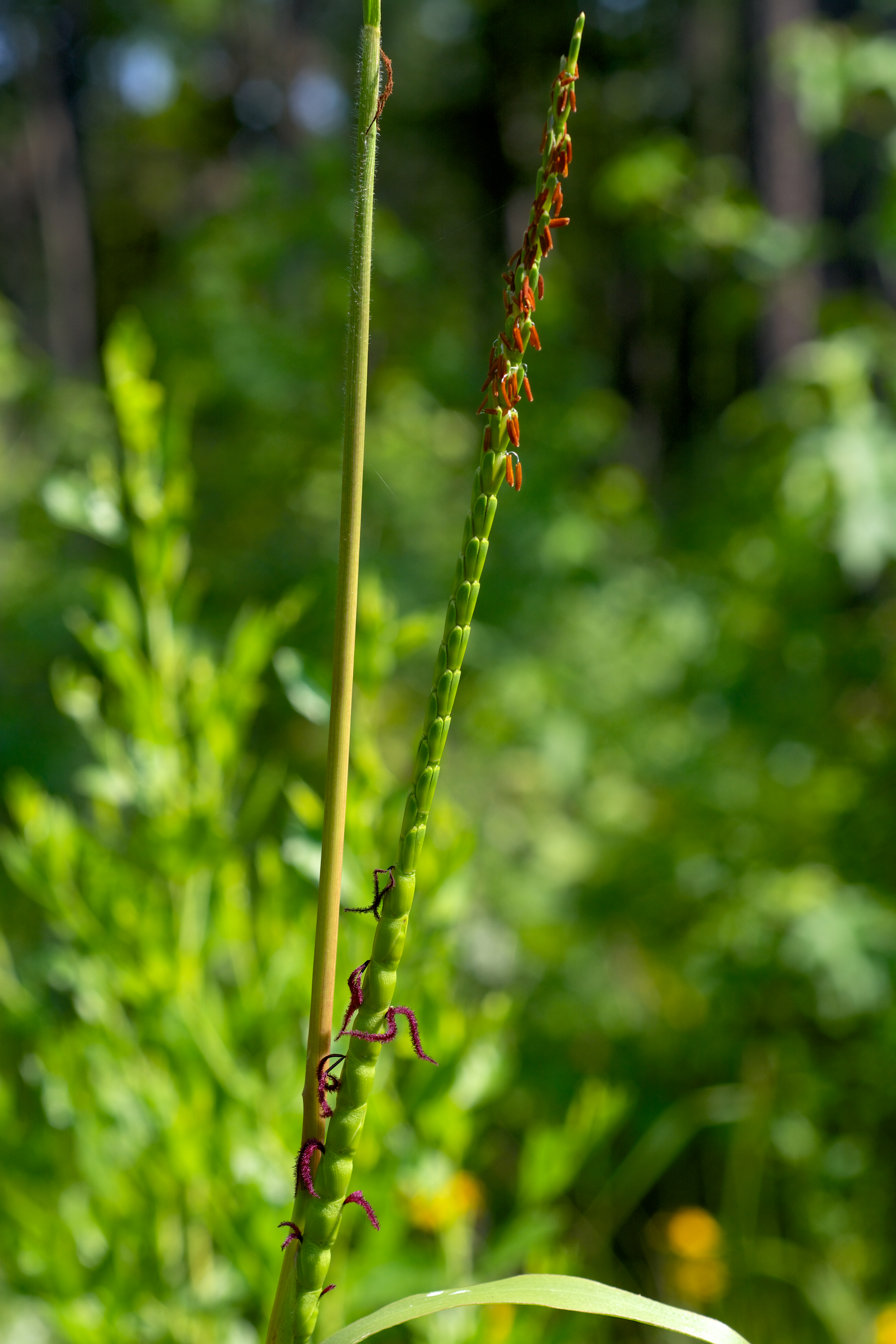
- Detail of staminate and pistillate flowers
- Secure (NatureServe)

Scientific classification
- Kingdom: Plantae
- Clade: Tracheophytes
- Clade: Angiosperms
- Clade: Monocots
- Clade: Commelinids
- Order: Poales
- Family: Poaceae
- Subfamily: Panicoideae
- Genus: Tripsacum
- Species: T. dactyloides

Binomial name
- Tripsacum dactyloides (L.) L. 1759

Synonyms
- Coix angulatus Miller; Coix dactyloides L. 1753; Dactylodes angulatum Kuntze; Dactylodes dactyloides (L.) Kuntze; Ischaemum glabrum Walter; Tripsacum bravum J.R.Gray; Tripsacum compressum E.Fourn.; Tripsacum floridanum Porter ex Vasey; Tripsacum monostachyon Willd.

= Tripsacum dactyloides =

Species of flowering plant

Tripsacum dactyloides, commonly called eastern gamagrass, or Fakahatchee grass, is a warm-season, sod-forming bunch grass. It is widespread in the Western Hemisphere, native from the eastern United States to northern South America. Its natural habitat is in sunny moist areas, such as along watercourses and in wet prairies. In some areas, it has adapted well to disturbed conditions.

Eastern gamagrass is a widely cultivated for its use as forage.

== Description ==
Usually, gamagrass grows to a height of 2–3 feet (0.61–0.91 m), but it can be as high as 8–10 ft (2.4–3.0 m). It is one of the species in the family Poaceae, tribe Andropogoneae, and subtribe Tripsacinae, the same subtribe of the Zea mays corn species.

Roots: Eastern gamagrass has several short, fibrous, thick rhizomes. Eastern gamagrass can survive droughts and floods for a long time because of its rigid and thick rhizomatous roots which firmly holding the plant upright. The deep and hollow roots of the plant branch out from lower nodes.

Leaves: Since the grass has short internodes, all the leaves grow out from the plant's base. Each clump's diameter can increase up to 4 ft (1.2 m). The stems and leaves have a purplish color and are glabrous. The glabrous leaf-blade is around 1.5 m (4 ft 11 in) long, 9–35 millimetres (0.35–1.38 in) wide and has hairs at the base. The distinct midrib leaves of gamagrass can grow up to a height of 12–24 inches (300–610 mm) and a width of 0.375–0.75 in (9.5–19.1 mm).

Flowers: The flowers of eastern gamagrass, which blooms from late March to early October, consist of spikes made up of female and male spikelets. It has separate female and male flowers on the same individual making it a monoecious plant. The inflorescence of the terminal axillary bud is 10–30 centimetres (3.9–11.8 in) long. The type of inflorescence is usually a single raceme or a panicle with a combination of two to three unisexual single racemes.

Fruits: The seed-producing season of the grass is from June to September. The seeds mature disproportionally and production is commonly slow. The joints of the seedhead break into two as the fruit matures and each seed-bearing part contains one seed. The size of the seedhead can range from 6 to 10 inches. Usually, spikelets of grass assist reproduction by holding the grain and fruit. When the mature female spikelets are destroyed they separate like pop-beads.

== Distribution ==
Tripsacum dactyloides is widely spread throughout the United States, from Connecticut to Nebraska and south to Florida and Texas. It is also found as far south as South America, in Paraguay and Brazil. The plant has been cultivated outside of its native range in the southwestern United States and elsewhere.

== Ecology ==
Tripsacum dactyloides is a larval host for Cymaenes tripunctus, and Lerema accius. Its foliage also provides food for the larvae of Anisostena bicolor, Anisostena kansana, Sphenophorus maidis and Chilophaga tripsaci. Bison, elk, and other large herbivores grazed on the foliage. Small mammals, birds and lizards use Tripsacum dactyloides as cover. The fruit is eaten by deer.

== Cultivation ==
The best growing conditions for eastern gamagrass are provided by wet land, such as floodplains along riverbanks. Moreover, moist, nonalkaline lowland areas will maintain the growth of gamagrass because the land can endure a longer time under flood conditions. The soil that is most suitable for eastern gamagrass is moist, little drained fertile soil that has an annual precipitation of 900–1,500 mm (35–59 in) and a pH of 5.5 to 7.5.

Tripsacum dactyloides can tolerate a maximum of three weeks of flooding without dying. The deep roots, which extend to around 4.5 m (15 ft) underground, are the key structure that allows gamagrass to tolerate drought.

== Uses ==
Eastern gamagrass was widely considered a high class feedcrop among the early settlers of the United States. However, it started to disappear because of grain crops and cattle grazing. Around the late 1980s and early 1990s, people started to pay attention again to eastern gamagrass as a forage in summer, since it is productive, palatable and easily digestible by almost all cattle. For these reasons, gamagrass is ideally suitable for feed crops, including hay and pasture forage for which rotation of grazing seasons is controlled. It is used as forage because the growing season of the grass is earlier compared to other warm-season grasses and later compared to cool-season grass and legumes. Eastern gamagrass requires a moderate amount of carbohydrates stored in the leaf bases for regrowth. If the plant is grazed before carbohydrate accumulates in the leaf bases, the plant will die from overgrazing.

Gamagrass is also suitable as a wildlife habitat. Hollow space in the middle of dispersed bundles and the tented canopy created by the leaves growing from the rhizomes and dropping into the middle make the plant an attractive habitat for wildlife. For example, the empty space in the middle of bundles is large enough for wild animals like quails and prairie chickens to build nests. Moreover, the grass provides good cover during the winter for grassland sparrows.

Gamagrass grows from mid-April to mid-September. This is a little earlier in the year compared to other native warm-season grasses like big bluestem (Andropogon gerardi) and switch grass (Panicum virgatum). The high relative yield of gamagrass in summer is the major reason why this grass is a good feedcrop when cool-season grasses ("tall fescue") are undeveloped.

== Genetics ==
Hybrids have been created by crossing Zea mays and the tetraploid (2n = 72) form of T. dactyloides. Genetic analysis in 2016 showed that at least three subspecies are distinct in speciation two diploid forms (2n = 36) var. meridionale (referred to as MR), and another subspecies mentioned only as DD, this alongside the tetraploid form referred to as DL. Tripsacum dactyloides var. meridionale is mentioned to be a subspecies most common in South America, having a morphological difference with its North American counterpart in that it has 'subdigitate recemes usually appressed with the apical male sections typically curved'. More genetics work is needed to better differentiate subspecies.
