= Anisostena bicoloriceps =

Scientific classification
- Kingdom: Animalia
- Phylum: Arthropoda
- Class: Insecta
- Order: Coleoptera
- Suborder: Polyphaga
- Infraorder: Cucujiformia
- Family: Chrysomelidae
- Genus: Anisostena
- Species: A. bicoloriceps

Binomial name
- Anisostena bicoloriceps Pic, 1928

Synonyms
- Charistena elongaticeps Pic, 1928

Species of beetle

Anisostena bicoloriceps is a species of beetle of the family Chrysomelidae. It is found in Argentina (Corrientes), Brazil and Paraguay.

== Biology ==
This species has been found feeding on Panicum species and Valota insularis.
