= Anisostena cyanea =

Scientific classification
- Kingdom: Animalia
- Phylum: Arthropoda
- Class: Insecta
- Order: Coleoptera
- Suborder: Polyphaga
- Infraorder: Cucujiformia
- Family: Chrysomelidae
- Genus: Anisostena
- Species: A. cyanea

Binomial name
- Anisostena cyanea Staines, 1994

Species of beetle

Anisostena cyanea is a species of leaf beetle in the family Chrysomelidae. It is found in Central America and North America, where it has been recorded from Arizona, Texas and Mexico.

== Biology ==
Adults have been collected on Bothriochloa saccharides, Bothriochloa barbinoidis and Bothriochloa laguroides torreyana, but the foodplant is uncertain.
