= Anisostena bondari =

Scientific classification
- Kingdom: Animalia
- Phylum: Arthropoda
- Class: Insecta
- Order: Coleoptera
- Suborder: Polyphaga
- Infraorder: Cucujiformia
- Family: Chrysomelidae
- Genus: Anisostena
- Species: A. bondari

Binomial name
- Anisostena bondari (Maulik, 1929)

Synonyms
- Chalepus bondari Maulik, 1929

Species of beetle

Anisostena bondari is a species of beetle of the family Chrysomelidae. It is found in Brazil (Bahia).

== Biology ==
This species has been found feeding on Paspalum species and Panicum latifolium.
