= Anisostena elegantula =

Scientific classification
- Kingdom: Animalia
- Phylum: Arthropoda
- Class: Insecta
- Order: Coleoptera
- Suborder: Polyphaga
- Infraorder: Cucujiformia
- Family: Chrysomelidae
- Genus: Anisostena
- Species: A. elegantula

Binomial name
- Anisostena elegantula (Baly, 1864)

Synonyms
- Charistena elegantula Suffrian, 1868

Species of beetle

Anisostena elegantula is a species of beetle of the family Chrysomelidae. It is found in Colombia and Mexico (Chiapas, Oaxaca, Tabasco, Veracruz).

== Description ==
Adults reach a length of about 3.5 mm. The head and pronotum are orange, while the elytron is metallic blue.
