= Anisostena =

Scientific classification
- Kingdom: Animalia
- Phylum: Arthropoda
- Clade: Pancrustacea
- Class: Insecta
- Order: Coleoptera
- Suborder: Polyphaga
- Infraorder: Cucujiformia
- Family: Chrysomelidae
- Subfamily: Cassidinae
- Tribe: Chalepini
- Genus: Anisostena; Weise, 1910

Genus of beetles

Anisostena is a genus of tortoise beetles and hispines in the family Chrysomelidae. There are at least 30 described species in Anisostena.

== Species ==
These 30 species belong to the genus Anisostena:

- Subgenus Anisostena
  - Anisostena ariadne (Newman, 1841)
  - Anisostena arizonica Schaeffer, 1933
  - Anisostena bellula (Baly, 1864)
  - Anisostena bicolor (J.Smith, 1885)
  - Anisostena californica Van Dyke, 1925
  - Anisostena confusa Staines, 1994
  - Anisostena cyanea Staines, 1994
  - Anisostena cyanoptera (Suffrian, 1868)
  - Anisostena daguerrei Uhmann, 1938
  - Anisostena elegantula (Baly, 1864)
  - Anisostena funesta (Baly, 1885)
  - Anisostena gracilis (Horn, 1883)
  - Anisostena kansana Schaeffer, 1933
  - Anisostena lecontii (Baly, 1864)
  - Anisostena nigrita (Olivier, 1808)
  - Anisostena nunenmacheri (Weise, 1907)
  - Anisostena perspicua (Horn, 1883)
  - Anisostena pilatei (Baly, 1864)
  - Anisostena prompta Weise, 1910
  - Anisostena scapularis Uhmann, 1964
  - Anisostena suturalis (Weise, 1907)
  - Anisostena texana Schaeffer, 1933
  - Anisostena trilineata (Baly, 1864)
  - Anisostena vittata Staines, 1994
  - Anisostena warchalowskii Staines, 2007
- Subgenus Apostena Staines 1993
  - Anisostena angustata Pic, 1934
  - Anisostena missionensis Monrós & Viana, 1947
- Subgenus Neostena Monrós & Viana, 1947
  - Anisostena bicoloriceps Pic, 1928
  - Anisostena bondari (Maulik, 1929)
  - Anisostena breveapicalis Pic, 1934
