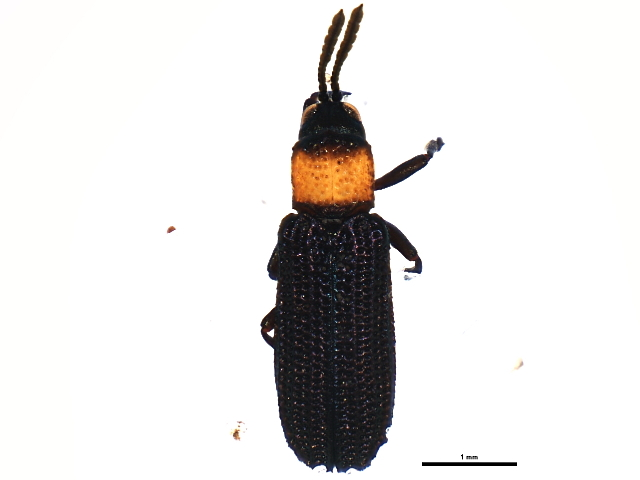

Scientific classification
- Kingdom: Animalia
- Phylum: Arthropoda
- Class: Insecta
- Order: Coleoptera
- Suborder: Polyphaga
- Infraorder: Cucujiformia
- Family: Chrysomelidae
- Genus: Anisostena
- Species: A. ariadne

Binomial name
- Anisostena ariadne (Newman, 1841)

Synonyms
- Hispa ariadne Newman, 1841

= Anisostena ariadne =

Species of beetle

Anisostena ariadne is a species of leaf beetle in the family Chrysomelidae. It is found in North America, where it has been recorded from Alabama, Arkansas, Delaware, the District of Columbia, Florida, Georgia, Kentucky, Louisiana, Maryland, Mississippi, Missouri, New Jersey, North Carolina, Oklahoma, South Carolina, Tennessee, Texas, Virginia and West Virginia.

== Description ==
Adults reach a length of about 4.6-5.3 mm. The elytron is black with a purple hue.

== Biology ==
This species has been found feeding on Panicum virgatum.
