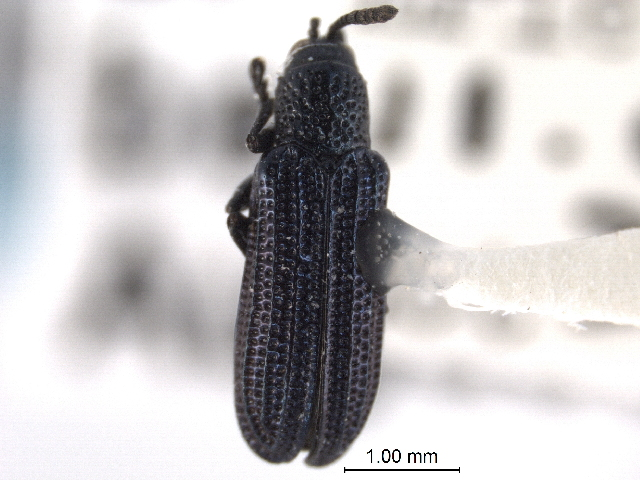

Scientific classification
- Kingdom: Animalia
- Phylum: Arthropoda
- Class: Insecta
- Order: Coleoptera
- Suborder: Polyphaga
- Infraorder: Cucujiformia
- Family: Chrysomelidae
- Genus: Anisostena
- Species: A. californica

Binomial name
- Anisostena californica Van Dyke, 1925

= Anisostena californica =

Species of beetle

Anisostena californica is a species of leaf beetle in the family Chrysomelidae. It is found in North America, where it has been recorded from British Columbia, California, Colorado, Idaho, Montana, Oregon, South Dakota and Washington.

== Biology ==
Adults have been collected on reedy grass and grass, but the foodplant is not certain.
