= Ching bo leung =

Chinese sweet cold soup

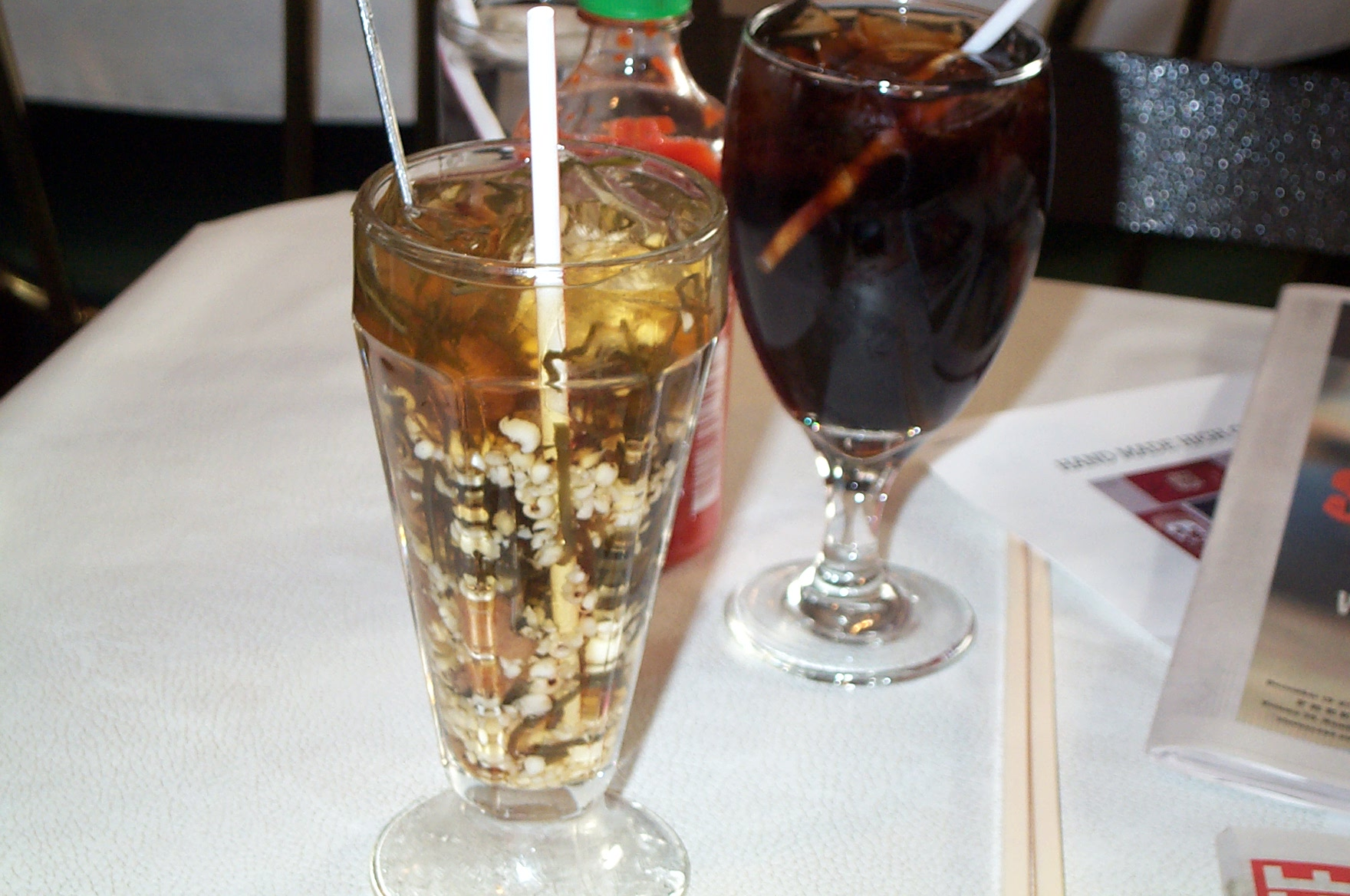
- Sâm bổ lượng
- Alternative names: Ching po leung, qing bu liang
- Type: Soup
- Course: Lunch, dinner
- Place of origin: China
- Region or state: East Asia and Southeast Asia
- Serving temperature: Cold
- Main ingredients: Yi mai grains, dried longans, red jujubes, lotus seeds, seaweed, sugar, water, ice

Ching bo leung

Chinese name
- Traditional Chinese: 清補涼
- Simplified Chinese: 清补凉
Transcriptions
Standard Mandarin
- Hanyu Pinyin: qīng bǔ liáng
Yue: Cantonese
- Jyutping: cing1 bou2 loeng2 (NOT loeng4)

Vietnamese name
- Vietnamese: sâm bổ lượng

Ching bo leung (Chinese: 清补凉; also spelt ching po leung or qing bu liang; lit. 'refreshing, nourishing, cool') is a sweet, cold dessert soup of Chinese origin, which is commonly served in Cantonese cuisine, Hainanese cuisine and Guangxi cuisine. It is a popular dessert in Malaysia and Singapore. It is a type of tong sui. In Singapore it is known as 清汤 ("Cheng Tng" in Hokkien). It is known as sâm bổ lượng or chè sâm bổ lượng (chè meaning "sweet soup") in Vietnam.

Although the exact recipe may vary, the drink generally contains grains of yi mai (Chinese pearl barley), dried longans, red jujubes, lotus seeds, and thinly sliced seaweed, with water, sugar, and crushed ice. In place of the yi mai, pearl barley may sometimes be used, and thinly sliced strips of ginger and/or ginseng root, wolfberries, or ginkgo nuts may also appear as ingredients.

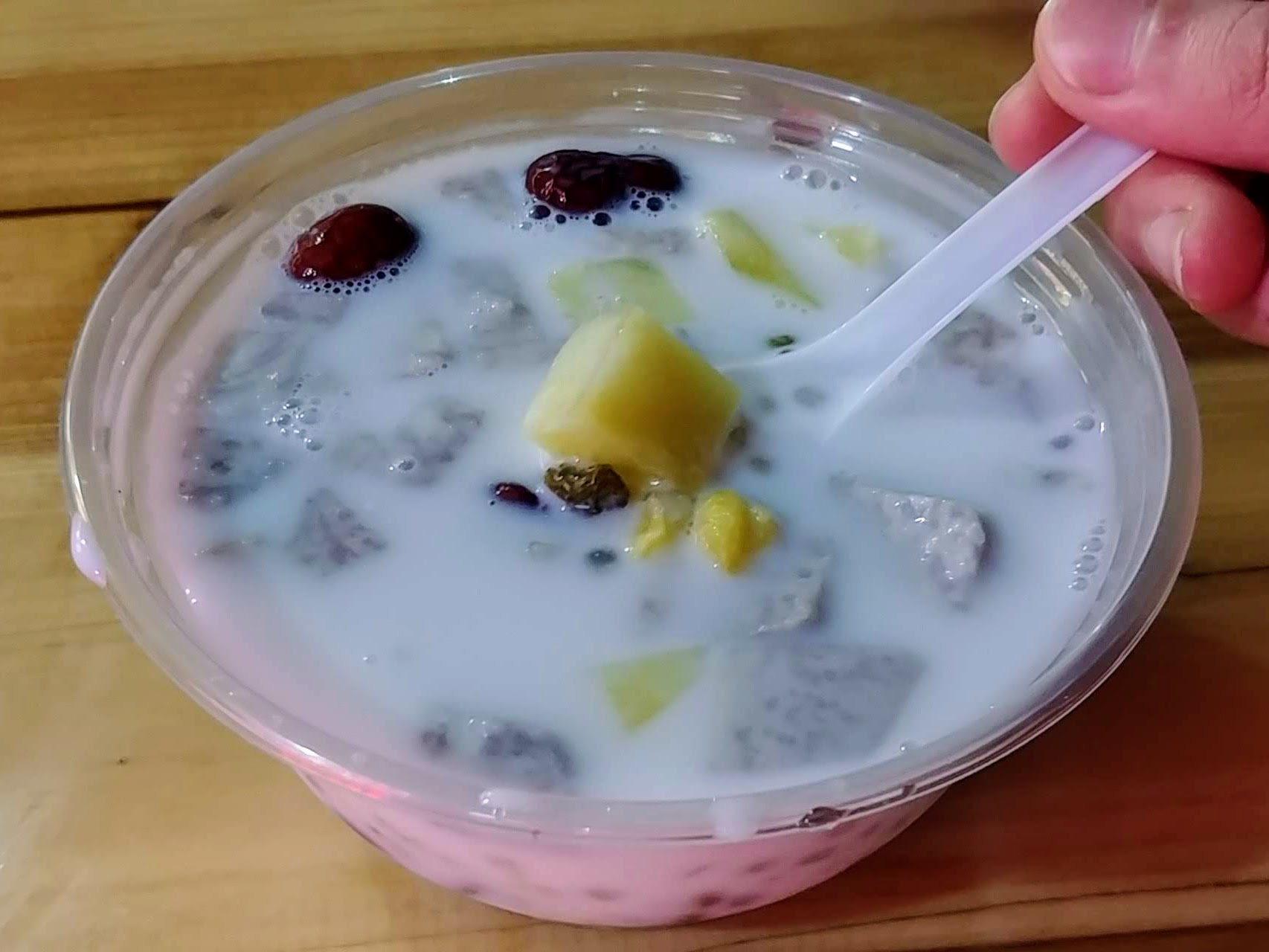
清補涼 Qingbuliang

The Chinese form of the drink, ching bo leung, is the most popular in the Cantonese cuisine of Guangdong, Hong Kong, Macau. It is also popular as a dessert at food & hawker centres in Malaysia and Singapore. It is sometimes known as luk mei soup (六味汤, lit. 'six flavour soup').

The Vietnamese version, sâm bổ lượng, is most readily available in Cholon, the Chinatown of Ho Chi Minh City, and is generally served in a tall glass. Although it is sometimes described as a drink, the term "soup" is more appropriate, as a spoon is generally necessary to consume the solid ingredients.

In Hainan, due to the relative abundance of local coconuts, a frequent unique ingredient used to make qing bu liang would be cold coconut milk. In this tropical province, a Hainanese qing bu liang could consist of assorted ingredients that can include mango, watermelon, coconut meat or shredded dried coconut, cooked mung beans, red kidney beans, taro, quail eggs, bean jelly, red jujubes and then combined with brown sugar syrup, ice, coconut water or coconut milk, and sometimes a few scoops of ice cream. The dish is believed to help "dispel heat" from the body and is popular during the typical hot Hainan weather where there are a prolific number of qing bu liang shops and dessert stands in the tropical island province with varying ingredients and flavours.

== See also ==
- Tong sui
