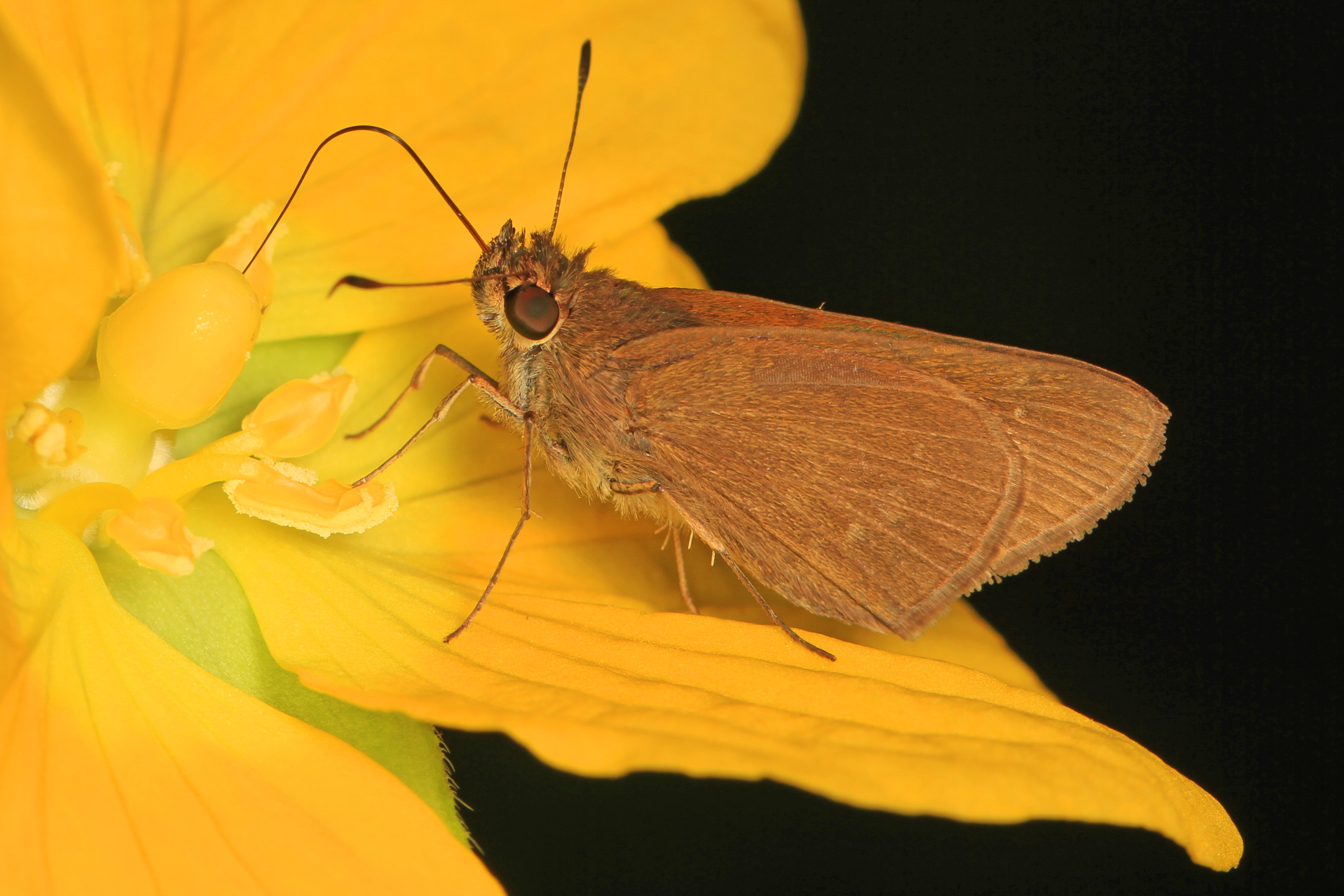

Scientific classification
- Kingdom: Animalia
- Phylum: Arthropoda
- Class: Insecta
- Order: Lepidoptera
- Family: Hesperiidae
- Genus: Cymaenes
- Species: C. tripunctus

Binomial name
- Cymaenes tripunctus (Herrich-Schäffer, 1865)

Synonyms
- Cobalus tripunctus Herrich-Schäffer, 1865

= Cymaenes tripunctus =

Species of butterfly

Cymaenes tripunctus, known generally as the three-spotted skipper or dingy dotted skipper, is a species of grass skipper in the butterfly family Hesperiidae. It is found in the Caribbean Sea, Central America, Florida, and South America.

== Description ==
The wings of the butterfly are dull dark brown. The upperside of the forewing has 3 tiny transparent white spots on the leading edge near the tip and 2 to 3 spots at the end of the cell. The underside of the hindwing is yellow-brown with faint pale spots near the center. The wing span ranges from 1 1/8 to 1 3/8 inches, or 2.9 to 3.5 centimeters long.

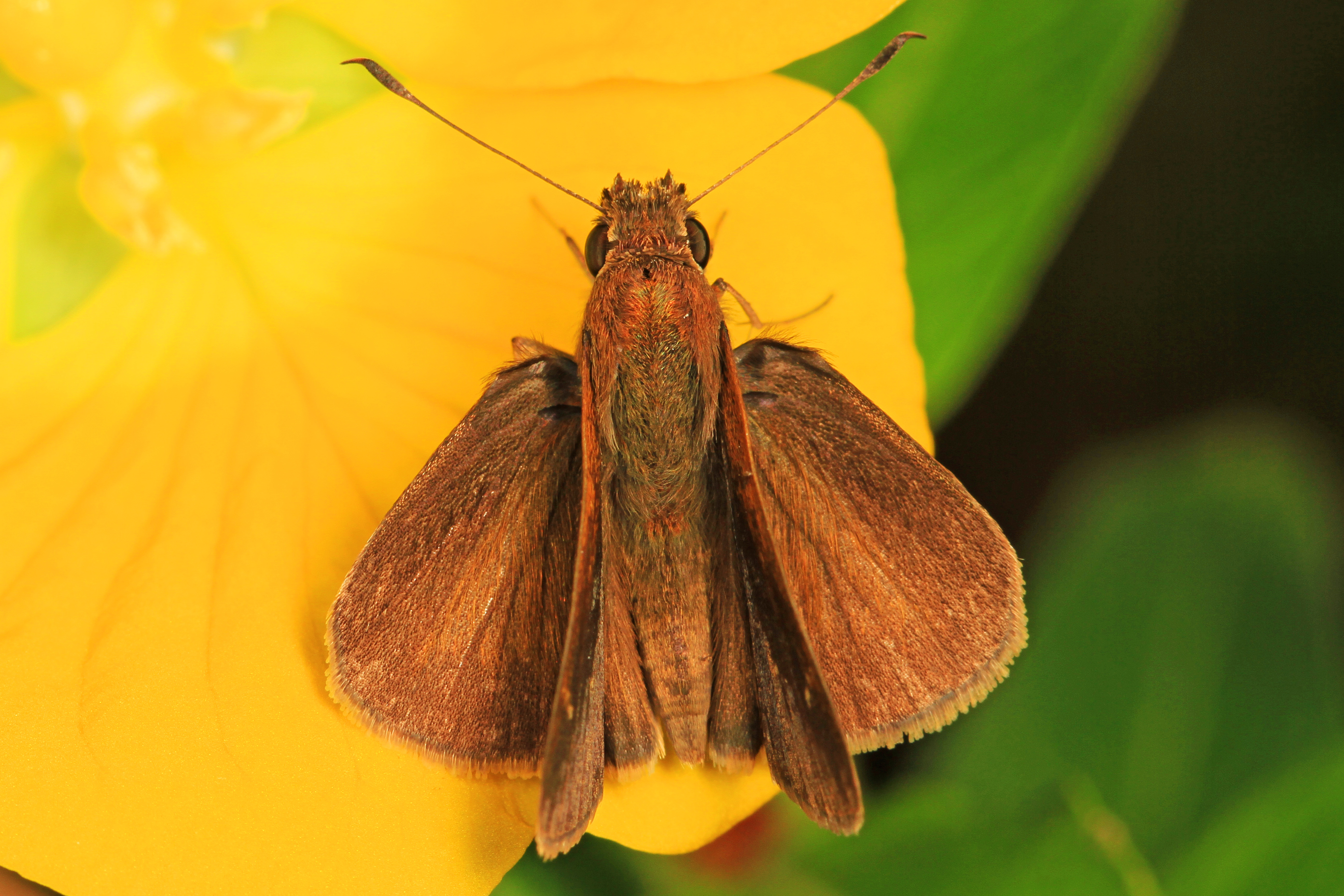
Three-spotted skipper, Cymaenes tripunctus

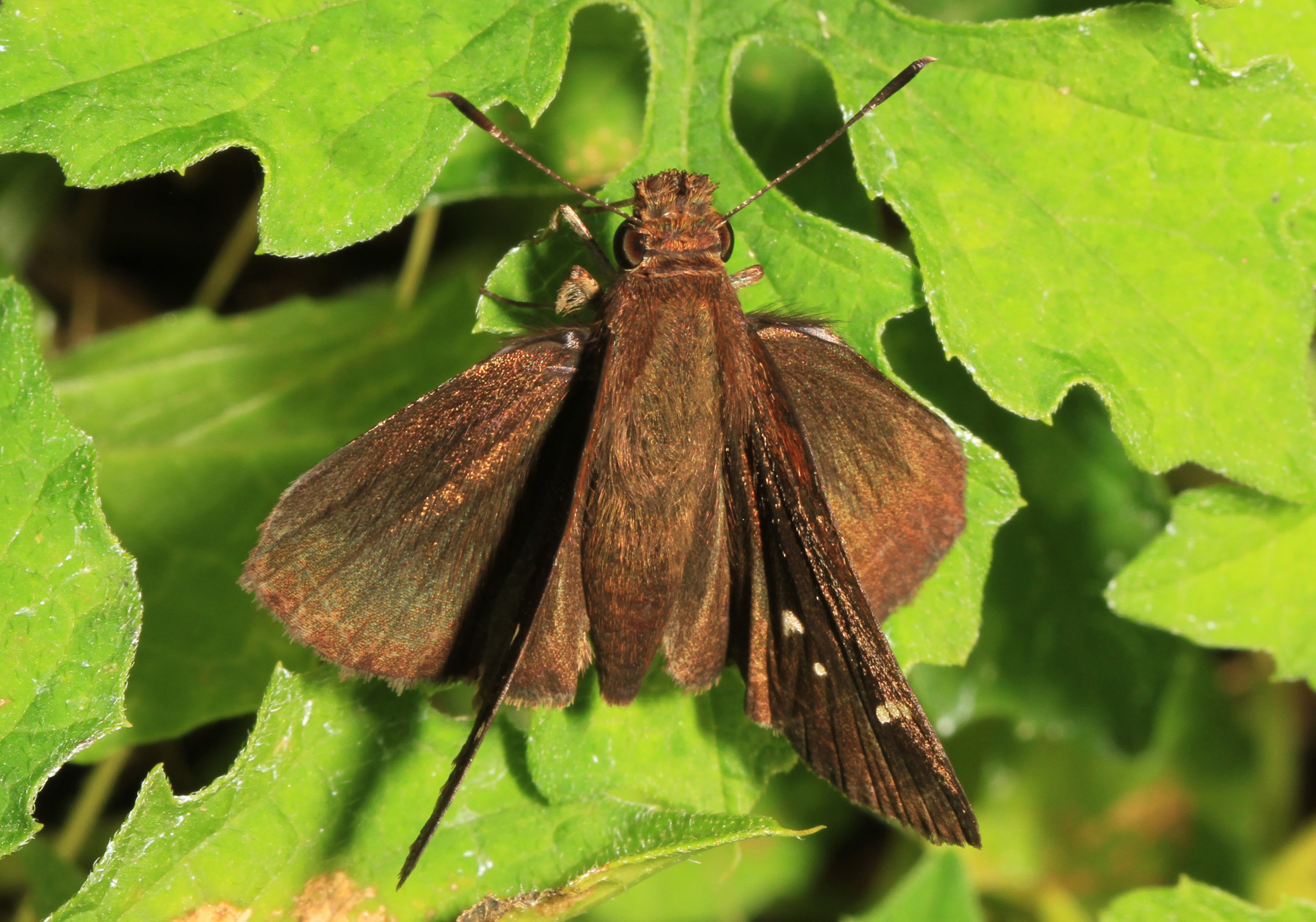
Three-spotted skipper, Cymaenes tripunctus

== Subspecies ==
These two subspecies belong to the species Cymaenes tripunctus:

- Cymaenes tripunctus theogenis Capronnier, 1874
- Cymaenes tripunctus tripunctus (Herrich-Schäffer, 1865)
