= Kuroimine Site =

- 黒井峯遺跡 (Japanese)
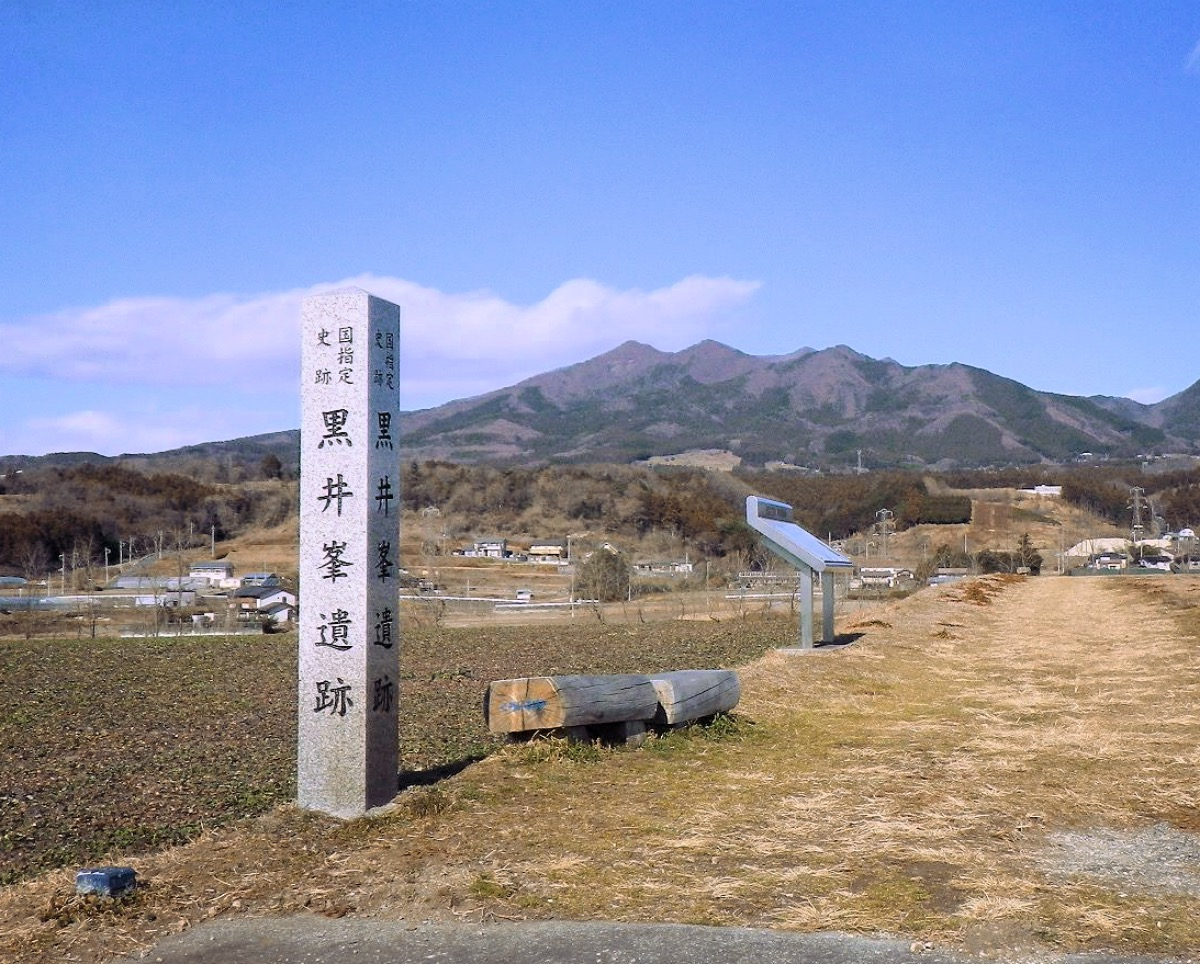
- Kuroimine Site

- Kuroimine Site Kuroimine Site (Japan)
- 36°31′46.3″N 139°00′08.0″E
- Type: settlement
- Periods: Kofun period
- Location: Shibukawa, Gunma, Japan
- Region: Kantō region

Site notes
- Discovered: 1982
- Public access: Yes (no public facilities)

Kuroimine Site (黒井峯遺跡, Kuroimine iseki) is an archaeological site containing the ruins of a Kofun period settlement (dating from around the mid 500 AD) located in what is now the Komochi neighborhood of the city of Shibukawa, Gunma Prefecture in the northern Kantō region of Japan. The site was designated a National Historic Site of Japan in 1993.

== Overview ==
The site is located on a river terrace on the north bank of the Agatsuma River, in the central part of Gunma. It was buried almost instantly by a large amount of pumice and volcanic ash from an eruption of Mount Haruna, which is located ten kilometers to the southwest. The eruption covered the entire area from 50-cm to two meters in thickness. The ruins were discovered in 1982. Ground-penetrating radar surveys followed by trench excavation found the remains of 110 pit dwellings and tumuli under the pumice layer. From 1985, as a result of excavation survey of about 40,000 m2, the extent of the late Kofun period settlement, consisting of pit dwellings, flat dwellings, raised-floor structures, garden traces, roads, fence rows, ritual sites, etc. was revealed to be in a very good condition. The site shed considerable light on society during this period of Japan's prehistory. It appears that each residence was a compound containing the pit-dwelling residence, ground-level workshops and livestock sheds and raised-floor granaries, surrounded by a fence. Each compound thus consisted of seven to ten buildings, and it appear that several families lived in each compound. The settlement consisted of eight to ten of such compounds. Daily life combined paddy field agriculture with grazing of cattle and horses.

The site is located 30 minutes by car from Shibukawa Station on the JR East Jōetsu Line. The ruins were backfilled after excavation and are now an empty field.

== See also ==
- List of Historic Sites of Japan (Gunma)
