= Chaetanaphothrips orchidii =

Scientific classification
- Kingdom: Animalia
- Phylum: Arthropoda
- Class: Insecta
- Order: Thysanoptera
- Family: Thripidae
- Genus: Chaetanaphothrips
- Species: C. orchidii

Binomial name
- Chaetanaphothrips orchidii (Moulton, 1907)

Synonyms
- Euthrips orchidii

Species of thrips

Chaetanaphothrips orchidii is a species of thrips. It is a pest of finger millet and sorghum in India.
